= List of Polish artists =

The following is a list of some important Polish artists and groups of artists.

== A ==
- Magdalena Abakanowicz (1930–2017), sculptor
- Julia Acker (1898–1942), painter
- Jankel Adler (1895–1949), painter
- Hiacynt Alchimowicz (1841–1897), painter
- Tadeusz Ajdukiewicz (1852–1916), painter
- Zygmunt Ajdukiewicz (1861–1917), painter
- Kazimierz Alchimowicz (1840–1916), painter
- Paweł Althamer (born 1967), sculptor, video art
- Maess Anand (born 1982), drawing artist
- Zygmunt Andrychiewicz (186100–1943), painter
- Włodzimierz Antkowiak (born 1946), painter, poet
- Zofia Atteslander (1874–1928), painter
- Teodor Axentowicz (1859–1938), painter

== B ==
- Marcello Bacciarelli (1731–1818), painter
- Stanisław Baj (born 1953), painter
- Ladislaus Bakalowicz (1831–1904), painter
- Stefan Bakałowicz (1857–1947), painter
- Mirosław Bałka (born 1958), sculptor
- Andrzej Marian Bartczak (born 1945), painter, illustrator
- Anna Bilińska (1857–1893),
- Zdzisław Beksiński (1929–2005), painter
- Józef Bełch (1909–1993), painter
- Władysław T. Benda (1873–1948), painter, illustrator, designer
- Ludomir Benedyktowicz (1844–1926), painter
- Stanisław Bergman (1862–1930), painter
- Henryk Berlewi (1894–1967), painter and graphic designer
- Jan Betley (1908–1980), painter
- Dora Bianka (c. 1895–1979), painter, illustrator
- Paweł Bielec (1902–2002), photographer
- Antoni Blank (1785–1844), painter
- Krzysztof Boguszewski (died 1635), painter
- Stanisław Bohusz-Siestrzeńcewicz (1869–1927), painter
- Jan Bohuszewicz (1878–1935), painter
- Wacław Borowski (1885–1954), painter
- Olga Boznańska (1865–1940), painter
- Józef Brandt (1841–1915), painter
- Chrystian Breslauer (180200–1882), painter
- Tadeusz Breyer (1874–1952), sculptor and medallist
- Antoni Brodowski (1784–1832), painter
- Józef Brodowski the Elder (c. 1775/81–1853), painter
- Józef Brodowski the Younger (1828–1900), painter
- Tadeusz Brodowski (1821–1848), painter
- Urszula Broll (1930–2020), painter
- Tadeusz Brzozowski (1918–1987), painter
- Feliks Brzozowski (1836–1892), painter
- Joshua Budziszewski Benor (1950–2006), painter
- Alicja Buławka-Fankidejska (born 1983), ceramist
- Franciszek Bunsch (1926–2025), painter, graphics artist

== C ==
- Maksymilian Cercha (1818–1907), painter, draftsman
- Ignacy Julian Cejzyk (1779–1858), painter, photographer, and forger
- Józef Charyton (1909–1975), painter
- Caziel (1906–1988), painter
- Józef Cempla (1918–2004), painter
- Józef Chełmoński (1849–1905), painter
- Stanisław Chlebowski (1835–1884), painter
- Daniel Chodowiecki (1726–1801), painter
- Bronisław Chromy (1925–2017), medallist, painter, and draughtsman
- Leon Chwistek (1884–1944), painter
- Halina Chrostowska (1929–1990), printmaker, educator, activist
- Jan Ciągliński (1858–1913), painter
- Henryk Cieszkowski (1835–1895), painter
- Boleslaw Cybis (1895–1957), painter, sculptor, and muralist
- Florian Cynk (1835–1912), painter, illustrator
- Władysław Czachorski (1850–1911), painter
- Józef Czajkowski (1872–1947), painter, architect, furniture designer, tapestries
- Marian Czapla (1946–2016), painter, graphic designer
- Józef Czapski (1896–1993), painter
- Zbigniew Czech (1909–1973), painter
- Szymon Czechowicz (1689–1775), painter
- Tytus Czyżewski (1880–1945), painter

== Ć ==
- Zefiryn Ćwikliński (1871–1930), painter

== D ==
- Krystyna Dąbrowska (1906–1944), sculptor and painter
- Andrzej Dłużniewski (1939–2012), painter
- Tadeusz Dominik (1928–2014), painter
- Kasia Domanska (1880–1972), painter
- Odo Dobrowolski (1883–1917), painter
- Tadeusz Dowgird (1852–1919), painter
- Karl Duldig (1902–1986), Austrian-Australian sculptor, born in what is now Poland
- Xawery Dunikowski (1875–1964), sculptor and painter
- Franciszek Duszeńko (1925–2008), sculptor

== E ==
- Erwin Elster (1887–1977), painter

== F ==
- Julian Fałat (1853–1929), painter
- Erazm Fabijański (1826–1892), painter
- Stanisław Fabijański (1865–1947), painter
- Wojciech Fangor (1922–2015), painter
- Samuel Finkelstein (1895–1942), painter
- Tadeusz Fuss-Kaden (1914–1985), painter

== G ==
- Ewa Gargulinska (born 1941), painter
- Maria Gażycz (1860–1935), painter
- Wojciech Gerson (1831–1901), painter
- Adam Gerżabek (1898–1965), painter
- Stefan Gierowski (1925–2022), painter
- Aleksander Gierymski (1850–1901), painter
- Maksymilian Gierymski (1846–1874), painter
- Krzysztof Gliszczyński (born 1962), painter
- Adrian Głębocki (1833–1905), painter
- Jan Nepomucen Głowacki (1802–1847), painter
- Chaim Goldberg (1917–2004), painter, sculptor, engraver
- Wanda Gołkowska (1925–2013), painter
- Tadeusz Gorecki (1825–1866), painter
- Wiktoria Goryńska (1902–1945), painter, graphic artist, book illustrator.
- Józef Gosławski (1908–1963), sculptor and medallist
- Michał Gorstkin-Wywiórski (1861–1926), painter
- Henryk Gotlib (1890–1966), painter
- Maurycy Gottlieb (1865–1932), painter
- Stanisław Grocholski (1880–1945), painter
- Artur Grottger (1833–1879), painter
- Aleksander Gryglewski (1880–1945), painter
- Gustaw Gwozdecki (1880–1935), painter, sculptor, printmaker

== H ==
- Wladyslaw Hasior (1928–1999), sculptor
- Karol Hiller (1891–1939), painter
- George Him (1900–1982), designer and artist
- Joanna Hoffmann-Dietrich (born 1968), artist and academic
- Horak, Eugeniusz (1914–1972), painter and woodblock printmaker

== I ==
- Napoleon Iłłakowicz (1811–1857), painter
- Marian Iwańciów (1906–1971), painter

== J ==
- Stanisław Jackowski (1887–1951), sculptor
- Janusz Janowski (born 1965), painter
- Jerzy Jarnuszkiewicz (1919–2005), sculptor
- Krzysztof Jung (1951–1998), painter and installation artist
- Ewa Juszkiewicz (born 1984), painter
- Izydor Jabłoński (1863–1932), painter
- Maria Jarema (1908–1958), painter, sculptor
- Zdzisław Jasiński (1880–1945), painter
- Renata Jaworska (born 1979), visual artist
- Danuta Joppek (born 1955), painter

== K ==
- Stanisław Kamocki (1875–1944), painter
- Rajmund Kanelba (1897–1960), painter
- Jan Kaja (1957), painter
- Tadeusz Kantor (1915–1990), painter, theatre director
- Stanisława de Karłowska (1876–1952), painter
- Alfons Karpiński (1875–1961), painter
- Wincenty Kasprzycki (1802–1949), painter
- Apoloniusz Kędzierski (1861–1939), painter, illustrator
- Mojżesz Kisling (1891–1953), painter
- Raphaël Kleweta, (1949–2016), artist
- Stefan Knapp (1921–1996), painter, sculptor
- Marcin Kober (ca. 1550 – before 1598), painter
- Katarzyna Kobro (1898–1951), sculptor
- Roman Kochanowski (1857–1846), painter,
- Helga Kohl (born 1943), photographer
- Aleksander Kokular (1793–1954), painter, sculptor
- Urszula Kolaczkowska (1911–2009), textile artist
- Ludwik Konarzewski (1918–1989), painter
- Ludwik Konarzewski (junior) (1880–1945), painter
- Bogdan Korczowski (born 1954), painter
- Juliusz Kossak (1824–1899), painter
- Wojciech Kossak (1856–1942), painter
- Jerzy Kossak (1886–1955), painter
- Mieczysław Kościelniak (1912–1993), painter, graphic designer
- Franciszek Kostrzewski (1826–1911), painter
- Wilhelm Kotarbiński (1848–1921), painter
- Apolinary Kotowicz (1859–1917), painter
- Aleksander Kotsis (1836–1915), painter
- Alfred Kowalski (1849–1945), painter
- Andrzej Kowalski (1930–2004), painter
- Felicjan Kowarski (1890–1948), painter
- Nikifor Krynicki (1895–1968), painter
- Hilary Krzysztofiak (1926–1979), painter, graphic artist
- Konrad Krzyżanowski (1872–1922), painter
- Wlodzimierz Ksiazek (1951–2011), painter
- Alexander Kucharsky (1741–1819), painter
- Paweł Kuczyński (born 1976), painter, illustrator
- Teofil Kwiatkowski (1809–1891), painter
- Katarzyna Kozyra (born 1963), sculptor
- Stanisław Kubicki (1889–1943), painter, printmaker

== L ==
- Małgorzata Turewicz Lafranchi (born 1961), contemporary artist
- Tamara de Lempicka (1898–1980), painter
- Roman Lipski, (born 1969) contemporary artist
- Natalia LL (1937–2022), painter, photographer

== Ł ==
- Władysław Łuszczkiewicz (1828–1900), painter

== M ==
- Tadeusz Makowski (1882–1932), painter
- Jerzy Makarewicz (1907–1944), painter
- Jacek Malczewski (1854–1929), painter
- Rafał Malczewski (1892–1965), painter, cartoonist
- Lech Majewski (born 1947), painter
- Goshka Macuga (born 1967), sculptor, photographer
- Władysław Malecki (1836–1900), painter
- Kazimir Malevich (1879–1935), painter
- Louis Marcoussis (1878–1941), painter
- Adam Marczyński (1908–1985), painter
- Stanisław Masłowski (1853–1926), painter
- Jan Matejko (1838–1893), painter
- Agata Materowicz (born 1962), painter
- Józef Mehoffer (1869–1946), painter
- Piotr Michałowski (1800–1855), painter
- Jacek Mierzejewski (1883–1925), painter
- Jerzy Mierzejewski (1917–2012), painter
- Augustyn Mirys (1700–1790), painter
- Ludwik Misky (1884–1938), painter
- Igor Mitoraj (1944–2014), sculptor
- Eugeniusz Molski (born 1942), painter, sculptor

== N ==
- Eligiusz Niewiadomski (1869–1923), painter
- Jan Piotr Norblin (1745–1830), painter
- Zbigniew Nowosadzki (born 1957), painter
- Jerzy Nowosielski (1923–2011), painter

== O ==
- Roman Opałka (1931–2011), painter
- Seweryn Obst (1847–1917), painter
- Rafał Olbiński (born 1943), painter
- Aleksander Orłowski (1777–1832), painter
- Maria Orłowska (1902–1993), painter

== P ==
- Józef Pankiewicz (1866–1940), painter
- Ewa Pachucka (1936–2020), sculptor
- Józef Peszka (1793–1812), painter
- Jan Pieńkowski (1936–2022), painter, illustrator
- Jacek Papla (born 1951), graphic artist and painter
- Urszula Plewka-Schmidt (1939–2008), tapestry artist
- Władysław Pochwalski (1860–1924), painter
- Władysław Podkowiński (1866–1895), painter
- Peter Potworowski (1898–1962), painter
- Tadeusz Pruszkówski (1888–1942), painter
- Witold Pruszkówski (1846–1896), painter
- Stanislaw Przespolewski (1910–1989), painter, sculptor

== R ==
- Józef Rapacki (1871–1929), painter
- Henryk Rodakowski (1823–1894), painter
- Zofia Romer (1885–1972), painter
- Barbara Rosiak (born 1955), painter and graphic artist
- Moshe Rynecki (1881–1943), painter
- Kanuty Rusiecki (1800–1860), painter
- Ferdynand Ruszczyc (1870–1936), painter

== S ==
- Stanisław Samostrzelnik (c. 1490–1541), painter
- Wojciech Sadley (1932), painter, draftsman
- Wilhelm Sasnal (born 1972), painter
- Jan Sawka (1946–2012), painter, sculptor, printmaker, stage and set design
- Bruno Schulz (1892–1942), painter
- Maria Seyda (1893–1989), portrait painter
- Henryk Siemiradzki (1843–1902), painter
- Józef Simmler (1823–1868), painter
- Wojciech Siudmak (born 1942), painter
- Władysław Skoczylas (1883–1934), painter, sculptor
- Władysław Ślewiński (1856–1918), painter
- Franciszek Smuglewicz (1745–1807), painter
- Anna Sobol-Wejman (born 1946), printmaker
- Aleksander A Sochaczewski (1843–1923), painter
- Jacek Soliński (born 1957), painter
- Kajetan Sosnowski (1913–1987), painter
- Kazimierz Stabrowski (1869–1925), painter
- Jan Stanisławski (1860–1907), painter
- Jan Byk Franciszek Starowieyski (1930–2009), painter
- Henryk Stażewski (1894–1988), painter
- Ludwik Stasiak (1858–1924), painter
- Abraham Straski (1903–1987), painter
- Władysław Strzemiński (1893–1952), painter
- Jan Styka (1858–1925), painter
- January Suchodolski (1797–1875), painter
- Józef Szajna (1922–2008), sculptor, scenography designer, theatre director
- Alina Szapocznikow (1926–1973), sculptor
- Mieczysław Szczuka (1898–1927), painter
- Zofia Szeptycka (1837–1904), painter, poet
- Józef Szermentowski (1833–1876), painter
- Stanisław Szukalski (1893–1987), painter and sculptor
- Zofia Szymanowska-Lenartowicz (1825–1870), painter, poet
- Arthur Szyk (1894–1951), painter of illuminated miniatures, book illustrator

== T ==
- Włodzimierz Tetmajer (1861–1923), painter
- Franciszek Tepa (1829–1889), painter
- Teodor Talowski (1857–1910), painter, architect
- Henryk Tomaszewski (1914–2005), illustrator, poster artist
- Feliks Topolski (1907–1989), painter, draughtsman
- Franciszka Themerson (1907–1988), painter

== U ==
- Piotr Uklański (born 1968), painter, installation artist
- Marian Ulc (born 1947), sculptor

== W ==
- Zygmunt Waliszewski (1897–1936), painter
- Zygmunt Vogel (1764–1826), illustrator, painter
- Walenty Wańkowicz (1799–1842), painter
- Wojciech Weiss (1875–1950), painter
- Aleksander Werner (1920–2011), painter, sculptor
- Jan de Weryha-Wysoczański (born 1950), sculptor
- Katerina Wilczynski (1894–1978), painter and illustrator
- Stanisław Witkiewicz (1851–1915)
- Stanisław Ignacy Witkiewicz a.k.a. "Witkacy" (1885–1939)
- Karol D. Witkowski (1860–1910), painter
- Krzysztof Wodiczko (born 1943), installation artist
- Witold Wojtkiewicz (1879–1909), painter
- Andrzej Wróblewski (1927–1957), painter
- Leon Wyczółkowski (1852–1936), painter
- Stanisław Wyspiański (1869–1907), painter

== Y ==
- Jacek Yerka (born 1952), painter

== Z ==
- Marcin Zaleski (1796–1877), painter

== Ż ==
- Eugeniusz Żak (1884–1926), painter
- Franciszek Żmurko (1859–1910), painter
- Marek Żuławski (1908–1985), painter

== See also ==
- List of Poles
- List of Polish painters
- List of Polish contemporary artists
