= Władysław Malecki =

Polish landscape painter (1836–1900)

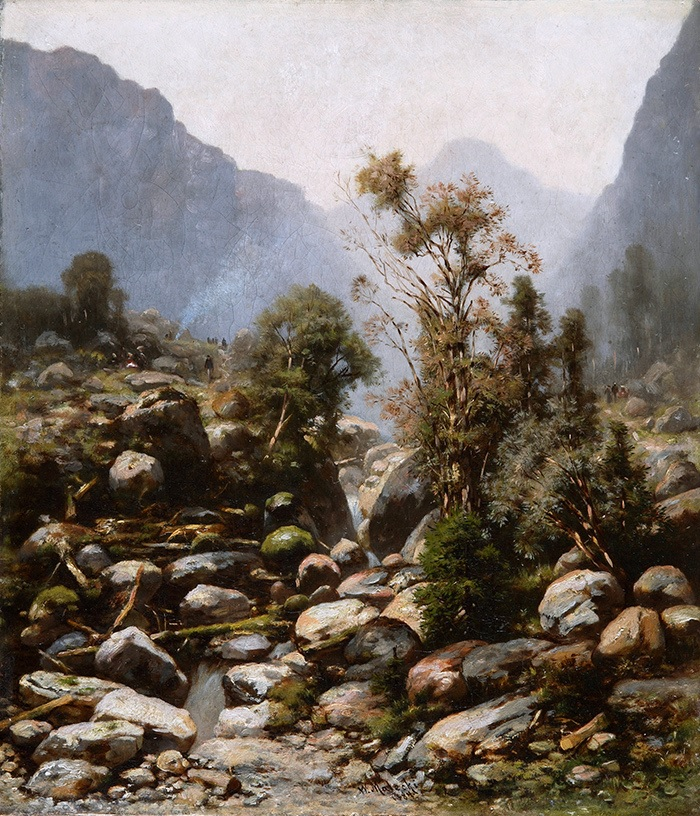
Mountain Landscape

Władysław Aleksander Malecki (3 January 1836, Masłów - 5 March 1900, Szydłowiec) was a Polish landscape painter in the Realistic style.

== Biography ==
He was born to an impoverished noble family. His father worked as a government clerk, calculating the income from farms and industrial plants. After the birth of their second child, the family moved to Suchedniów, where his father became the cashier for a mining company.

Initially, he worked as a stage decorator for Antonio Sacchetti, an Italian set designer who had come to Poland in 1829. Then, from 1852 to 1856, he attended the School of Fine Arts in Warsaw, where he studied with Chrystian Breslauer.

A scholarship enabled him to study abroad; first at the University of Applied Arts in Vienna, then at the Academy of Fine Arts, Munich, where he studied with Eduard Schleich. It was then that he decided to devote himself to landscapes. After graduating in 1879 he travelled extensively; working throughout Bavaria, Tyrolia and the Alps.

His paintings received little recognition in Poland, although he had won several medals at exhibitions in London and Vienna during the 1870s. In 1880, he returned to Poland and, unable to find steady employment as a decorative painter, turned to teaching art at a private school in Koło.

He still travelled frequently and painted en plein aire in the Świętokrzyskie Mountains. He even went back to Munich for a short time. In the early 1890s, he returned to Poland and attempted to take up teaching again, but his financial situation continued to worsen.

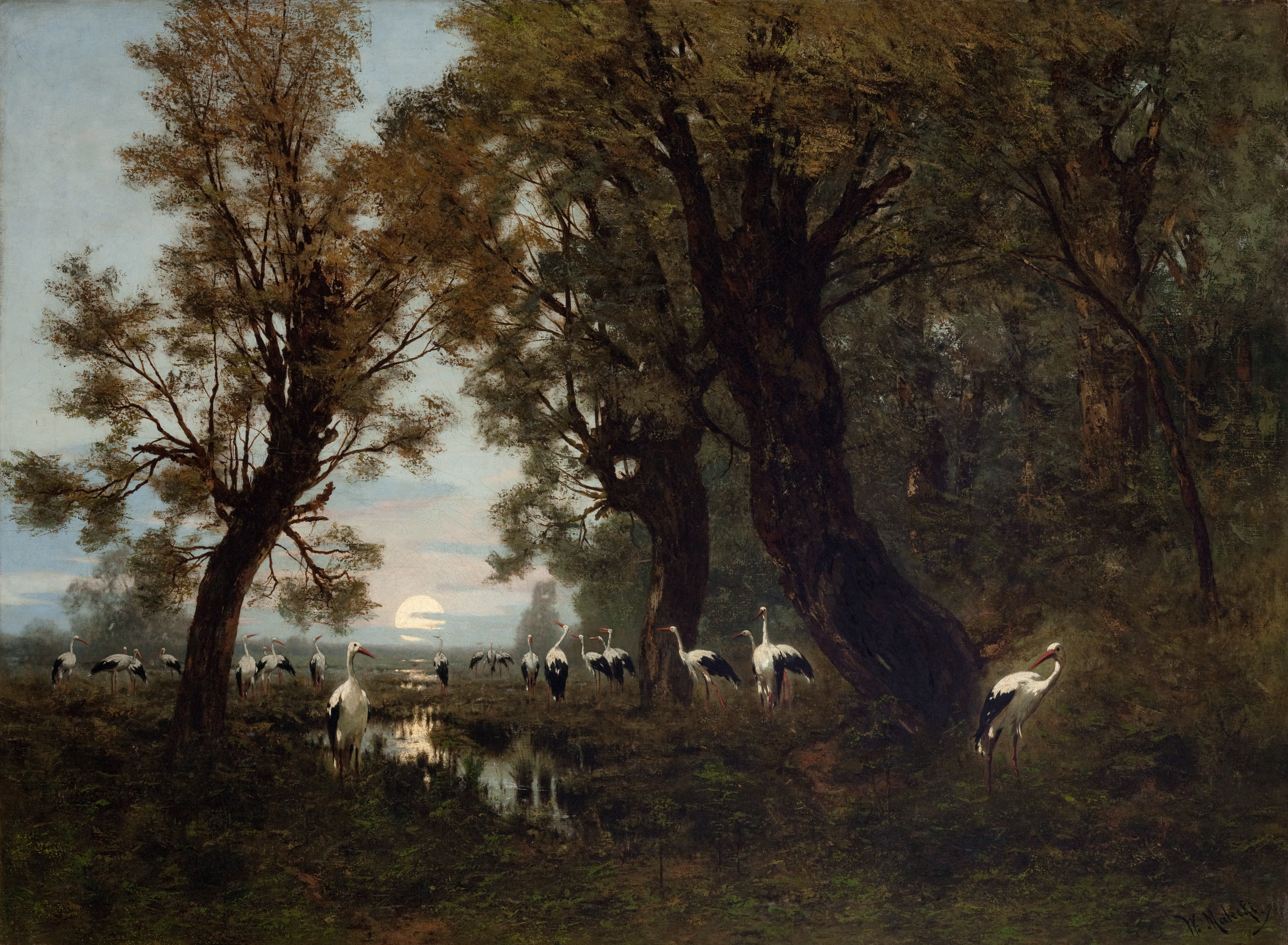
Flock of Storks, 1879

Later, he wandered through several small cities without any means of subsistence until 1898, when the Mayor of Szydłowiec, who liked his work, allowed him to live and have his studio in the Town Hall bell tower. He died there two years later, apparently from hunger and exhaustion.
