= Bielec =

Bielec is a surname. Notable people with the surname include:

- Frank Bielec (1947–2020), American interior designer, artist, and television personality
- Paweł Bielec (1902–2002), Polish photographer and painter
