= Feliks Brzozowski =

Polish painter and illustrator

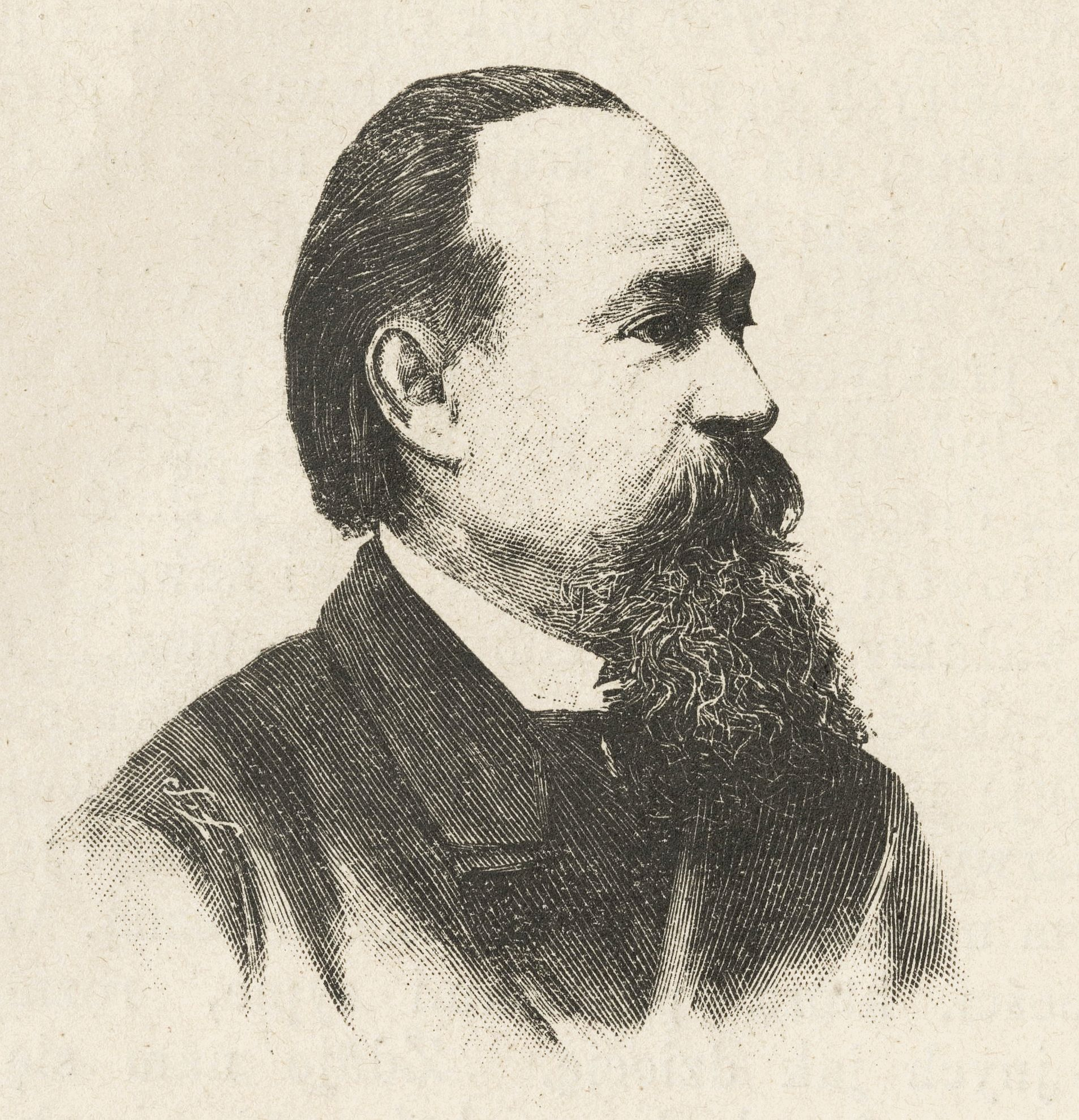
- Born: Feliks Brzozowski; 1836; Warsaw, Poland
- Died: 1892 (aged 55–56); Warsaw, Poland
- Education: Academy of Fine Arts in Warsaw
- Known for: Painting
- Movement: Naturalism

Feliks Brzozowski (1836– 1892) was a Polish painter and illustrator.

He was born in Warsaw. From 1852 to 1859, he studied at the Academy of Fine Arts in Warsaw under the guidance of Chrystian Breslauer. Brzozowski mainly painted landscape art, predominantly in the forest motif. During his travels around Poland, his landscape artwork centred around the localities of Ojców and the Tatra Mountains, as well as castles. Brzozowski's travels abroad (to Crimea and the Alps) are not represented in his artwork. The artwork that the artist did create, he sent to the Society of Friends of Fine Arts in Kraków, while in Warsaw, many of his works featured in Krywult's Saloon and since its founding, the Society of the Encouragement of Fine Arts. Since 1865, he published his work in Warsaw's news journals (Tygodnik Illustrowany, Biesiada Literacka and Kłosy). Brzozowski died in 1892 in Warsaw.

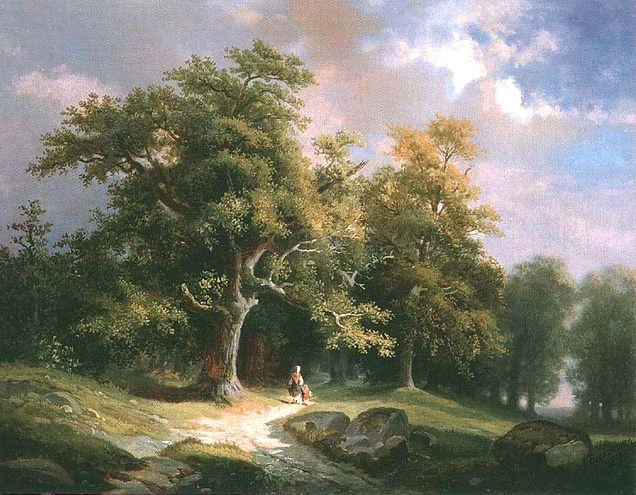
Road to the forest
(1871)

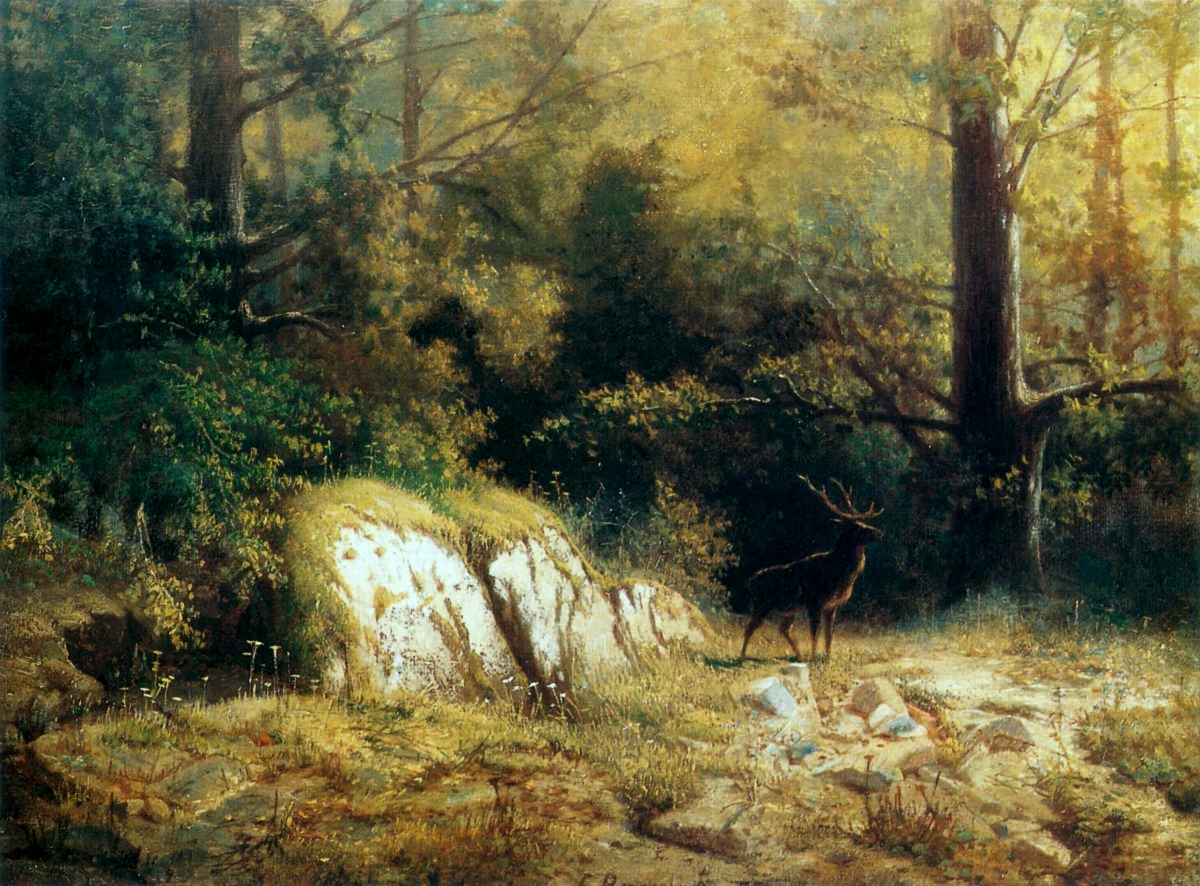
Forest landscape with a deer
(1875)

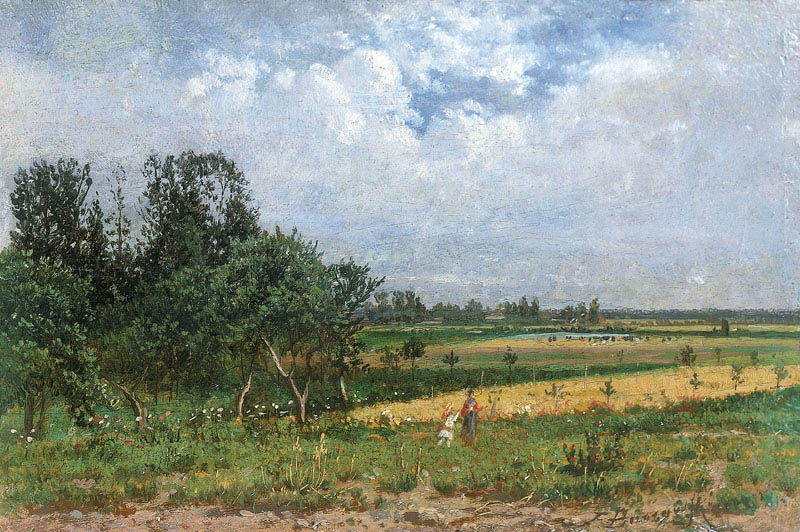
Summer landscape in the vicinity of Gołaszew
(1889)
