= Adrian Głębocki =

Polish painter, lithographer and art teacher

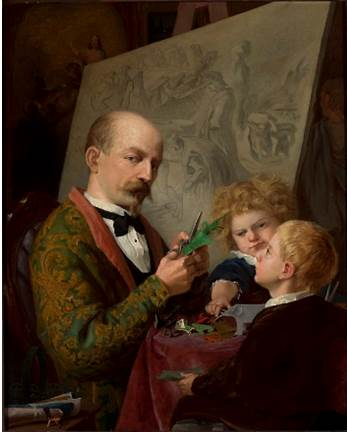
Self-portrait with His Children (c. 1870)

Adrian Mikołaj Głębocki (8 September 1833, in Panki – 15 May 1905, in Warsaw) was a Polish painter, lithographer and art teacher.

== Biography ==
After completing secondary school in 1850, he studied at the School of Fine Arts in Warsaw until 1857, where his primary instructor was Rafał Hadziewicz. This was followed by studies in Paris, Vienna and Munich. After completing his studies, he worked briefly in Warsaw as a scenery painter for the set designer, Antonio Sacchetti. From 1863, he lived in Częstochowa, where he taught at the local gymnasium.

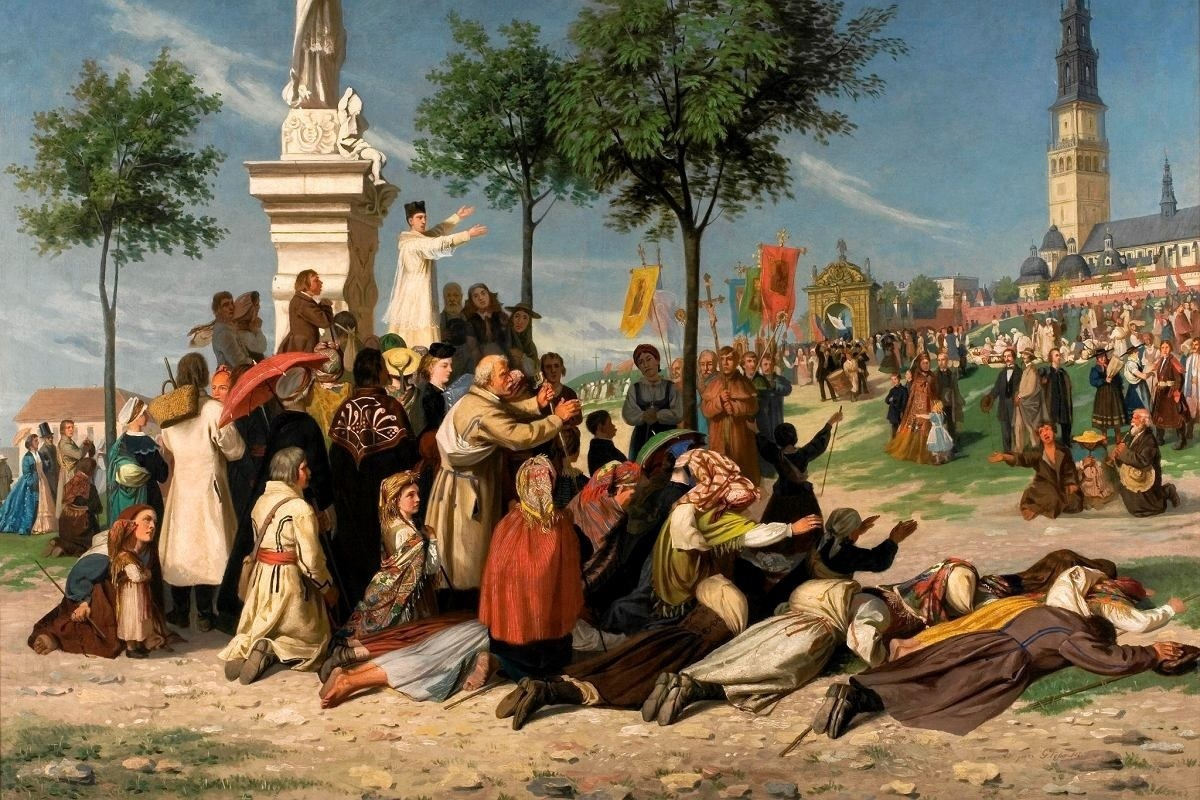
Pilgrims Arriving at Jasna Góra

During this time, he created numerous works related to the Kalisz Region. Many of the buildings he depicted no longer exist, so his paintings have acquired great documentary value. His work includes an album of 52 watercolors of the Jasna Góra Monastery and the ceremonies there. He often accompanied his works with descriptions and commentary, and wrote several articles on the monuments of the region.

In 1873, he moved to Warsaw. There, he began to provide illustrations for Kłosy (Ears), Biesiada Literacka (Literary Feast) and the Tygodnik Illustrowany. He also wrote a major article about his work in Częstochowa for the literary journal Wiek and continued teaching at a school for the deaf as well as giving private lessons.

Many of his lithographs are arranged in "cycles" on religious and historical themes. He also produced several art books for children, including some with cut-out patterns for toys.
