= Małgorzata Turewicz Lafranchi =

Polish-Swiss visual artist

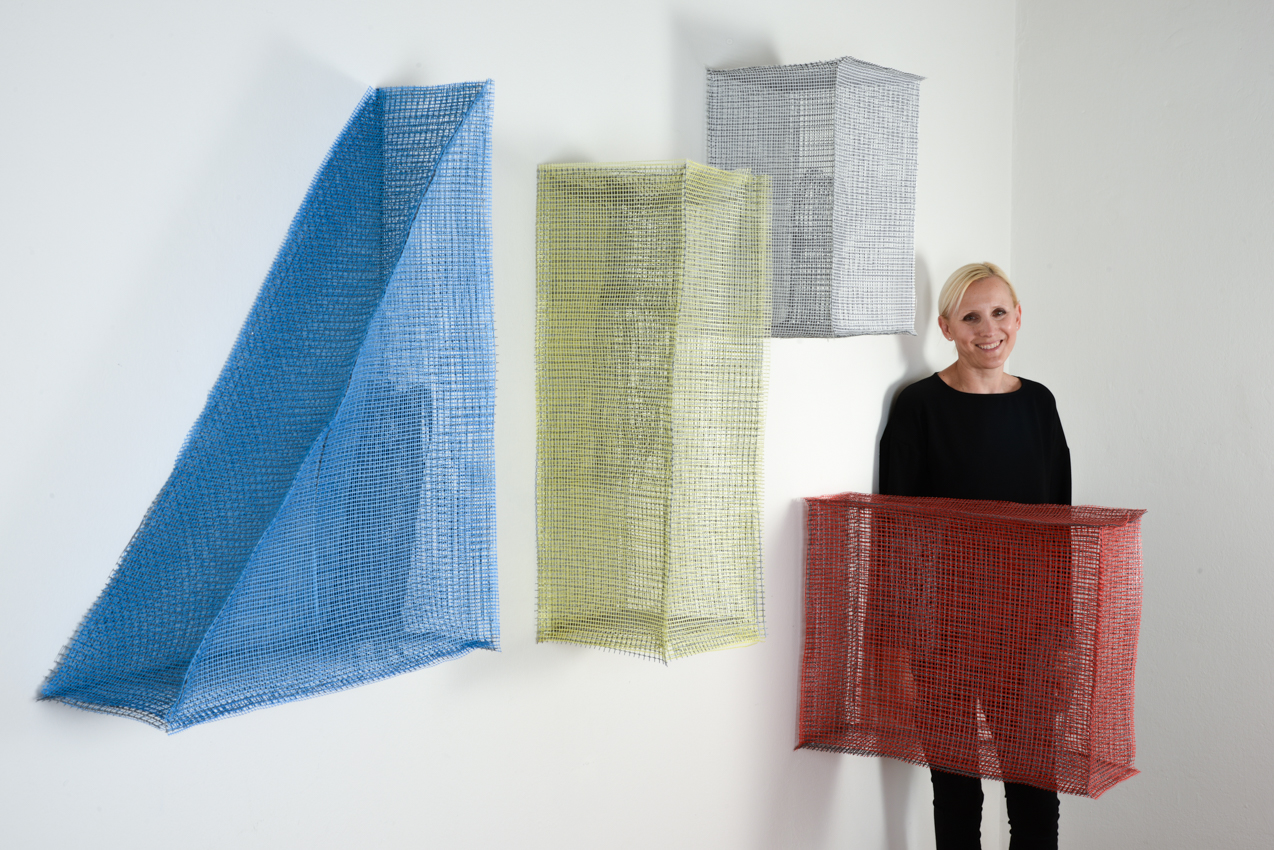

Małgorzata Turewicz Lafranchi is a visual artist. Born in Poland, since 1994 she has lived and worked in Bellinzona in the Ticino canton of Switzerland.

== Biography ==
Lafranchi was born 25 April 1961 in Szczecin, Poland. From 1980 to 1985 she studied at the Academy of Fine Arts in Warsaw under Andrzej Dłużniewski and Henryk Wiśniewski. She graduated with distinction with a thesis on festive rites and ceremonies and between 1985 and 1986 Lafranchi continued her studies at the Goetheanum in Dornach, Switzerland.

Her debut show organized in 1988 by Andrzej Bonarski at the SARP gallery in Warsaw. Her first sculptures shown in 1990 in the Dziekanka Gallery in Warsaw (now in the collection of "Pinakothek der Moderne", Munich) anticipated tendencies in modern sculpture. In the early 1990s she received several grants in Austria (Lenz Schönberg Collection), Spain (Ministry of Culture), and Germany (by Rosemarie Trockel), Poland ( with Marek Kijewski, Konstrukcja w Procesie, Lodz), Center of Polish Sculpture, Oronsko and Switzerland (Artest). Between 2002 and 2004 she contributed to the Peter Zumthor studio on Accademia di Archittetura in Mendrisio. From 2009 to 2011 Lafranchi undertook research for the project "Seduction as Art". Originally planned as a PhD thesis by Walter Kugler at the "Social Sculpture Unit", Oxford Brookes University, it was finalised independently as an exhibition called "The Shell Collector".

In her art she often deals in ironic and playfully ways with scientific and philosophical concepts, giving them new connotations. Typical for Lafranchi's sculptures is the use of quite insignificant industrial materials in a minimalistic, reductive manner that nevertheless gives way to complex associations.

1994 she married Fiorenzo Lafranchi, a Swiss editor and educator, and in 1995 their son Olek was born.

== Exhibitions ==
Lafranchi has participated in numerous solo and group shows including the National Museum Szczecin, Facultad de Bellas Artes, Madrid, Zacheta National Gallery, Warsaw, Turku Museum of Art, Finland, Center for Contemporary Art Ujazdowski Castle, Warsaw, Center of Polish Sculpture, Oronsko, NGBK, Berlin, Museo Cantonale d‘Arte, Lugano, Trinitatiskirche, Köln, Hangar Biccoca, Milano, Pinacoteca Casa Rusca, Locarno, Museo d‘Arte, Lugano, Palastmuseum Wilanów, Art Stations, Poznan, Mazovian Center of Contemporary Art, "Elektrownia", Radom, and Salon Akademii

She also showed her works in the galleries BWA Szczecin, BWA Bialystok, BWA Lublin, Dziekanka Gallery, Warsaw, Zderzak Gallery, Cracow, Visarte Gallery Locarno, Zona Sztuki Aktualnej, Szczecin, Propaganda Gallery Warsaw, Galleria Daniele Agostini, Lugano.

Lafranchi also participated in AVE Videofestival, Arnhem, Holland, in different projects with "Art for the World", Delhi, India, Bex & Arts, Bex, Switzerland and in Rassegna di arte pubblica Morcote.

== Collections ==
Her works are in various collections, including the Academy of Fine Arts‘ Museum in Warsaw, Bonarski Collection, Center for Contemporary Art Ujazdowski Castle in Warsaw, Mazovian Center of Contemporary Art „Elektrownia“, Radom, Museo Cantonale d‘Arte, Lugano, Museo Villa dei Cedri, Bellinzona, National Museum in Szczecin, Pinakothek der Moderne, Staatsgalerie Moderner Kunst, München, Zacheta National Gallery of Art, Warsaw and in many private collections.
