= Mieczysław Kościelniak =

Polish artist (1912–1993)

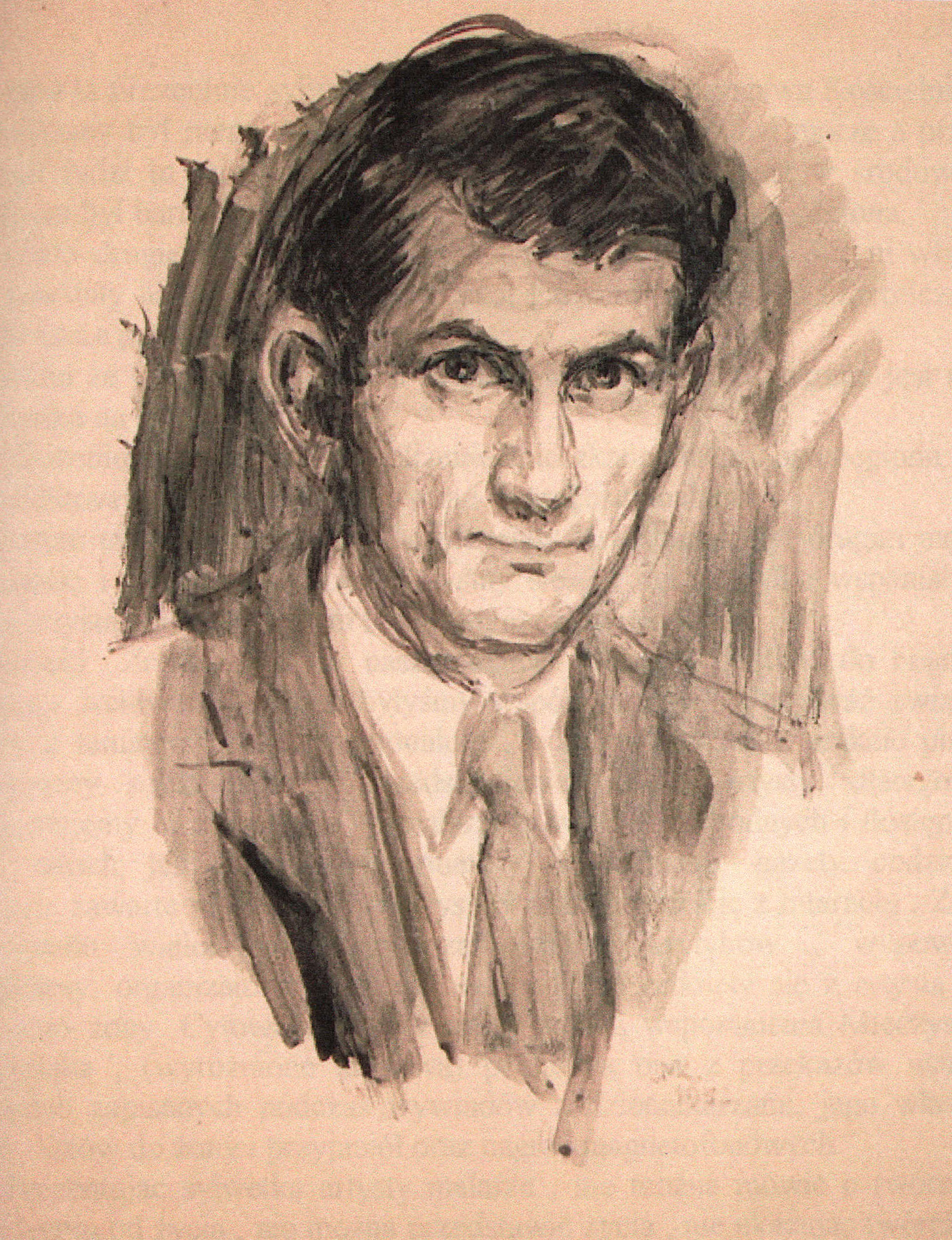
- Born: 29 January 1912; Kalisz, Kalisz Governorate, Congress Poland
- Died: 5 March 1993 (aged 81); Słupsk, Słupsk Voivodeship, Poland
- Resting place: Ustka
- Education: Jan Matejko Academy of Fine Arts
- Awards: Cross of Merit
- Military career
- Allegiance: Polish Armed Forces
- Branch: Poznań Army
- Unit: 70th Infantry Regiment
- Conflicts: Polish Defensive War of 1939; Battle of the Bzura

Mieczysław Kościelniak (Polish pronunciation: [mjɛˈt͡ʂɨswaf kɔˈɕt͡ɕɛlɲak]; 29 January 1912 in Kalisz – 5 March 1993 in Słupsk) was a Polish painter, graphic designer, and draftsman, brother of Władysław and Tadeusz Kościelniak.

Already a prominent artist, he was arrested in 1941 and sent to the Auschwitz concentration camp. His camp number was 15261. In the camp he drew about 300 paintings depicting the everyday life of prisoners. His work is currently displayed in the Auschwitz-Birkenau State Museum. During his imprisonment in Auschwitz, he met fellow prisoner Bronislaw Czech, a three-time Polish Olympian, and helped refine Czech's artistic talents. He also befriended Maximilian Kolbe, a Catholic priest who was murdered in Auschwitz and was canonized by the Catholic Church in 1982.

At the end of the War in May 1945, he was liberated by the 3rd Armored Cavalry Group at the Ebensee Concentration Camp in Austria, near the town of Seewaichen on the Atter Kammer See. He painted a number of portraits of U.S. military personnel at that time, including one of Colonel James H Polk, commander of the 3rd Cavalry Group (now in the possession of Col. Polk's family).

Kościelniak became a member of the Association of European Culture (SEC), and was awarded the National Education Committee Medal, the Gold Cross of Merit, and the Medal in the Service of Polish Education.

After the war, Kościelniak moved to Warsaw, then to Ustka in 1979 and finally, in 1989, to Słupsk. He died in 1993 and is buried at the Ustka cemetery. One of the streets of the city now bears his name.
