= Włodzimierz Antkowiak =

Polish poet and painter

Włodzimierz Antkowiak (born 30 October 1946, in Grudziądz) is a Polish poet and painter.

== Notable works ==
- Przychodzę na stadion tych, którzy cie kochali (poetry, 1975)
- Pewnego dnia na wysokościach (Stories, 1979)
- Po co te gwiazdy (poetry, 1980)
- Brat wszystkich (Stories, 1983)
- Monstra świata (Stories, 1989)
- Nie odkryte skarby, Antkowiak, Włodzimierz, 13-02-04, ISBN 83-11-09200-1
