= Adam Gerżabek =

Polish painter

Adam Gerżabek (1898–1965) was a Polish painter.
