= Danuta Joppek =

Polish artist and painter

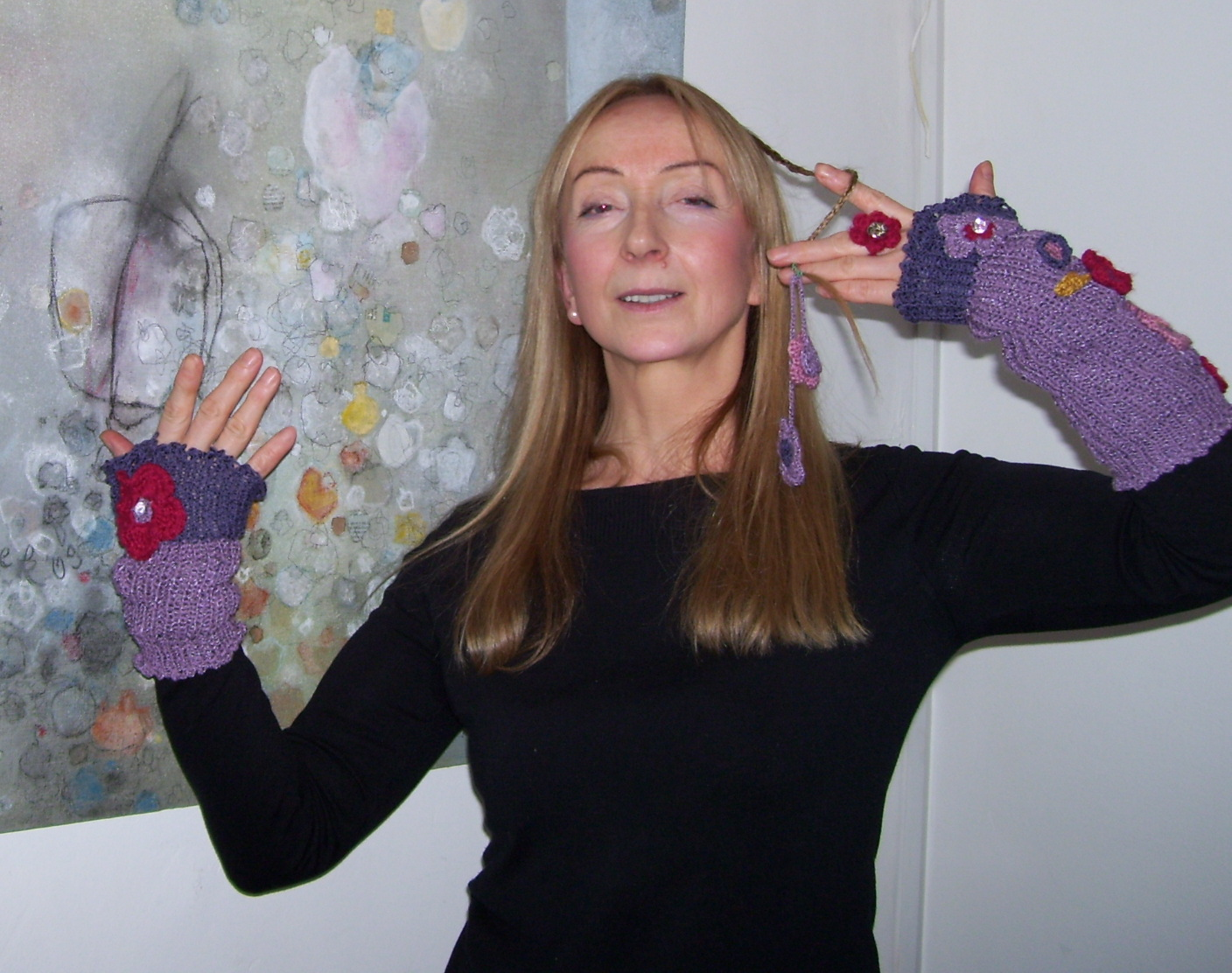
Danuta Joppek, 2009

Danuta Joppek is a Polish artist and painter. She was curator and co-organiser of some exhibitions in Poland and abroad, and the author of analytical texts about art.

== Biography ==
She was born in 1955 in Węglówka, Poland. She graduated from graduated from the Wychowanie Plastyczne, Państwowa Wyższa Szkoła Sztuk Plastycznych ( now: Jan Matejko Academy of Fine Arts) in 1989 and the Malarstwo i Grafika, Państwowa Wyższa Szkoła Sztuk Plastycznych (now: ASP) in 1990. From 1986 through 1991 she worked as a scenery designer for Teatr Wybrzeże in Gdańsk.

She is a member the Association of Polish Artists and Designers. Her work is in the collection of the National Museum, Gdańsk.
