= Jacek Papla =

Polish graphic artist and painter

Włodzimierz Jacek Papla (born 16 January 1951 in Poznań) is a Polish graphic artist and painter, a director of the Institute of Fine Arts at the University of Zielona Góra.

Papla, who graduated from the Academy of Fine Arts in Poznań in 1976, is an exhibiting artist since 1975. He took part in numerous leading national and international shows, and in 1985 was awarded the Stanisław Wyspiański Prize for the Young Artists. Papla is the president of Stowarzyszenie Polskich Artystów Malarzy i Grafików "Wielkopolska".

== Individual exhibitions ==
- 1975 - Galeria Cicibor, Poznan
- 1980 - Galeria BWA, Przemysl
- 1981 - Muzeum Salgotarian, Wegry
- 1982 - Galeria BWA, Konin
- 1985 - Galeria BWA, Poznan
- 1986 - Galeria BWA, Lodz
- 1986 - Galeria Petite, Kopenhanga
- 1988 - Galeria Bazart, Poznan
- 1988 - Galeria AVE, Berlin
- 1991 - Galeria BWA, Gniezno
- 2002 - Muzeum Reginalne, Krokowa
- 2003 - Biblioteka Sztuki, Uniwersytet Zielonogórski
- 2003 - "Pokaz w toku", Galeria miejska Aresenal, Poznan
- 2005 - "Grafika Jacka Papla", Galeria SPAMiG, Poznan

== Group exhibitions ==
1978 - Wystawa grafiki, Krajobrazy, Galeria ON Poznan
1978 - Ogolnopolska Wystawa Mlodej Grafiki, BWA Poznan
1978 - Ogolnopolska Wystawa Mlodej Grafiki, Zacheta, Warszawa
1978 - Miedzynarodowe Biennale Grafiki, Kraków
1978 - Intergrafika, Katowice
1978 - Miedzynarodowe Triennale Rysunku, Wroclaw
1979 - Wystawa Grafiki Polskiej, Sofia
1979 - Czas zatrzymany, Lodz, Poznan
1979 - Mloda Grafika, Kilonia
1980 - Poznanscy Laureaci Nagrod i konkursow ogolnopolskich, Poznan
1980 - Graficy z Poznania BWA Sopo
1980 - 10xGrafika, BWA, Zielona Gora
1980 - Miedzynarodowe Biennale Gafiki, Kraków
1980 - Intergrafia, Katowice
1980 - Przestrzen w Rzezbie i Grafice, Muzeum, Gniezno
1980 - Sztuka Mlodych, Lodz
1980 - Graficy z Poznania, Dom plastyka, Warszawa
1980 - Ogolnopolska Wystawa Grafiki, Zacheta, Warszawa
1981 - Graficy z Poznania, Liege (Belgia)
1981 - Polska Grafika, Praga
1981 - Polska Grafika, Piszczany
1981 - Polska Grafika, Plowdiw
1983 - Miedzynarodowe Biennale Grafiki, Baden-Baden
1983 - Miedzynardowe Biennale Grafiki, Spa
1984 - Biennale Grafiki, Kraków
1984 - Pokonkursowa Wystawa Grafiki, Lodz
1984 - Intergrafik, Berlin
1984 - Kolor w Grafice Polskiej, Torun
1985 - Laureaci wystaw Mlodej Grafiki, BWA Poznan
1986 - Biennale Grafiki, Kraków
1986 - Intergrafia, Katowice
1986 - I.Triennale Rysunku, Kalisz
1986 - Wystawa Mlodej Grafiki Polskiej, Berlin
1986 - Statens 99, Oslo
1988 - I.Wystawa ZPAMiG, Poznan
1989 - 2.Miedzynarodowy Festiwal Sztuki, Belgia
1992 - Postawy, Galeria PWSSP Poznan
1993 - Indywidualnoscw wielosci, galeria Palac Kultury, Poznan
1995 - Wystawa Grafiki, Lodz
2000 - Pracownicy Instytutu Sztuki i Kultury Plastycznej, Muzeum w Zielonej Gorze
2006 - Zielona Grafika.pl, Instytut Sztuk Pieknych UZ w Zielonej Gorze

== Awards ==
- Nagroda - Stypendium Ogolnopolskiego Konkursu Grafiki w Poznaniu, 1978
- Nagroda - Prezydenta Lodzi na VI Ogolnopolskim Konkursie Grafiki w Lodzi, 1979
- Wyroznienie na 7. Pokonkurswe Wystawie Grafiki Lodz 1981 - Nagroda Artystyczna Mlodych im. Stanislawa Wyspianskiego, 1985
