= Józef Cempla =

- Born: Józef Cempla; 1918; Bielitz, Austrian Silesia, Austria-Hungary
- Died: 2004; Kraków, Poland
- Education: School of Fine Arts, Kraków
- Known for: Painting, drawing

Józef Cempla (1918–2004) was a Polish artist, painter, drawer, professor of School of Fine Arts, Kraków, born in Bielsko-Biała, Poland). He studied in National Institute of Fine Arts and School of Fine Arts in Kraków, he in the Interior Design faculty. He graduated from the Academy with honours. From 1945 to 1950 he worked as an artist in the textile industry. Since 1951 he was a lecturer and a director of the Initial Design Studio at the Architectural Design Department at the School of Fine Arts. At the time he also organized the Bielsko-Biała branch of ZDAP (Union of Polish Artists and Designers) - he was its co-founder.

He took part in numerous exhibitions - on local, national and international level, as well, as having some individual ones. His works can be found in many renowned museums. Ha made numerous artistic journeys around the country and abroad. His works were published in many albums.

== Publications ==
- Wawel : zamek królewski, wyd. Starodruk, Kraków 1956
- Wawel : komnaty królewskie, wyd. Centrala Przemysłu Ludowego i Artystycznego, Kraków 1957
- Wawel : katedra królewska, wyd. Starodruk, Kraków 1957
- Holy stones; remnants of synagogues in Poland, drawings, wyd. Dvir Pub. Co, Tel Aviv 1959
- Kraków miasto królewskie, wyd. Quest Art Publishers, ISBN 83-916060-2-3, Bielsko-Biała 2002

== See also ==
- Academy of Fine Arts in Kraków
- Culture of Kraków

== Sources ==
- Note about the author by Joanna Pietrzykowska from Kraków miasto królewskie, wyd. Quest Art Publishers, ISBN 83-916060-2-3, Bielsko-Biała 2002
- Exemplary publications in National Library of Poland See the list of publications
