= Wanda Gołkowska =

Polish artist (1925–2013)

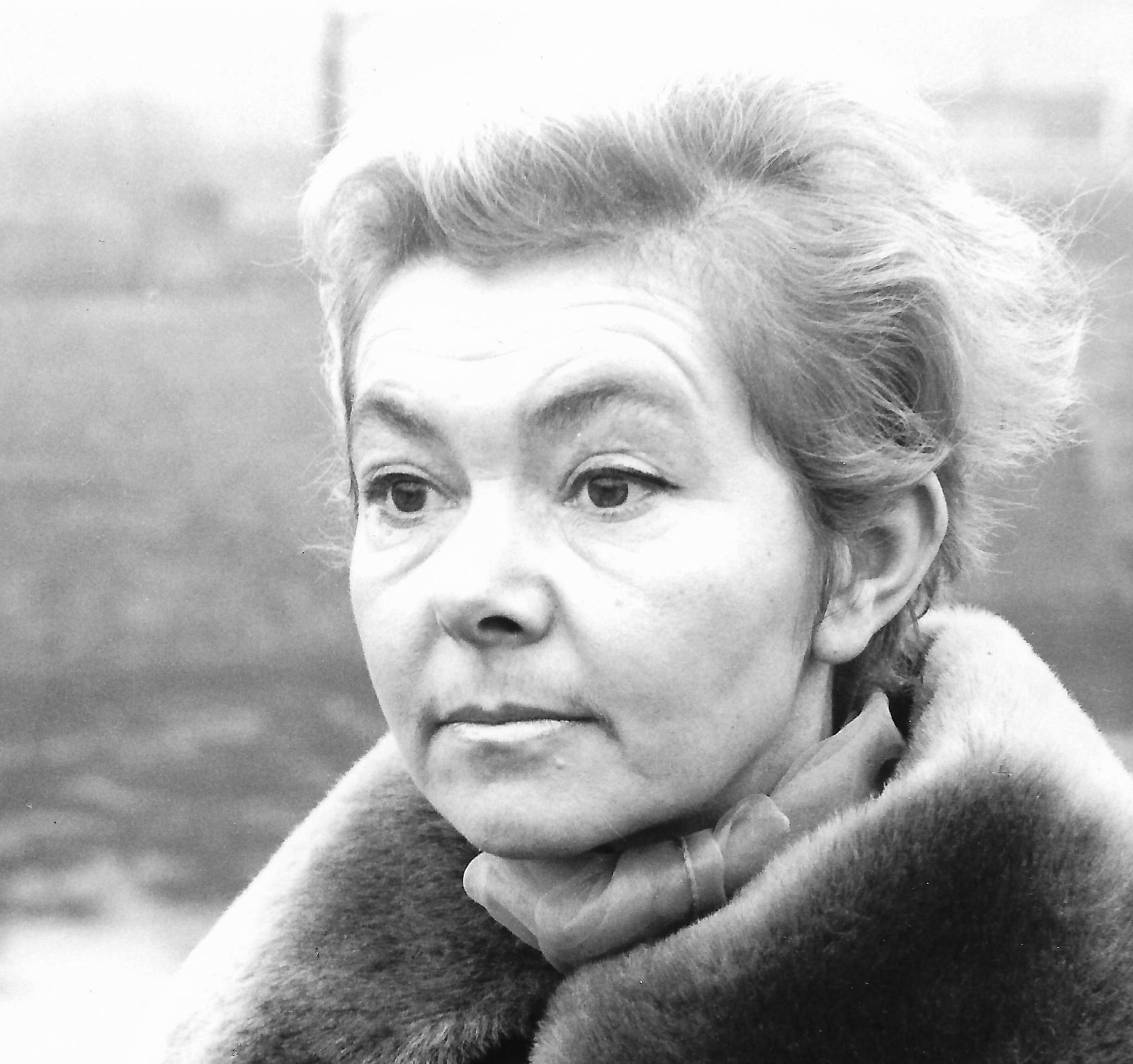
- Gołkowska in 1975
- Born: 17 December 1925; Rzeszów, Poland
- Died: 7 August 2013 (aged 87); Wrocław, Poland
- Known for: Artist, painter
- Movement: Conceptualism, op art

Wanda Gołkowska (17 December 1925 – 7 August 2013) was a Polish artist.

== Background ==
Gołkowska was born on 17 December 1925, in Rzeszów. She attended the primary school in Grajewo. In 1946, Gołkowska started studying at the Faculty of Humanities at the University of Torun, but she and her family moved to Wrocław in the same year. From 1946 to 1952, Gołkowska studied at the Faculty of Painting at the Academy of Fine Arts in Wrocław, in the studio of Eugeniusz Geppert. In 1991, she became a full professor at the Eugeniusz Geppert Academy of Fine Arts. Between 1953 and 2006, Gołkowska took part in around 300 group exhibitions, and events, and presented over 30 individual exhibitions in Poland and abroad. She died on 7 August 2013, in Wrocław.

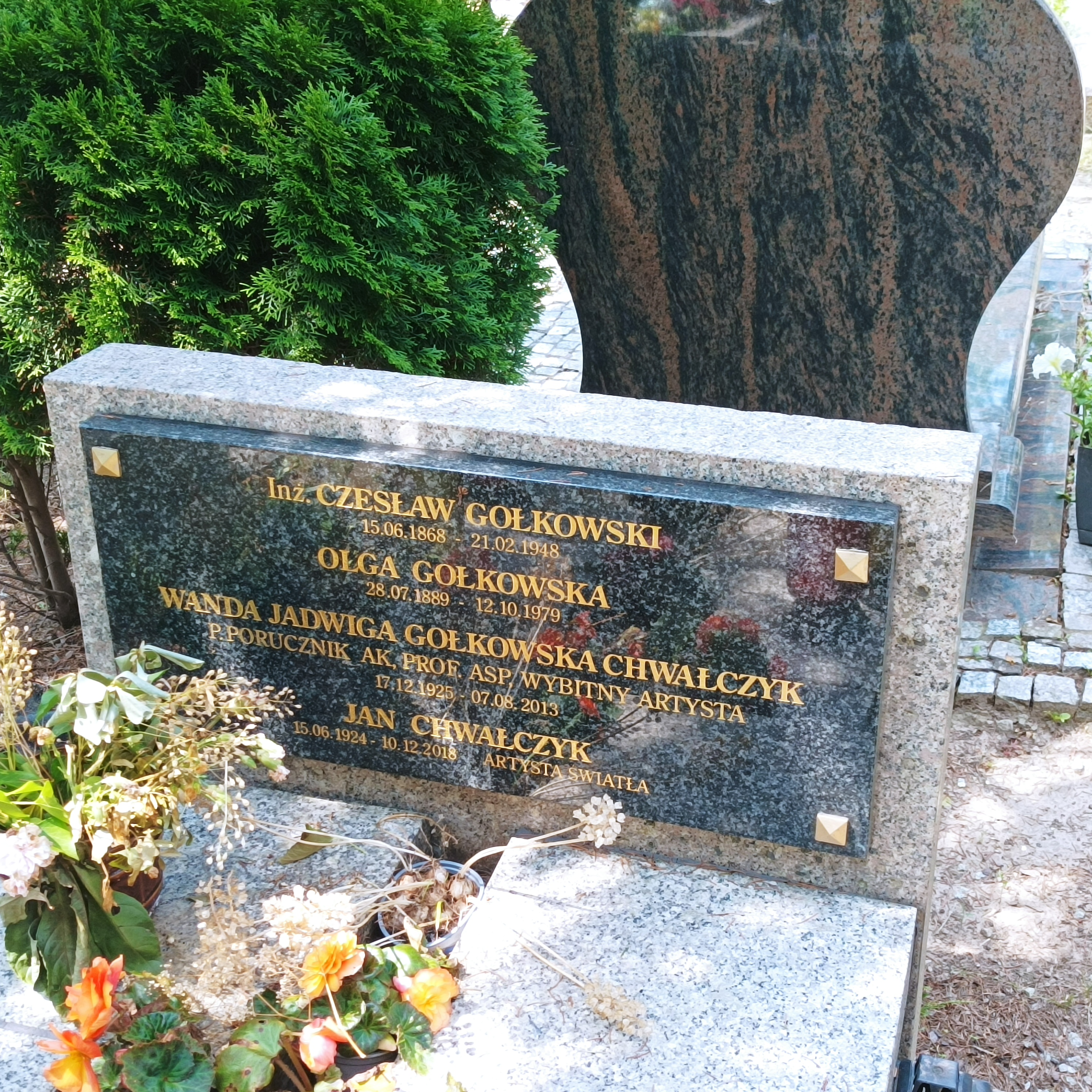
The grave of Wanda Gołkowska and Jan Chwałczyk at the Osobowice Cemetery

== Gallery ==
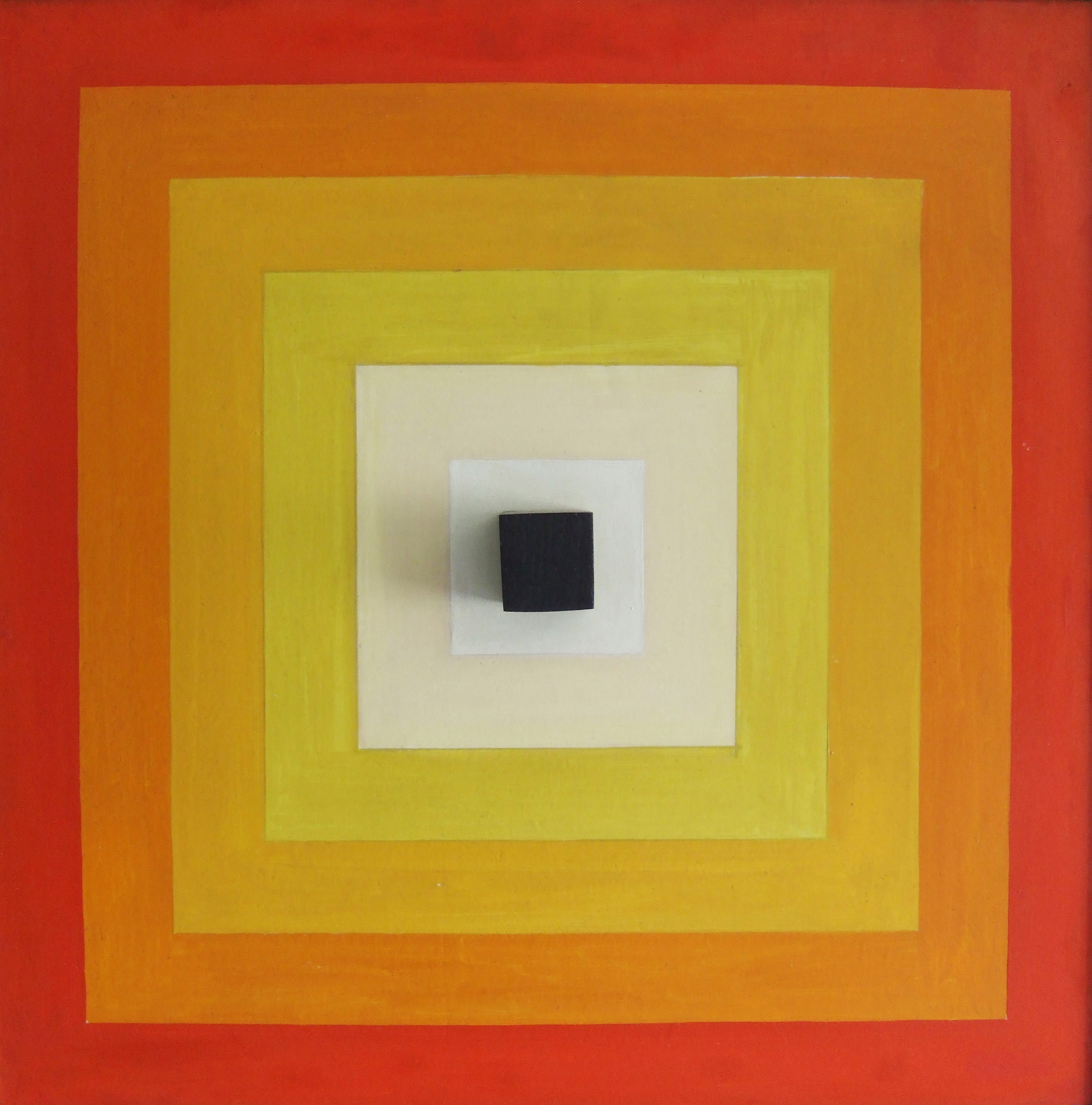
Tablica z kwadratami I, 1969

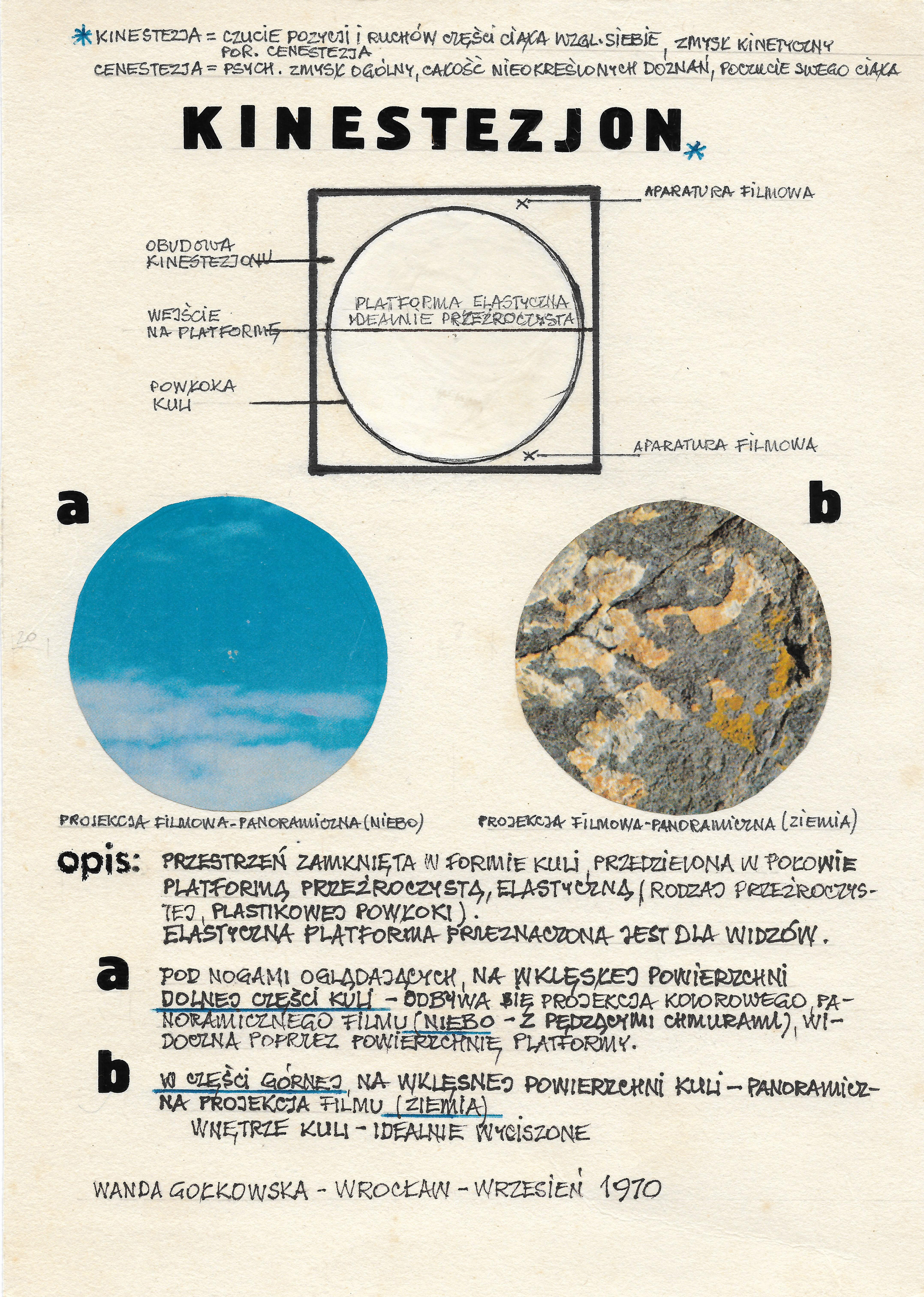
Kinestezjon, 1970

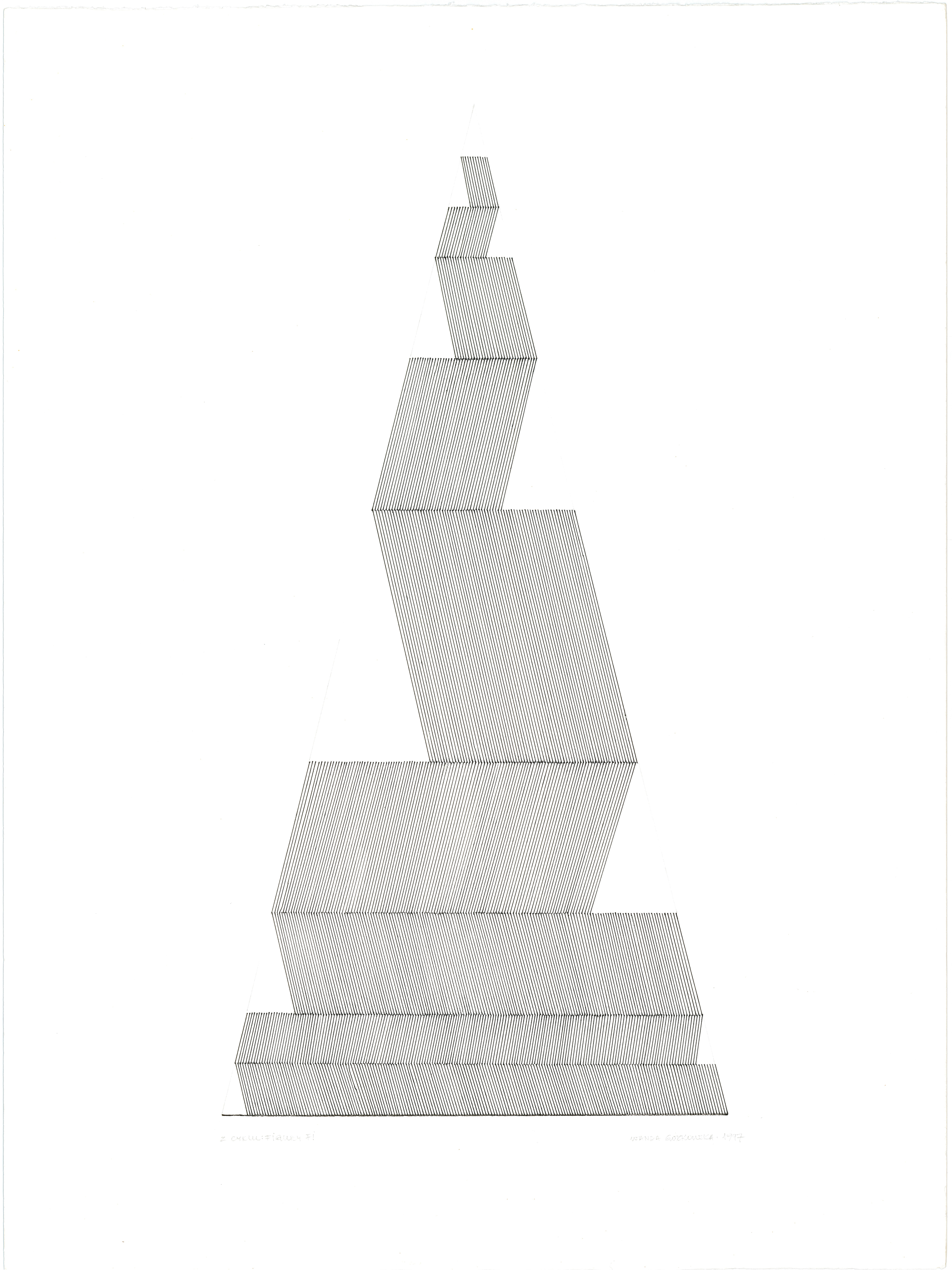
Figury Fi, 1997
