= Henryk Cieszkowski =

Polish painter (1835–1895)

- Born: Henryk Cieszkowski; 1835; Płock, Poland
- Died: 1895 (aged 59–60); Rome, Italy
- Education: School of Fine Arts in Warsaw
- Known for: Painting

Henryk Cieszkowski (born 1835 in Płock, died 1895 in Rome) was a Polish painter. Henryk Cieszkowski completed his secondary education in Lublin, between the years of 1848 to 1856 he studied at the Schools of Fine Arts in Warsaw, where he was taught by Christian Breslauer (1802-1882). In 1858, he gained a scholarship and moved to Rome, where he lived permanently. From 1860, the artist sent his artwork to Warsaw to the Society of the Incentive for Fine Arts (Towarzystwo Zachęty Sztuk Pięknych) and Krywult's Salon (Salon Krywulta); and to Kraków, to the Society of Friends of Fine Arts (Towarzystwo Przyjaciół Sztuk Pięknych). His friend Henryk Siemiradzki, moved to Italy from Munich, Germany in 1872.

Most of the artist's artwork are landscape paintings of Rome and its surroundings; mainly the Roman Campagna. He marked these paintings with H. Cieszkowski Roma. During his lifetime in the twentieth century, his paintings were most popularly sold in Italy, to Great Britain, and the United States of America. Currently, the artist's artwork is located inter alia in: National Museum in Warsaw, Kraków, and Poznań. Between the years of 2000 to 2010 several of the artist's artwork have appeared at the Christie's Auction House in Poland, Sweden, and the United Kingdom.

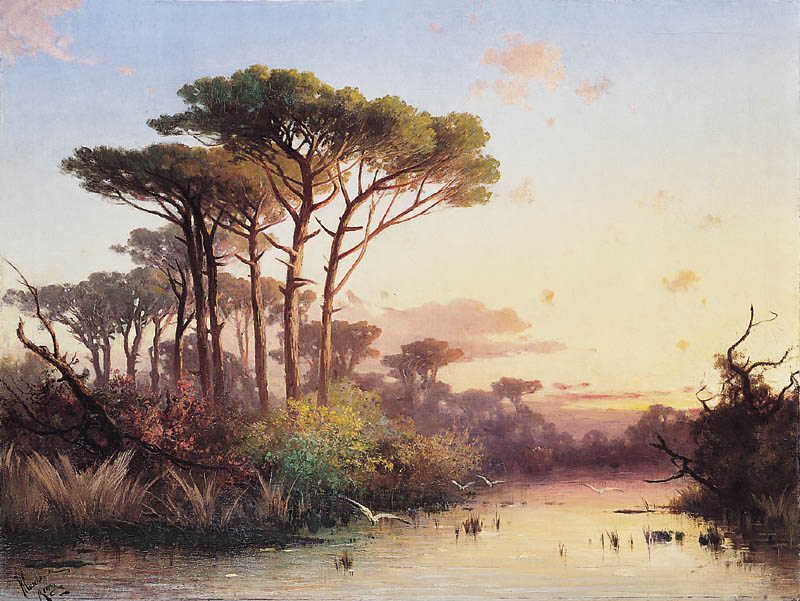
Pines by the water

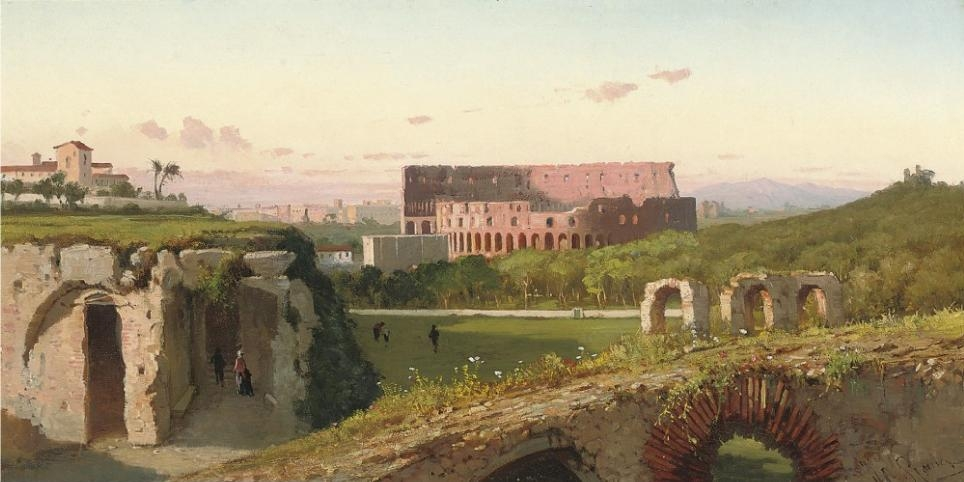
View of the Colosseum

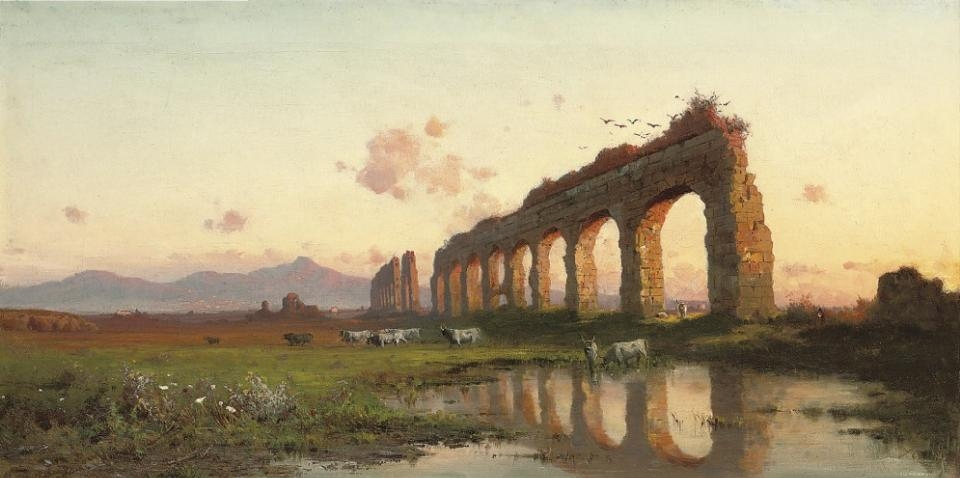
Ruins in Italy

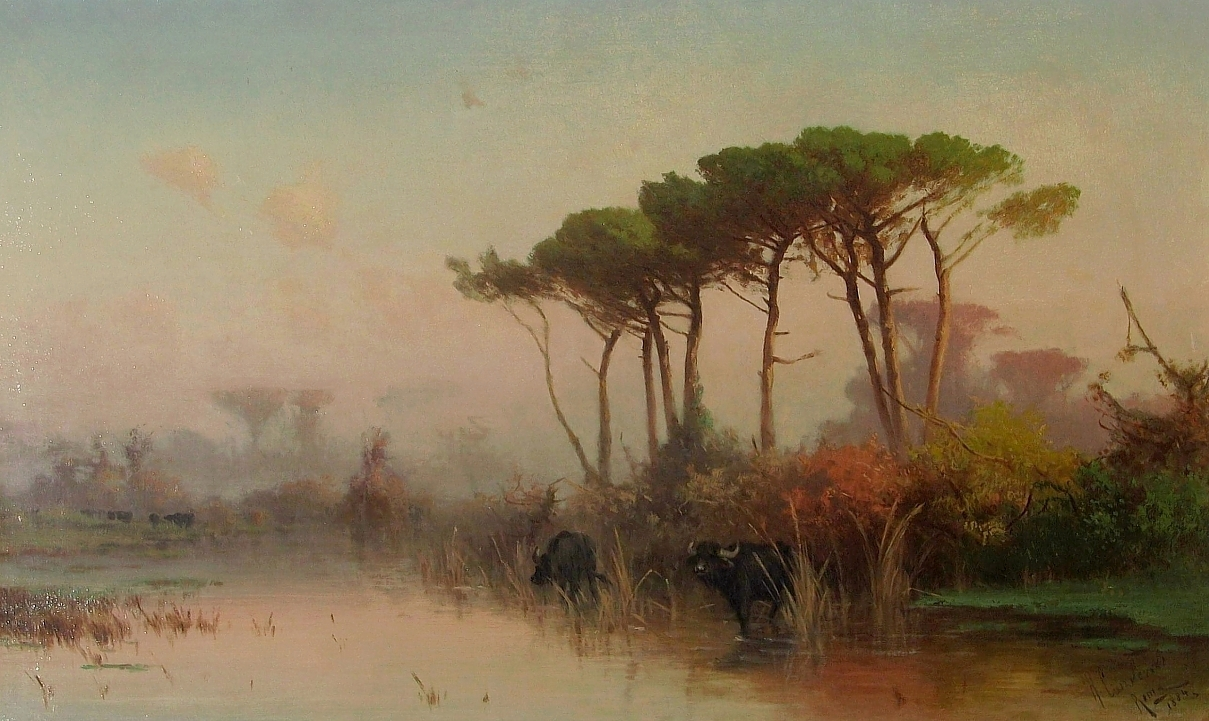
Pines

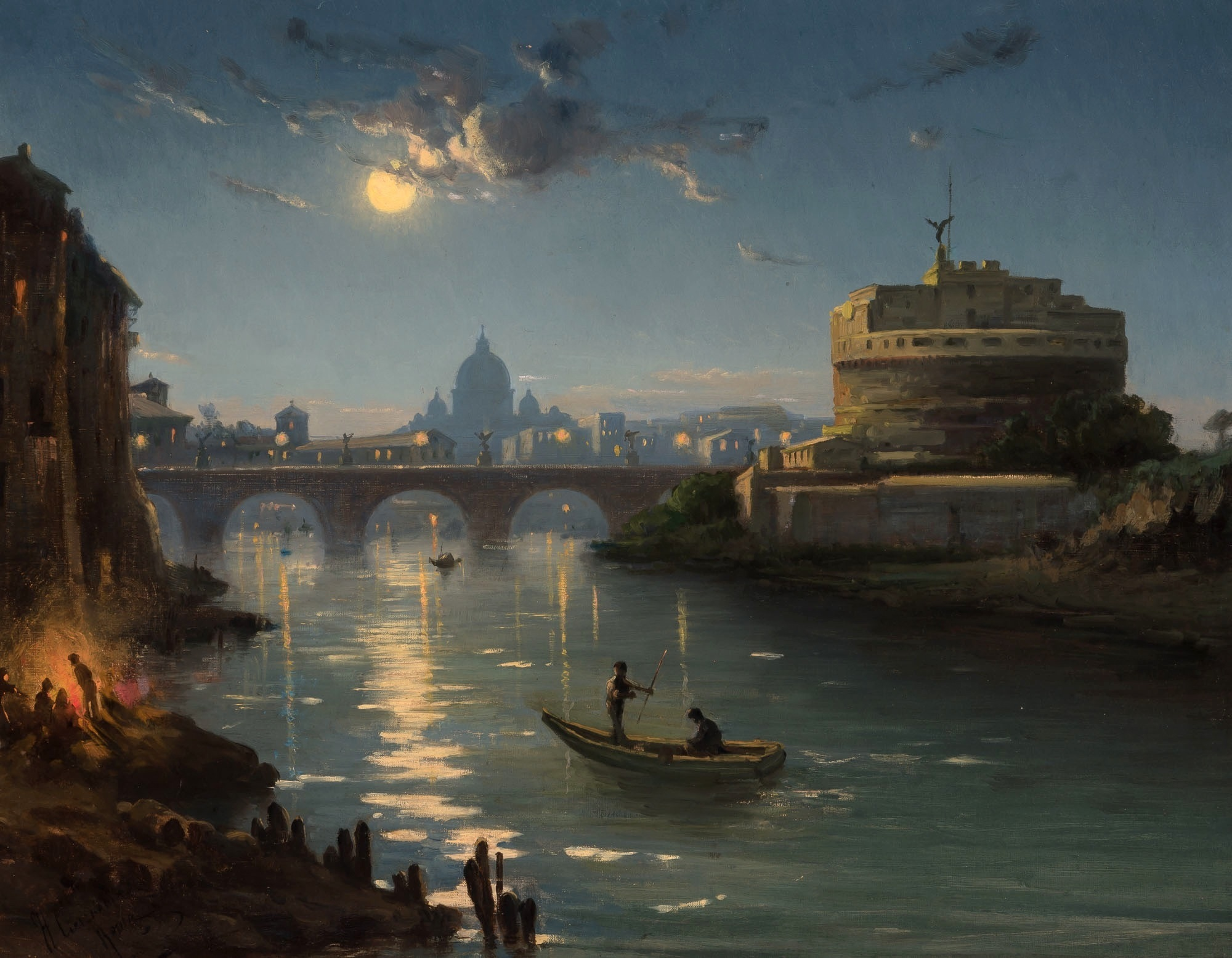
View of Rome by Night
