= Wojciech Sadley =

Polish painter (1932–2023)

Wojciech Sadley (3 April 1932 – 5 October 2023) was a Polish painter and professor at Warsaw University School of Fine Arts. Sadley was born in Lublin on 3 April 1932, and died on 5 October 2023, at the age of 91.
