= Abraham Straski =

American painter

- Born: 1903; Poland
- Died: 1987 (aged 83–84)
- Known for: Painting

Abraham Straski (1903–1987) was a Polish born painter who moved to the United States after surviving the Nazi concentrations camps in the Holocaust. His works are usually representations of rabbis done in warm, rich colors.

== Life ==
Straski was raised in pre-World War II Europe as a devout follower of the Jewish faith. While growing up, he grew close to Rabbis in his community who taught him violin, cello, and the Torah. He drew his inspiration for art from the Rabbis surrounding him in his local community. During World War II, his family was forced into a concentration camp.

While in the camps, Straski whenever possible saved small pieces of scrap paper and made thumbnail sketches of his teachers who he vowed would never be forgotten. It is said "he kept his sanity by painting the Rabbis of his youth.".
