= Zbigniew Nowosadzki =

Polish painter

Zbigniew Nowosadzki (born July 22, 1957 in Zamość, Poland) is a prominent Polish painter.

He was trained at the Secondary Art School in Zamość and Institute of Artistic Education at the Maria Curie-Skłodowska University in Lublin, graduating in 1983. Between 1987 and 1992 he was managing ‘Żar’ (‘Fervour’) Gallery at the primary school in Warsaw. Between 1997 and 2004 he had been artistic manager of ‘Otwarte Koło’ (‘Open Circle’) Gallery.

He has had 27 one-man exhibitions in Poland and Belgium (Brussels) and has taken part in about 80 group exhibitions in Poland, Cyprus (Nicosia), France (Meulan, Verneuil sur Seine), Argentina (Buenos Aires) and USA (New York, New Britain, Stamford, Connecticut). His works are in private collections in Austria, Belgium, Canada, Cyprus, France, Germany, Greece, the Netherlands, Hungary, Italy, Poland, Switzerland and United States. He is a member of Polish artistic group 'Via Varsovia' and American group 'Emotionalists'.
