= Józef Bełch =

Polish painter

Józef Bełch (4 July 1909 in Różanka – 10 September 1993 in Korczyna) was a Polish Catholic priest and an officer in the Home Army.
