= Roman Lipski =

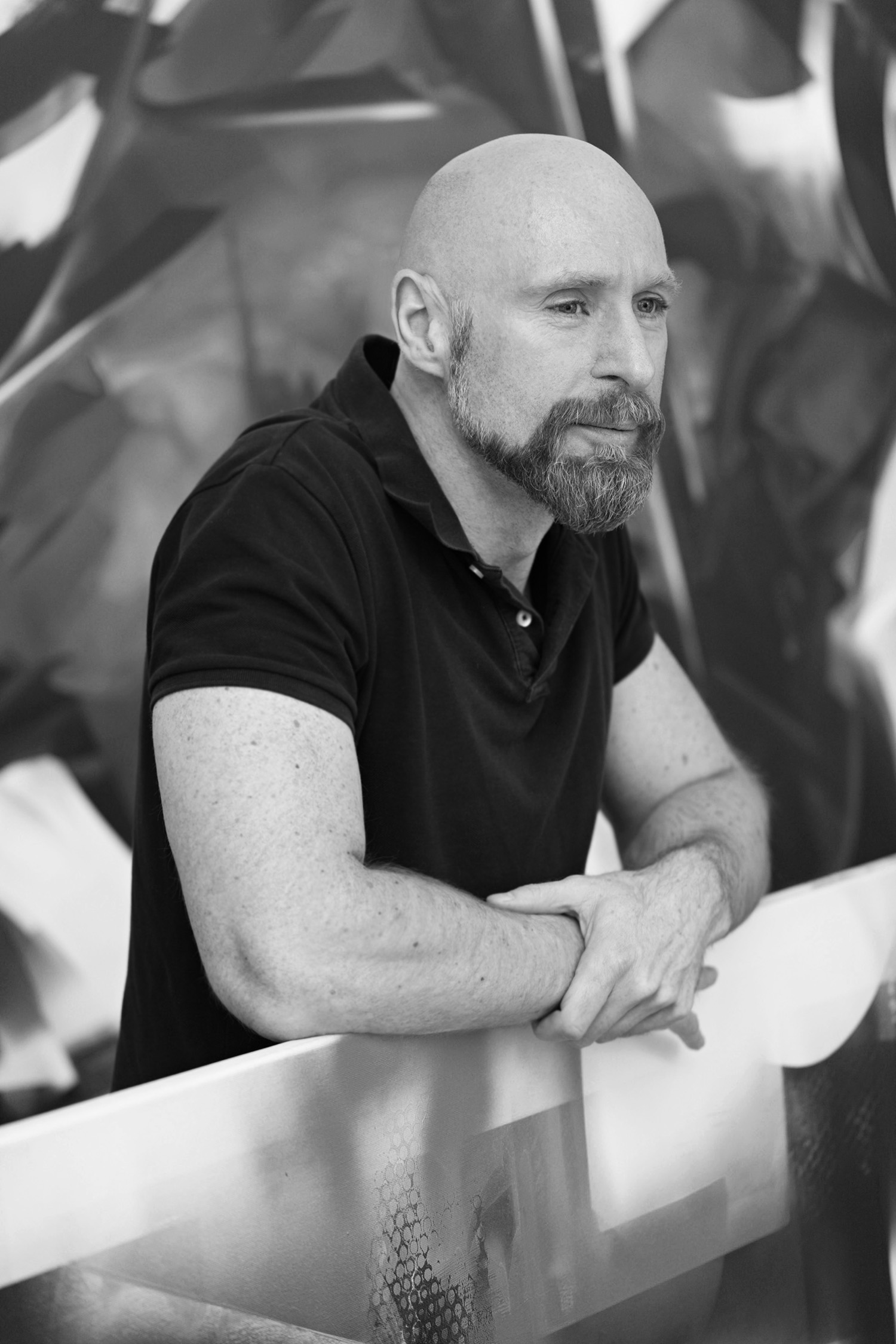
- 2022, photographed by Hans-Georg Gaul
- Born: 1969 (age 55–56); Nowy Dwór Gdański, Poland
- Occupation: Artist
- Website: www.romanlipski.com

Roman Lipski (born 1969) is a Polish-born artist.

== Early life and education ==
Roman Lipski, a native of Nowy Dwór Gdański, Poland, immigrated to West Berlin at age 19 in 1989 to escape a predestined technical college education and the limitations of his small hometown. At age 21, Lipski's artistic journey began in Berlin, a common destination for Polish immigrants in the late 1980s. His desire to become a painter set him apart from his contemporaries.

Beginning with a painting course in Kreuzberg, he progressed to studying at "Die Etage" art school, immersing himself in Berlin's artistic community and the city's multicultural atmosphere. Lipski and other artists leveraged the vacant spaces in East Berlin that became available following the fall of the Berlin Wall.

In the mid-1990s, Lipski played a key role in the "Club of Polish Failures", contributing to the "Small Manifesto of Polish Failures", participating in multiple art-related roles, and becoming an editor, writer, and graphic artist for the magazine "Kolano".

== Career ==
As a self-taught artist, Lipski submitted his works to the Festival of Polish Contemporary Painting in 2004 and became a laureate. This recognition served as a catalyst, motivating Lipski to focus his efforts on painting.

In 2005, Erich Marx became Lipski's patron. Over the next two years, Marx acquired several of Lipski's landscape and narrative paintings, which are now housed in the Marx Collection.

In 2016, Lipski started to integrate artificial intelligence technology into his artwork creation. With the help of Florian Dohmann, he developed an AI software called Artificial Muse, demonstrating artificial intelligence's capability in art. This innovation served as an inspirational tool, not a replacement for traditional methods, leading to Lipski's shift from representational to abstract art. Lipski is a pioneer in quantum art, specifically Quantum Blur, which employs quantum operations to manipulate images.

Lipski's artwork is owned by notable figures including Guido Westerwelle, the German Foreign Minister, and film director Volker Schlöndorff. His work also features in the collection of collector Erich Marx, Marx's collection is now housed in Berlin's Hamburger Bahnhof Museum of Contemporary Art. His artwork is also showcased in collections such as the Julia Stoschek Foundation, the Alex Katz Foundation, the Elgiz Museum of Contemporary Art, the Colby College Museum of Art, National Museum Szczecin and the Museum of Fine Arts in Boston.

== Artistic style ==
Lipski's artistic style has transitioned from traditional landscape painting to quantum art. Seeking a shift towards abstraction and vibrant hues, he collaborated with data scientist Florian Dohmann. Using 60 digitized paintings of Lipski, an algorithm was trained to comprehend and recreate his style.

The AI-generated images provided a range of interpretations of Lipski's work, some of which Lipski integrated into his own creative process. This resulted in an iterative cycle between Lipski's physical painting and the AI's digital output.

Lipski's collaborations extend to Swiss quantum physicists, using their software "Quantum Blur" to manipulate images based on quantum phenomena. The dialogue has helped inspire new ideas for both parties. This process has also been utilized by scientists to visually represent quantum physical processes.

== Selected exhibitions ==
- 2023: This Permanent Other Landscape, Julia Stoschek Foundation, Berlin
- 2020: Living in The Present Future, National Museum in Szczecin, The Museum of Contemporary Art, Poland
- 2019: Living in The Present Future, Bornholm Art Museum, Gudhjem, Denmark
- 2018: A.I.R. - Sophisticated Art, Munich, Germany
- 2018: Spannungsfelder, Futurium, Berlin, Germany
- 2018: Nahtstellen, Kunstverein Kärnten, Kaernten, Austria
- 2018: Beyond Festival, Zentrum für Kunst und Medien, Karlsruhe, Germany
- 2017: Landschaften aus dem Netz, The Ballery, Berlin, Germany
- 2017: 50 Contemporary Artists by Enter Art Foundation, Multipolster, Berlin, Germany
- 2016: Erections & Elusive Spaces, The Ballery, Berlin, Germany
- 2015: An Artist's Gift: Acquisitions, Alex Katz Foundation, Colby Museum of Art, Waterville, USA
- 2015: Otwarta kolekcja, National Museum in Szczecin, The Museum of Contemporary Art, Poland
- 2014: Roman Lipski. Malarstwo, National Museum in Szczecin, The Museum of Contemporary Art, Poland
- 2014: Roman Lipski. Malerei, Kraszewski-Museum, Dresden, Germany
- 2014: Roman Lipski in der Deutschen Botschaft Warszawa, Botschaft der Bundesrepublik Deutschland, Warsaw, Poland
- 2013: Roman Lipski: Malerei, Polnisches Institut Berlin, Germany
- 2013: On Alienation/Estrangement, Elgiz Museum of Contemporary Art, Istanbul, Turkey
- 2013: Schöne Landschaft - Bedrohte Natur, Kunsthalle Osnabrück, Germany
- 2013: Andratx Open III, Centro Cultural Andratx, Mallorca, Spain
- 2012: Roman Lipski. Malerei, Polnisches Institut, Düsseldorf, Germany
- 2012: Interior Visions: Selections from the Collection by Alex Katz, Colby Museum of Art, Waterville, U.S.
- 2012: A Sense of Place: Landscapes from Monet to Hockney, Bellagio Gallery of Fine Art, Las Vegas
- 2012: Myth and Melancholy, MWW - Wroclaw Contemporary Museum, Wroclaw, Poland
- 2012: Sammlung Marx. Eine Auswahl, Muzeum Narodowe, Szczecinie, Poland
- 2011: Roman Lipski im Schloss Genshagen, Stiftung Genshagen Berlin-Brandenburgisches Institut, Ludwigsfelde, Germany
- 2011: Kolekcja Marxa. Wybór Sammlung Marx. Eine Auswahl, Atlas Sztuki, Łódź, Poland
- 2011: Polish! Contemporary Art from Poland, Künstlerhaus Bethanien GmbH, Berlin, Germany
- 2011: The Changing Soil: Contemporary Landscape Painting, Nagoya/Boston Museum of Fine Arts, Japan

== Bibliography ==
- Superpositions. Berlin: Distanz Verlag 2022. ISBN 9783954764938.
