= Anna Sobol-Wejman =

Polish printmaker (born 1946)

Anna Sobol-Wejman (born 1946) is a Polish printmaker.

Sobol-Wejman received her diploma from the Academy of Fine Arts in Kraków, where she had studied in the Graphic Arts Department, in 1972; her instructors there were Mieczysław Wejman and Włodzimierz Kunz. In 1985 she led workshops at the Academy of Fine Arts in Reykjavík, and from 1986 until 1990 she managed the Teatr Stu Gallery in Kraków. She has exhibited her work both at home and abroad, and has won a number of prizes during her career. In her work she favors a variety of techniques, including etching, aquatint, and lithography.

Sobol-Wejman's print Cloak Room I of 1997 is owned by the National Gallery of Art in Washington, D.C. Her work is also in the Museum of Modern Art, and the Minneapolis Institute of Art.
