= Marian Ulc =

Polish sculptor

Marian Ulc (born Szałas, Poland, 1947) is a Polish sculptor, representing the naive art movement. His works have been displayed outside Poland, in Germany and Finland for instance.
