= Joshua Budziszewski Benor =

Polish painter, sculptor, and photographer

Joshua Budziszewski Benor (30 May 1950 – 3 June 2006) was a Polish painter, sculptor and photographer.

He studied painting at Academy of Fine Arts in Warsaw, graduating in 1975.
