= Raphaël Kleweta =

Polish artist (1949–2016)

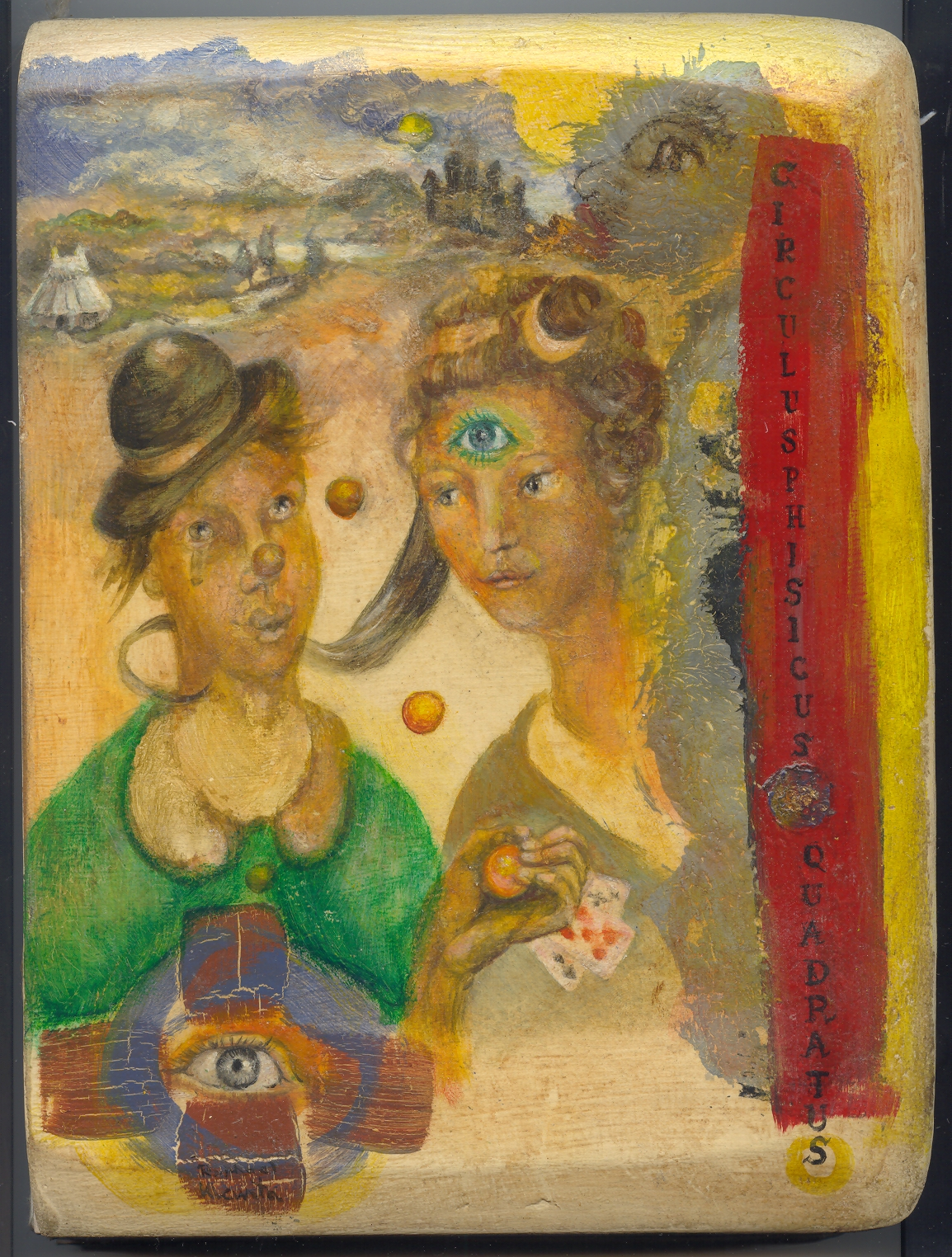
Peinture sur bois by Raphaël Kleweta

Raphaël Augustinus Kleweta otherwise Rafał Augustyn Kleweta (28 May 1949 – 30 April 2016) was a Polish engraver, artist, and art book publisher setting up Anima Mundi Publishing Group, France.

== Life ==
Born in Łódź, Poland, in 1949 into a family of engravers and artists, Kleweta attended the School of Fine Arts in Łódź. He then worked as a draftsman for the Polish film director Jerzy Hoffman on the film The Deluge before getting a scholarship (first official student in Germany in 1971). In 1976 he graduated as a master engraver under Professor Erwin Heerich with a degree from the Kunstakademie in Düsseldorf.

In 1972 he was already listed in Who's Who by Art in Germany. After that, he worked as an independent artist and in 1976 he settled in Aude, the so-called "Cathar Country", in France.

He designed many medals and pieces of jewellery and created many ornaments for the ruling family of Saudi Arabia.

As a painter, he was listed in the official AKOUN book La côte des peintres-1990. In 1989 he set up his publishing company, Anima Mundi, which published fifty titles.

He was listed from 2003 in Who’s Who in France and was awarded many international awards for his work as an engraver.

He represented France in engraving festivals in Portugal and China. His books are in famous libraries and French institutes in Europe, and private collections worldwide.

Kleweta died on 30 April 2016 in France.

== Awards ==
1979 Medal of honor for the wood engraving, (Prize Josef Gielniak) of the museum Jelenia Gora in Poland. Award of the city of Aubière (one of twelve parallel prizes for the whole world for the engraving, on Three-year World of Prints in Chamalière, France).

1995 Medal of honor of the city of Cauterets "Prestige des Arts"- Bronze medal for painting. Prize of the city of Mirepoix for graphic creation. Prize of the city of Fanjeaux for painting.

Represents France in Portugal, Amadora (Biennale de la gravure). Elected by A.M.A.C. (Association of contemporary Art Movement) in 1999.

2000 Mir Art Medal of the city of Salies du Salat, France. Represents France in China, Qingdao (International print exhibition) in 2000. Choice of the Chinese government.

Represents Poland in the European Artists exhibition in Biriatou, France. Choice of "Prismes d’art" in 2002.

Guest of honor in the «Biennale d’Art Contemporain de Navarre» in St. Jean Pied-de-Port, France in May 2005.

== Collections containing his work ==
- Museum of Contemporary Art in Lodz, Poland.
- Museum of Contemporary Art in Düsseldorf, Germany ( Graphische Sammlung Ehrenhof).
- Artothèque of Düsseldorf, Germany.
- Collection of Artists Books in the Nîmes Library, France.
- National Library collection of Toulouse, France.
- National Library collection of Montpellier, France.
- University Library collection of Montpellier
- University Library collection of Lausanne, Switzerland.
- Laverune Museum.
- Pierre Bayle Museum of Carla Bayle (French Pyrénées).
- Mande Library.
- Graveline Library.
- Bagnouls sur Cèze Library.
- Carcassonne Library.
- National collection of the city of Liège, Belgium.
- Ulysse Capitaine Library.
- Kunstsammlung of "Veste Coburg", Germany.
- City of Saint Etienne, "Elsa Triolet" Library.
- Chiroux Library of the city of Liège, Belgium, Official Wallon collections.
- In most French Institutes in Europe.
- In many private collections, worldwide.
