= Maria Seyda =

Polish artist

Maria Seyda née Proszynski (1893–1989) was a Polish artist, known for her portrait paintings, who spent the majority of her career in Britain.

== Biography ==
Seyda was born and brought up in Poland. She studied art at the L'Ecole des Beaux-Arts in Geneva, in Warsaw and at the Académie Colarossi in Paris. She married Marian Seyda, (1879–1967), a journalist who was the Polish minister of foreign affairs and who also served as a minister in the Polish government-in-exile during the Second World War. After spending time in Argentina, Maria Seyda was based in London. Seyda exhibited paintings at the Royal Academy in London from 1943 onwards and also with the Royal Society of Portrait Painters.
