= Bogdan Korczowski =

Polish painter

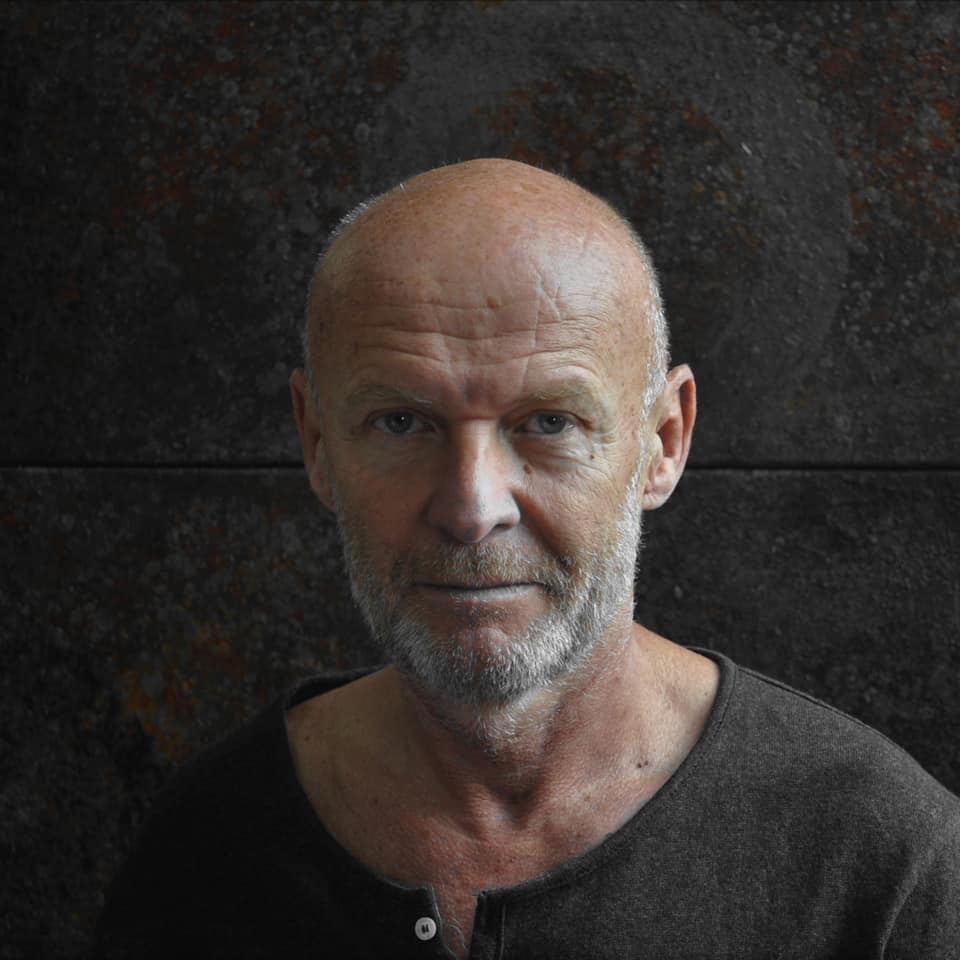
Bogdan Korczowski

Bogdan Korczowski (born 1954) is a Polish contemporary painter.

Korczowski is a native of Kraków, Poland who graduated from the Jan Matejko Academy of Fine Arts (ASP) Kraków. He obtained his diploma in 1978 in the studio of Wlodzimierz Kunz. Next, he moved to Paris to study at the École nationale supérieure des Beaux-Arts, where he was granted a diploma in 1985 in the studio of Abraham Hadad.

In 1980, Korczowski began a series of paintings called The Letters, which included embellished symbols and ideograms. In June 1989 a large solo exhibition Korczowski-Paintings took place in Warsaw's Zacheta National Gallery of Art. It was a proof that despite his debut as a performance artist and general tendency for the contemporary art to experiment with new, cutting edge concepts, Korczowski remained faithful to the most traditional art medium: painting. In 1986, he received "the Regional Council of Ile-de-France Award" in Paris. In 1988, Korczowski received a Pollock-Krasner Foundation grant in New York.

In 1998 the Polish Institute in Paris organized a Korczowski retrospective exhibition. In 2004, he participated in Season Polski in France (Nova Polska). In 2010, BWA in Gorzów Wielkopolski (Poland) presented the Three Decades of Painting 1979-2009 exhibition, which included a retrospective-personal look at Korczowski's work. In 2011 the Paul Delouvrier Museum in Evry/Paris opened an solo exhibition of his latest paintings Orbium Coelestium. In 2012 the Orangerie de Gustave Caillebotte in Yerres/Paris presented a large solo exhibition.

As an artist working with such media as abstract paintings and photographs (Polaroid), Korczowski has been showing his works in the US and Europe since 1974. So far, he has staged over 120 individual exhibitions in Paris, New York, Zurich and throughout Poland.

Korczowski lives and works in Paris, France.
