= Andrzej Kowalski =

Polish painter and graphics artist

Andrzej Kowalski (1930 in Sosnowiec – 2004) was a Polish painter and graphics artist. From 1949 to 1955, he attended the Cracow Academy of Fine Arts. He became director of the studio of painting and drawing at the Academy of Fine Arts in Katowice.
