= Urszula Kolaczkowska =

Polish fine artist who specialized in hand weaving and textile arts

Urszula Kołaczkowska
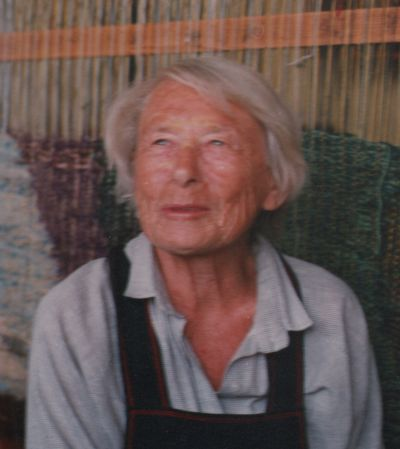
- Urszula Kołaczkowska at her studio in Zakopane
- Born: 4 October 1911; Lublin, Poland
- Died: 29 December 2009 (aged 98); Zakopane, Poland
- Known for: painting, textile arts, tapestry
- Notable work: ’’Brezhnev’s Doctrine’’; ’’Meeting in Paradise’’; ’’Sanitarium’’; ’’Room 35 – Berghof Sanitarium’’ (inspired by The Magic Mountain by Thomas Mann); ’’500 Questions about the History of Art’’

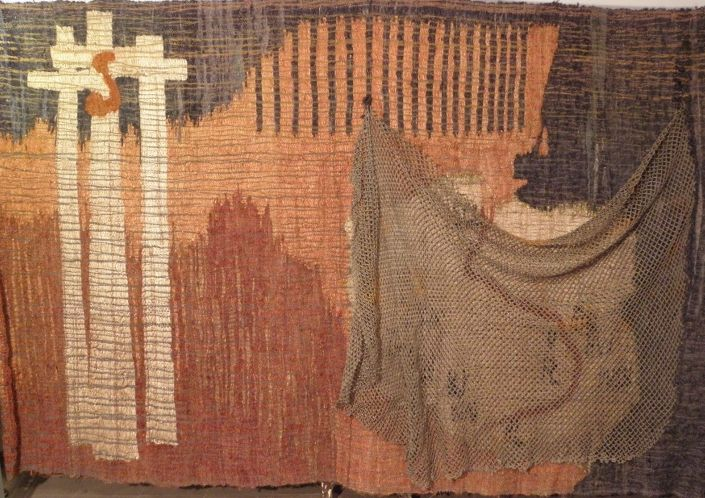
Doktryna Brezniewa („Brezhnev’s Doctrine”) 1982

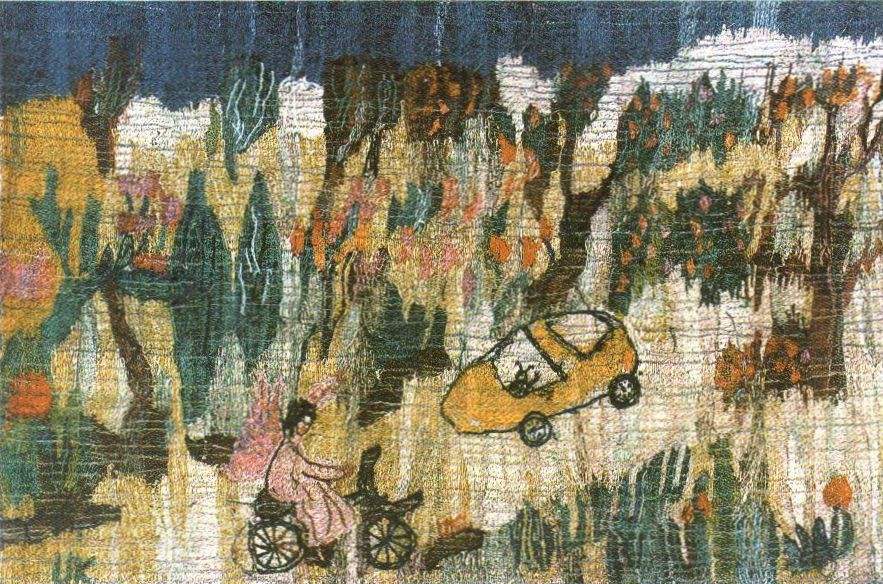
Spotkanie w raju („Meeting in paradise”) 2000

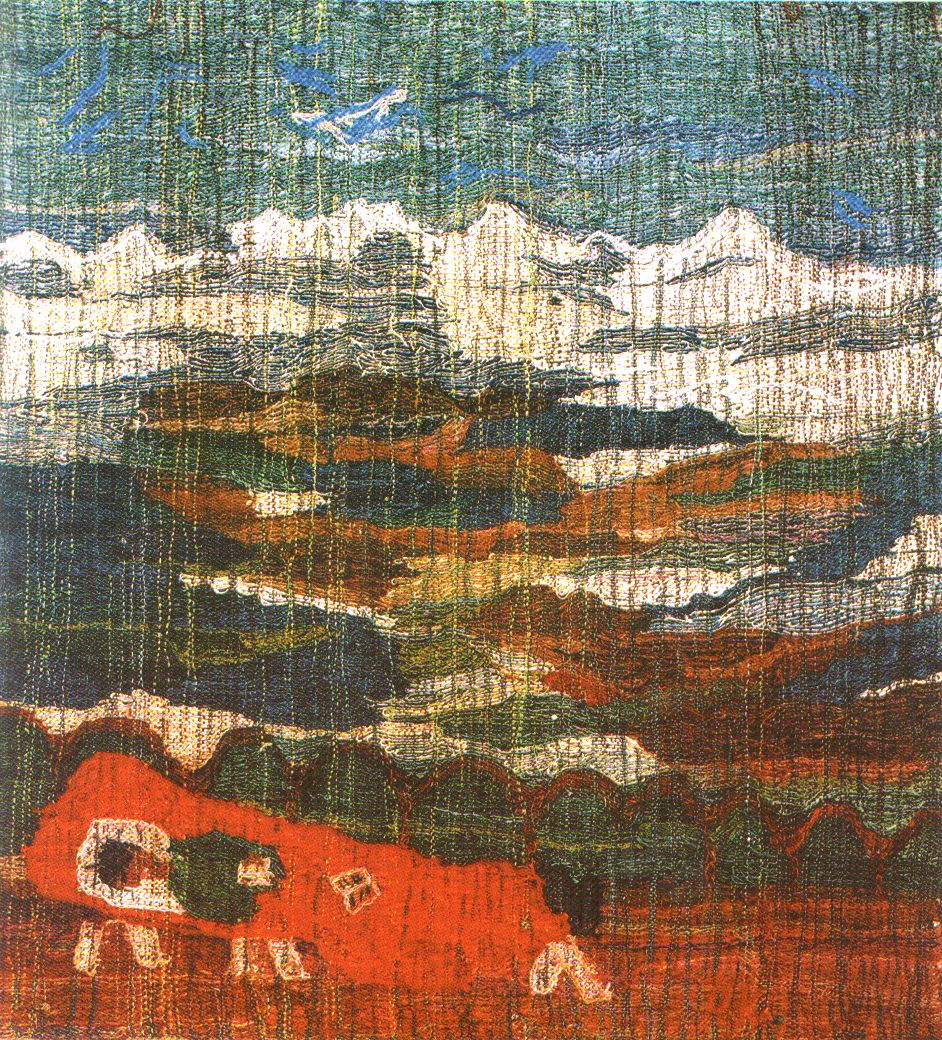
Sanatorium („Sanitarium”), 2001

Urszula Kołaczkowska (4 October 1911 - 29 December 2009) was a Polish fine artist who specialized in hand weaving and textile arts.

== Biography ==
She was the daughter of Zofia née Słonczyńska (1872–1953) and Edward Kołaczkowski (born on 18 November 1849 in Suchodoły, died on 12 August 1933 in Lublin), a landowner, citizen of Lublin city, member of the Lublin City Council and Mayor of Lublin in 1915.

In 1915, Zofia moved with her daughter to Zakopane, where she provided Urszula with her early education at home. Urszula later attended Ładysław of Gielniowo High School, a private school situated on Nowotarska St. in Zakopane, from 1924 to 1931. Between 1931 and 1937, Kołaczkowska studied history at the University of Warsaw. Her master's thesis was on “Territorial Development of Warsaw around the Lubomirski Embankment”, written under the supervision of professor Stanisław Arnold, and in October 1937, she was awarded a master's degree in history. While studying history, she started a course at the School for Journalists in Warsaw, where she earned a diploma after presenting her thesis "The French press during the Great Revolution". Between 1938 and 1939, Kołaczkowska worked as a head of the sports column at Bluszcz (Ivy), a weekly magazine for women. She spent the Second World War and the occupation in Zakopane. Between 1947 and 1948, she attended Podhale State Industrial School for Females in Zakopane, where she learned to weave. She completed her studies with a master's exam in the art of weaving and wall-hanging art in June 1948.

In 1952, Kołaczkowska was admitted to the Association of Polish Artists and Designers. In the same year she had her first exhibition at the first Country-Wide Exhibition of Interior Design and Decorative Art at the Zachęta Art Gallery in Warsaw during May, June and July. Between 1952 and 2004, her works were shown at several dozen national and international exhibitions. In 1960, Kołaczkowska had her first individual exhibition at the Tatra Museum in Zakopane.

== Artistic activity ==
Kołaczkowska was principally a hand weaver who used various material (wool, sisal, flax, hemp, nylon, steel, wood, etc.) and her own, original weaving techniques. Throughout her creative life, she introduced new forms and themes inspired by a mix of Polish and biblical influences: mountains, nature, architecture, fiction, everyday life, history and the ancient times, etc. Her art was not limited to weaving, but also extended into drawing and painting and eventually on to glass and collages. Her works were well praised and held in high esteem. She was awarded, among others, the Nowy Sącz Governor award in 1991 and the Agnieszka Stankiewicz Award in 1998.

Kołaczkowska remained active, working and creating, until old age. Her works can be found among numerous public collections (i.e. the National Museum, Warsaw, Central Museum of Textiles, Łódź, The Tatra Museum in Zakopane, Craft Museum in Krosno) as well as private ones, both in Poland and abroad. Kołaczkowska authored the book ‘500 Questions about the History of Art’ (Warsaw) issued in Polish in 1962, with several later editions. She also dabbled in writing fiction, resulting in a crime novel „Symphonic Etude” [Polish „Etiuda Symfoniczna”] written in the 1960s but published only in 2011. She returned to writing at the end of her life, leaving behind an unfinished crime novel manuscript.

Until well into her elderly age, she was a keen hiker and cross-country skier. She remained a celebrity in Zakopane, not only among the artistic circles. Short and slightly built, she was full of life and humour. The last years of Kołaczkowska's life were recorded by the photographer Anna Łodziak. In 2006, her pictures were presented in the Municipal Art Gallery in Zakopane (former Art Exhibitions Bureau Gallery). Urszula Kołaczkowska was laid to rest next to her mother in a new cemetery on Nowotarska St. in Zakopane.

== Bibliography ==
- Archiwum Uniwersytetu Warszawskiego w Warszawie, Album Studentów nr 37657.
- Urszula Kołaczkowska. ’’500 zagadek z historii sztuki’’, Ed. Wydawnictwo: Wiedza Powszechna, 1962 and later editions.
- Tadeusz Z. Epsztein. ’’Historia mojej rodziny’’, in:’’Społeczeństwo polskie XVIII i XIX wieku’’, red. J. Leskiewiczowa, t. IX, Warszawa 1991, p. 261-346.
- M. Gutowski.’’Gobeliny i rysunki Kołaczkowskiej’’, in: „Dziennik Polski” from 31.10 to 1.11.1965 r., p. 5.
- „Gazeta Wyborcza” (dodatek „Gazeta Stołeczna”) z 20–21.07.1996, s. 16.
- Urszula Kołaczkowska.’’Kuchnia i okolice: tkanina’’, exhibition catalogue at Galeria Kordegarda Warszawa, Krakowskie Przedmieście 15/17, Warszawa 2000, July–August 2000.
- „Gazeta Krakowska”, 6.04.2000, p. 5.
- G. Mróz,’’Tkane obrazy’’, in: „Tygodnik Podhalański”, 16.04.2000, p. 13.
- ’’Urszula Kołaczkowska: tkanina’’: April–May 2003 [exhibition at Centralne Muzeum Włókiennictwa], Łódź 2003.
- Urszula Kołaczkowska, ’’Etiuda symfoniczna’’, Ed. Wydawnictwo Cursor, Warszawa 2011, ISBN 8363086010
- Tadeusz Epsztein,’’Wrona Zakopiańska’’. Ed. Wydawnictwo Adam, Warszawa, 2012 ISBN 9788378210139
- J. Flach,’’Kobieta renesansu’’, in: "Tygodnik Podhalański", 6.06.2012, p. 32
- ’’Urszula Kołaczkowska - Tkanina, Tapestry’’. Municipal Art Gallery, Zakopane, 2012. ISBN 9788360246924
