= Antonio Sacchetti =

Italian painter and designer (1790–1870)

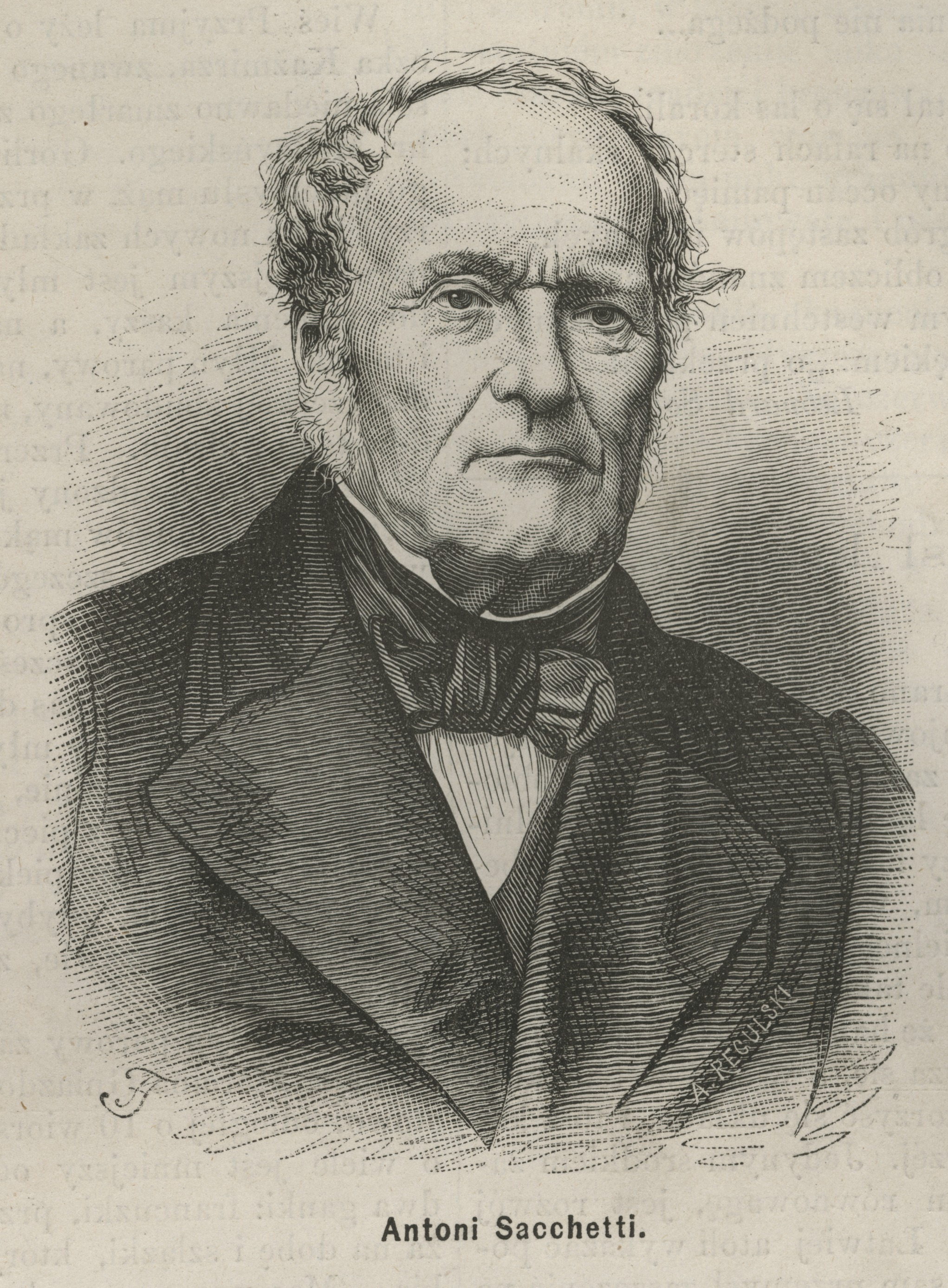
Antonio Sacchetti; woodcut by Aleksander Regulski (1870)

Antonio Sacchetti (8 January 1790, Venice – 15 April 1870, Warsaw) was a Republic of Venice-born scenic designer and painter who spent most of his career in Prague and Warsaw.

== Biography ==
He was the son of Lorenzo Sacchetti; a decorative painter, architect, and professor at the Accademia di Belle Arti di Venezia, who gave him his first art lessons.

From 1814 to 1817, he worked with his father in Brno, where they painted theatrical decorations. In 1818, they moved to Prague to work at the Estates Theatre. In 1829, when Antonio left to pursue his own career, his father remained there for another year, then went to Vienna, where he died in 1836.

Antonio chose to settle in Warsaw, where he painted backdrops for plays and operas at the Grand Theatre. He opened a "panoramic agency" at the theater, exhibiting panoramic paintings of Istanbul, Prague, Trieste, Istria, the death of Józef Poniatowski at the Battle of Leipzig, the eruption of Mount Vesuvius, and several others. During the November Uprising, he took up temporary residence in Dresden. For most of 1835, he was in Kalisz, painting a curtain and decorations for the town theatre. When he returned to Warsaw, he spent the next thirty-five years working at the Grand Theatre and its associated venues.

He also performed work in other locations, including Vienna (1833), Berlin (1834), and, in 1852, back in Prague at the Estates Theatre, where he created sets for William Tell by Rossini. His last sets (1869) were created for the premiere of Paria, an opera by Stanisław Moniuszko. Four of his works may be seen at the Moravian Gallery in Brno.

He was married to Teresa (née Rath; 1791–1869), originally from Vienna. They had no children.

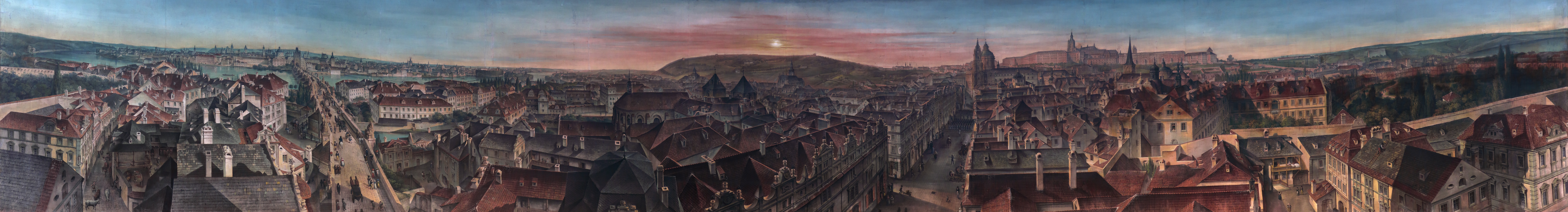
View of Prague from the Malá Strana Bridge Tower (Fifteen metres; approximately 49 ft.). Created in the early 1820s, it has been on display at the City of Prague Museum since 1895.
