= Paweł Bielec =

Polish photographer and painter

Paweł Bielec (20 March 1902 in Dynów – 16 November 2002 in Kraków) was a Polish photographer and painter.

He opened his first studio in Lviv in 1928, on Grodzka Street, and then at University street. In 1938 he moved to Krakow where he lived for many years and created the noted photographic company Photo Bielec.
