= Andrzej Dłużniewski =

Polish sculptor (1939–2012)

Andrzej Dluzniewski (3 August 1939 – 16 December 2012) was a Polish contemporary sculptor. In 2006 he received Jan Cybis Award. He died in Warsaw, Poland when he was 73 years old.

== See also ==
- Overview of Works and Style
- Biography (in Polish)
