= Chrystian Breslauer =

Polish painter and art pedagogue

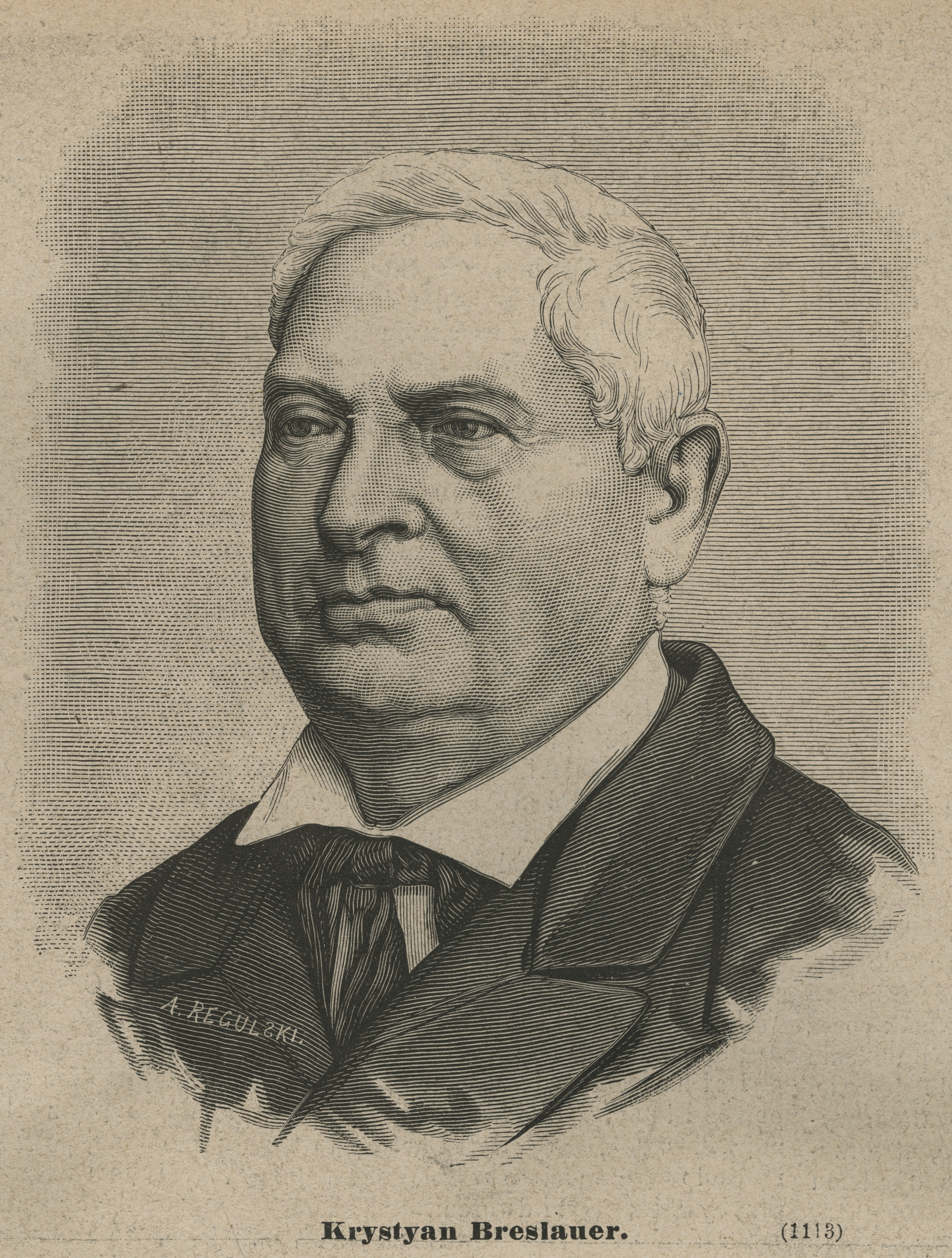
- Born: Chrystian Breslauer; 12 January 1802; Warsaw, Poland
- Died: 10 August 1882 (aged 80); Warsaw, Poland
- Known for: Painting
- Movement: Romanticism

Chrystian Breslauer (12 January 1802 – 10 August 1882) was a Polish painter and art pedagogue.

Chrystian Breslauer was born in Warsaw. He studied in Berlin and Düsseldorf, where he was taught by Johann Wilhelm Schirmer. He took numerous art travels around Germany, the Scandinavian countries, and Italy. During his art travels, he was introduced to new painting types. From 1845, he lived permanently in Warsaw. He taught at the School of Fine Arts (from 1846), and held private art classes (between 1865 and 1868).

== Selected paintings ==
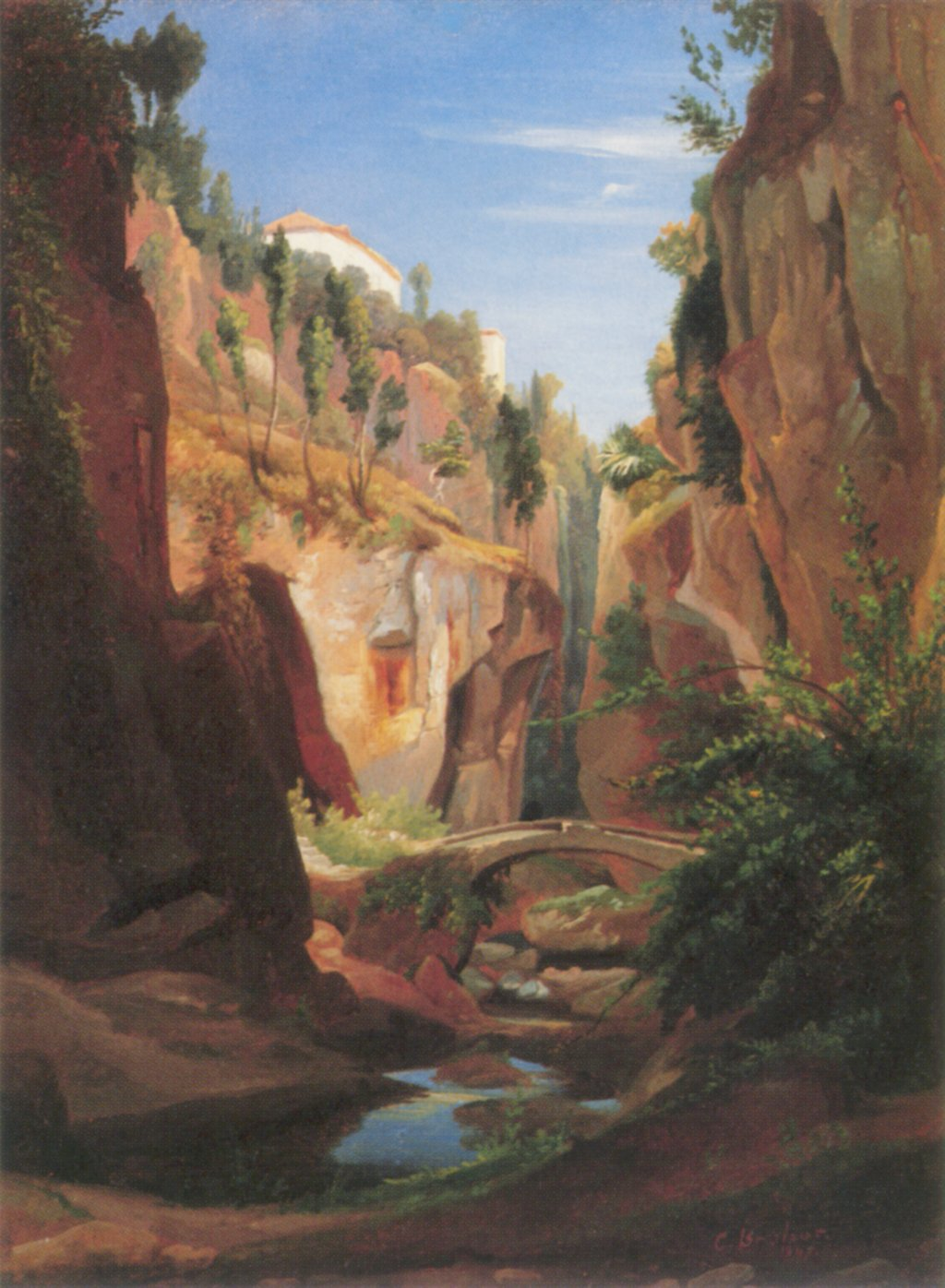
Mountain landscape
(1847)

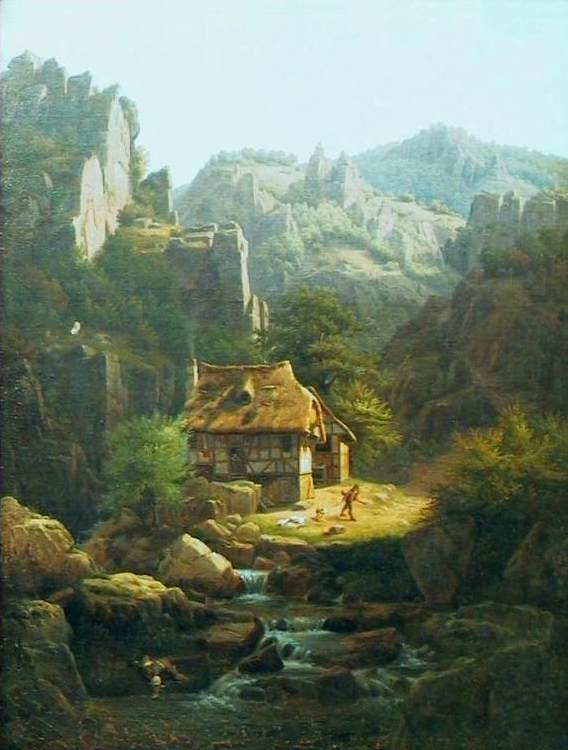
Mountain landscape
(c. 1882)

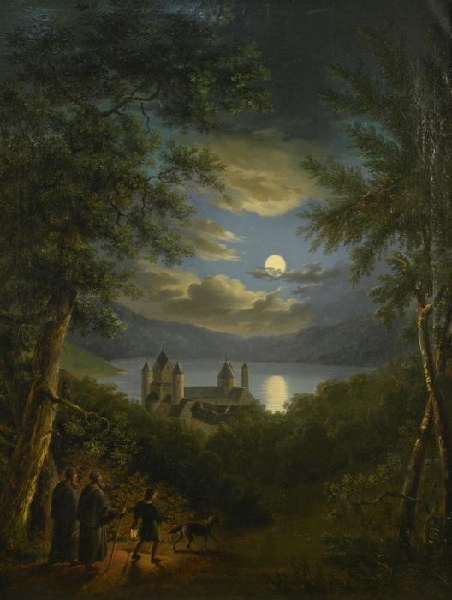
Monastery Maria Lach at the full moon
(c. 1882)
