= Krzysztof Bednarski =

Polish-Italian sculptor (born 1953)

- Born: 25 July 1953; Kraków, Poland
- Education: Jerzy Jarnuszkiewicz; Oskar N. Hansen; Academy of Fine Arts in Warsaw
- Known for: sculpture
- Notable work: Moby-Dick; Karol Marks; Victoria-Victoria
- Spouses: Barbara Kiszakiewicz; Marina Fabbri

Krzysztof Michał Bednarski (KMB) (25 July 1953 in Kraków) is a contemporary Polish-Italian sculptor.

== Life ==
He was one of three sons of Irena and Jerzy Bednarski. Before the war, his parents lived in Lwów on Kulparkowska Street. Bednarski completed the XIV High School of General Gottwald in Warsaw. Later he graduated from the Academy of Fine Arts in Warsaw (1973-1978) in the sculpture department in the studios of Jerzy Jarnuszkiewicz and Oskar Nikolai Hansen. His diploma was entitled Portret Totalny Karola Marksa (Karol Marx's Total Portrait) and was defended on July 5, 1978. He was later associated with the theater of Jerzy Grotowski, for which, during the period from 1976 to 1981, he designed posters. At that time, his first son was born and he worked at the quarry in Borów. Since 1986, he has been living in Rome, Italy. In the academic year 1996/97 and 2014-2017 he was a guest lecturer at the Academy of Fine Arts in Warsaw. In 2014, he defended his doctorate at the Academy of Fine Arts in Warsaw for his work W stronę rzeźby, czyli historia jednego dzieła bez końca (In the direction of sculpture, the story of endless work on one subject). In his early work, he criticized the communist propaganda in Portret totalny Karola Marksa (1978) (Total Portrait of Karl Marx) which is currently in the collection of the Museum of Independence in Warsaw or in Portret zbiorowy (1980) (Collective Portrait) which is currently part of the collection of the National Museum in Warsaw. He alluded to the political situation in Poland under the martial law in work such as Victoria-Victoria (1983) which is now part of the collection of the National Museum in Kraków. One of the recurring motifs in his oeuvre is Moby-Dick; its 1987 installation is currently in the ms2 collection of the Art Museum in Łódź. Bednarski acted in several movies such as Noc poślubna w biały dzień (1982) (The Wedding Night During the Daylight), Schodami w górę, schodami w dół (1988) (Walking the Steps Up and Steps Down) and he played himself in My Italy (2017). He is married to Marina Fabbri with whom he has a son, Federico. From a previous marriage with Barbara Kiszakiewicz, he has a son, Jakub.

== Posters ==
In 1976 he began to design posters for theater projects of the Jerzy Grotowski Institute in Wrocław, and in the early 1980s, also film and theater posters. An example is a 1983 poster for the film debut of Waldemar Dziki Kartka z Podróży or a poster for the play in Teatr Studio "I, Bruno Schulz" directed by Jerzy Grzegorzewski. Most of his posters are collected in Muzeum Plakatu in warsaw. Since 1980 he exhibited posters during the International Poster Biennale in Warsaw.

== Exhibitions ==
Bednarski exhibited his works in over one hundred individual exhibitions including: Gravity (dedicated to Tymoteusz Karpowicz), Galeria Awangarda, BWA, Wrocław (2016), Pamięci Ryszarda Cieślaka, Instytut J. Grotowskiego, Wrocław (2015), Pieśń z aluminium, Galeria Raster, Warszawa (2014), Widmo krąży, kurator: Achille Bonito Oliva, Narodowa Akademia Sztuk Ukrainy, Kijów (Kyiv, 2013); Egzorcyzmy, BWA, Opole (2013); Moby Dick – Opera Aperta, Państwowa Galeria Sztuki, Sopot (2013); Moby Dick – Rzeźba, Galeria aTAK, Warszawa (2012/2013); I coraz więcej bieli Galeria Foksal w Warszawie (2012); Prace z lat 1978-2008, Muzeum Narodowe we Wrocławiu; Thanatos polacco. Omaggio a Jerzy Grotowski, Museo Laboratorio d’Arte Contemporanea MLAC, Rzym (2009); Ku Górze – hommage à Jerzy Grotowski, Atlas Sztuki, Łódź (2009); Portret Totalny Karola Marksa (1977-2009), Muzeum Górnośląskie, Bytom; Moby Dick - Anima Mundi, Muzeum Narodowe w Szczecinie (2008); The Shadow Line / Brzeg cienia, Galeria Foksal Warszawa (2007) and at over five hundred group exhibitions.

== Collections ==
Bednarski's works can be found in the collections of many museums, including: the National Museum in Kraków, Poznań, Szczecin, Warsaw, Wrocław, Muzeum Sztuki in Łódź, Center for Contemporary Art Ujazdowski Castle in Warsaw, Zachęta National Gallery of Art in Warsaw, MHŻP POLIN, MOCAK in Kraków, Center of Polish Sculpture in Orońsko, Mazovian Center for Contemporary Art Elektrownia in Radom, Silesian Museum in Katowice, Museum of Independence in Warsaw, Upper Silesian Museum in Bytom, Museum of the Academy of Fine Arts in Warsaw, Studio Gallery in Warsaw, Galeria Arsenał in Bialystok, District Museum Leon Wyczółkowski in Bydgoszcz, collections of the Society for the Encouragement of Fine Arts in Lublin, Łódź and Wrocław, the Foksal Gallery collection, in Warsaw, the Poster Museum in Wilanów, PKO Bank Polski in Warsaw, the Museum of Polish History in Warsaw, and in MAAM in Rome, Foundation Giorgio Franchetti in Rome, Foundation Federico Fellini in Rimini, Foundation Morra in Naples, Foundation Orestiadi in Gibellina in Sicily, Foundation Mario Schifano in Rome, Targetti Light Art Collection in Florence, International Art Collection in Certosa di Padulla, Italy, Leube Foundation, Salzburg-Gartenau, Art Museum in Rauma, Finland, Art./Omi Foundation, New York, Kathryn & Marc LeBaron, Lincoln, US.

== Awards ==
He was awarded several scholarships from the Polish Ministry of Culture and National Heritage. In 1988/1989, he received a scholarship from the Italian government. Bednarski won the Katarzyna Kobro Award in 2004 and received an award from the EXIT quarterly magazine - Nowa sztuka in Poland (2005) and Golden Owl Award of Polonia, Vienna (2012). In December 2017, he received Premiazione del Franco Cuomo International Award (Franco Cuomo International Award) from the Italian Senate. He was decorated in Poland with Medal for Merit to Culture – Gloria Artis.

== Most important works ==
=== Karl Marx ===
Portret Karola Marksa (Portrait of Karl Marx) was Bednarski's diploma thesis, which he defended in 1978 at the Academy of Fine Arts in Warsaw. The author assembled a large photographic documentary collection and created Marx's head in many different sizes. The portrait was considered a critique of communist propaganda. Bednarski continues to create "Marxes" in various incarnations throughout his subsequent career as a total project adding objects to Marx's head or multiplying it typically as a commentary on social, political as well as his private life.

=== Signs and gestures ===
Signs is a series of monuments based on the left hand of the author. Maryla Sitkowska, a longtime critic and archivist of Bednarski's work, describes them as sculptures of the hand which makes a special gesture. For example, Ticket shows an extended hand presenting a ticket. The most famous of Bednarski's gesture is Victoria-Victoria, sculpture of victory sign with cut fingers created during the Martial law in Poland (1981-1983). One of the versions of this sculpture was created in 1983 in France during the sculpting symposium in Digne-les-Bains. The sculpture shows V sign (of victory and freedom), but with the fingers cut off. The first version of this sculpture was created in Poland couple of years before.

=== Moby-dick ===
Bednarski writes about the series of Moby-Dick works: Working on Moby Dick completely changed my thinking about sculpture and space. There has been a rapid re-evaluation of my sculptural language [...] Suddenly I felt the "freedom opening". I knew that I found the foundation of my sculpture. In 1986, he found the hull of a large boat in the snow on the Vistula river which he thought resembled the white whale from the novel of Herman Melville. The hull was cut into sixteen parts, in the act of deconstruction, and was subsequently reconstructed in the attic of the palace on Krakowskie Przedmiescie Avenue in Warsaw. Until 2014, Moby-Dick was presented in over ten museum spaces, creating, according to Bednarski: completely new relationships stimulating interactions between the object and the place. The author writes that his works from the Moby-Dick series create a long lasting passage that led him through art and life. This series of works formed the basis of his doctorate at the Academy of Fine Arts in Warsaw in 2014.

=== Portraits from shadows ===
In the summer of 1980, during the sculptural symposium Granit organized by Zagłębie Miedziowe (June 20, 1980 - August 20, 1980), Bednarski sculpted Krawężnik (A Curb) - sculpture dedicated to stonemason Jan Szeliga. The sculpture was created while working in the quarries of Gniewków and presents a schematic profile of the human head stretched over the entire length of the stone. The profile of Szliga's face is visible at the edge of the curb in the form of a shadow falling on the ground. The monument is currently exhibited in the village of Chocianów. Later, this idea of shadow projection was applied by Bednarski in the monument to Federico Fellini Incontro con Federico Fellini made in 1994.

=== Dylan Thomas (Vision and Prayer) ===
In the years 1989-1992, Bednarski developed a series of works based on the poetry of Dylan Thomas, in particular on the poem Vision and Prayer (V&P) which is written in the form of an hourglass. Bednarski created a number of relief plaques, works on paper and canvas and sculptures that transform this motif.

=== Sphinx ===
Sphinx is a sculpture made from matchboxes. The author started to build it in early May 1984 during the economic collapse in Poland. Construction of the Sphinx required acquisition of about ten thousand matchboxes. At the time this represented an enormous effort, as they were rationed. In an ironic way, the Sphinx was dedicated to great builders from the Pharaohs to Joseph Stalin. The construction of the Sphinx took three months and the artist's mother said at one point: Son, I'm afraid for you, please leave these shitty matchboxes. I talked to your brothers, they will borrow the money and buy a marble block for you so that you can carve something decent. Nevertheless, the sculpture is currently in the Polish Sculpture Center in Orońsko.

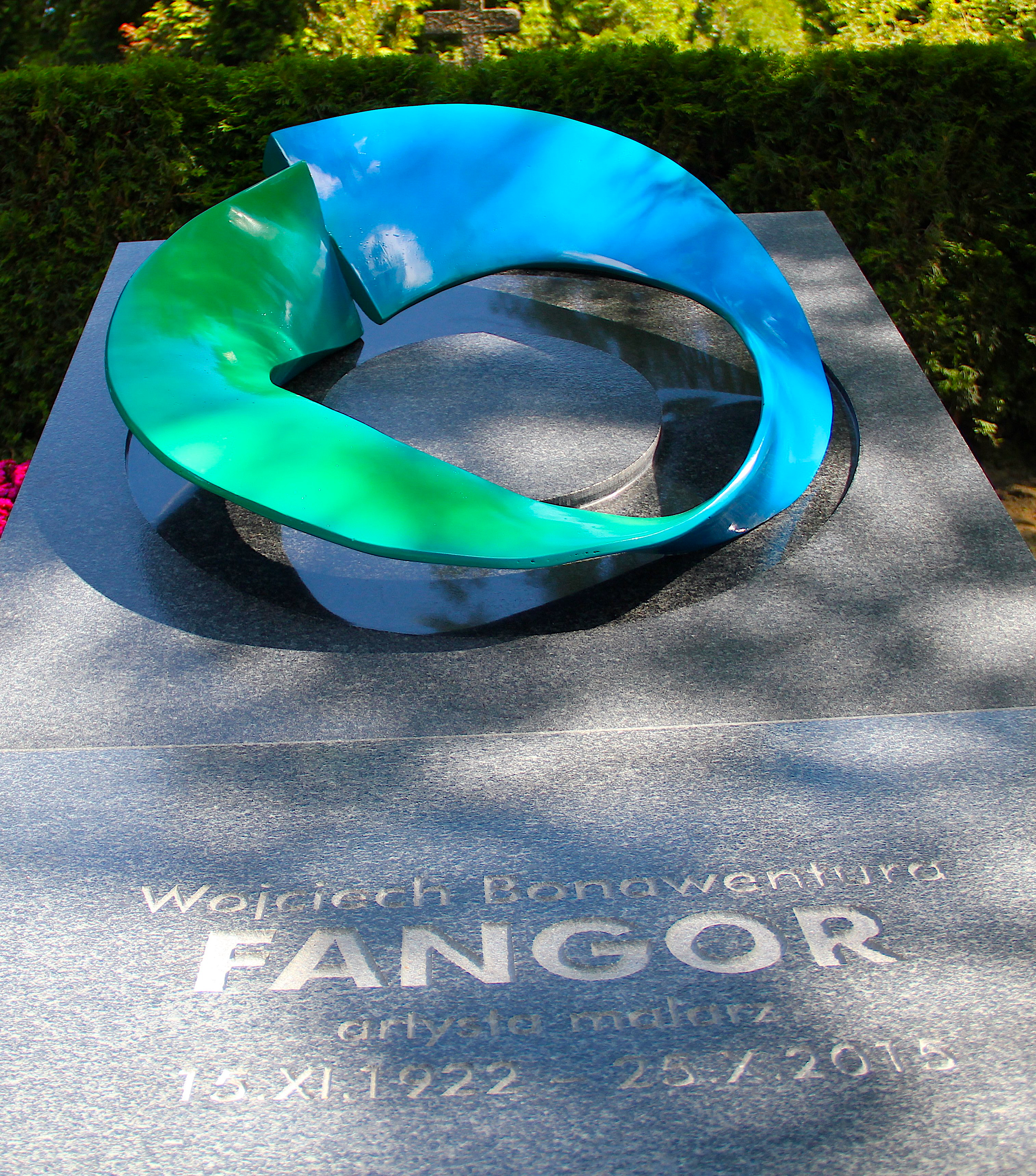
Thumbstone of Wojciech Fangor on Military Cemetery in Warsaw Powązki. 2017.

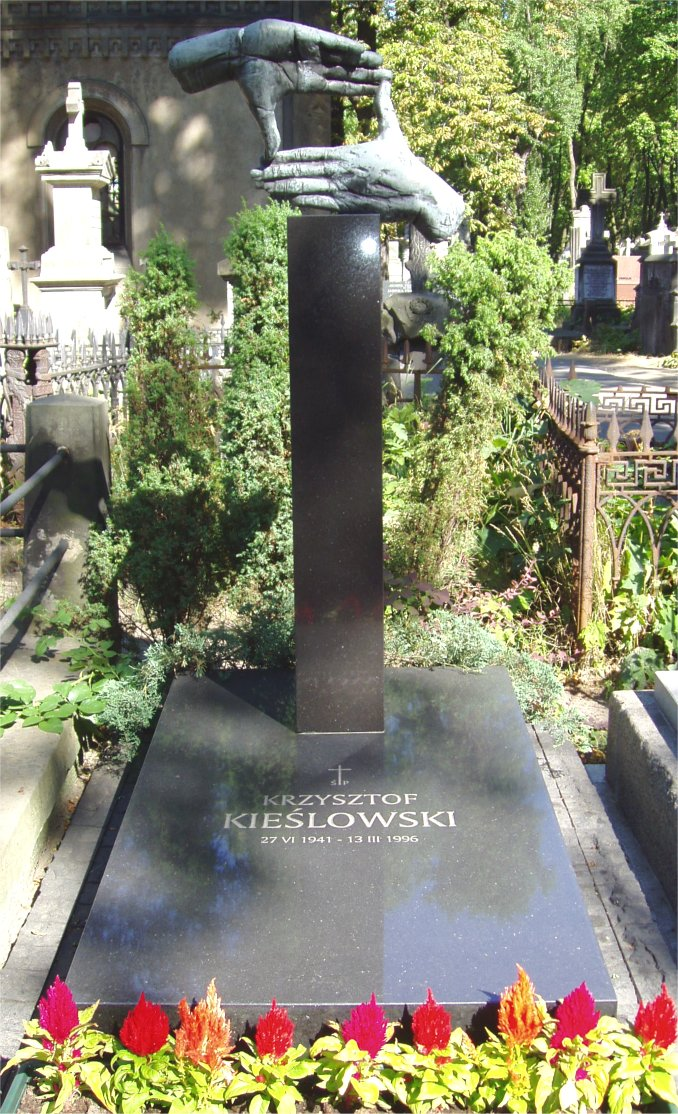
"Cropping hands" on the grave of Krzysztof Kieślowski - one of the tombstone sculptures of Krzysztof Bednarski, this one was completed in June 1997

=== Tombstones ===
He is the creator of tombstones for Konstanty Puzyna, Krzysztof Kieślowski, Ryszard Cieślak (Osobowice Cemetery, Wrocław), Wojciech Fangor (2017, Powązki Military Cemetery), Krzysztof Krauze (2017, in Kazimierz Dolny), and monuments Incontro con Federico Fellini (Rimini, 1994), Fryderyk Chopin's La note bleue (Vienna, 2010), Stefan Kuryłowicz (Warsaw 2013), and sculptures named Thanatos Polski (1984) (collection of the National Museum in Wroclaw), dedicated to the memory of friends from the Laboratory Theater of Jerzy Grotowski. In an interview in the magazine Odra, Bednarski said that the best last favor for someone who was close to him was to make him a good tombstone.
