= Center of Polish Sculpture =

Polish museum

Coordinates: 51°18′45″N 20°59′04″E

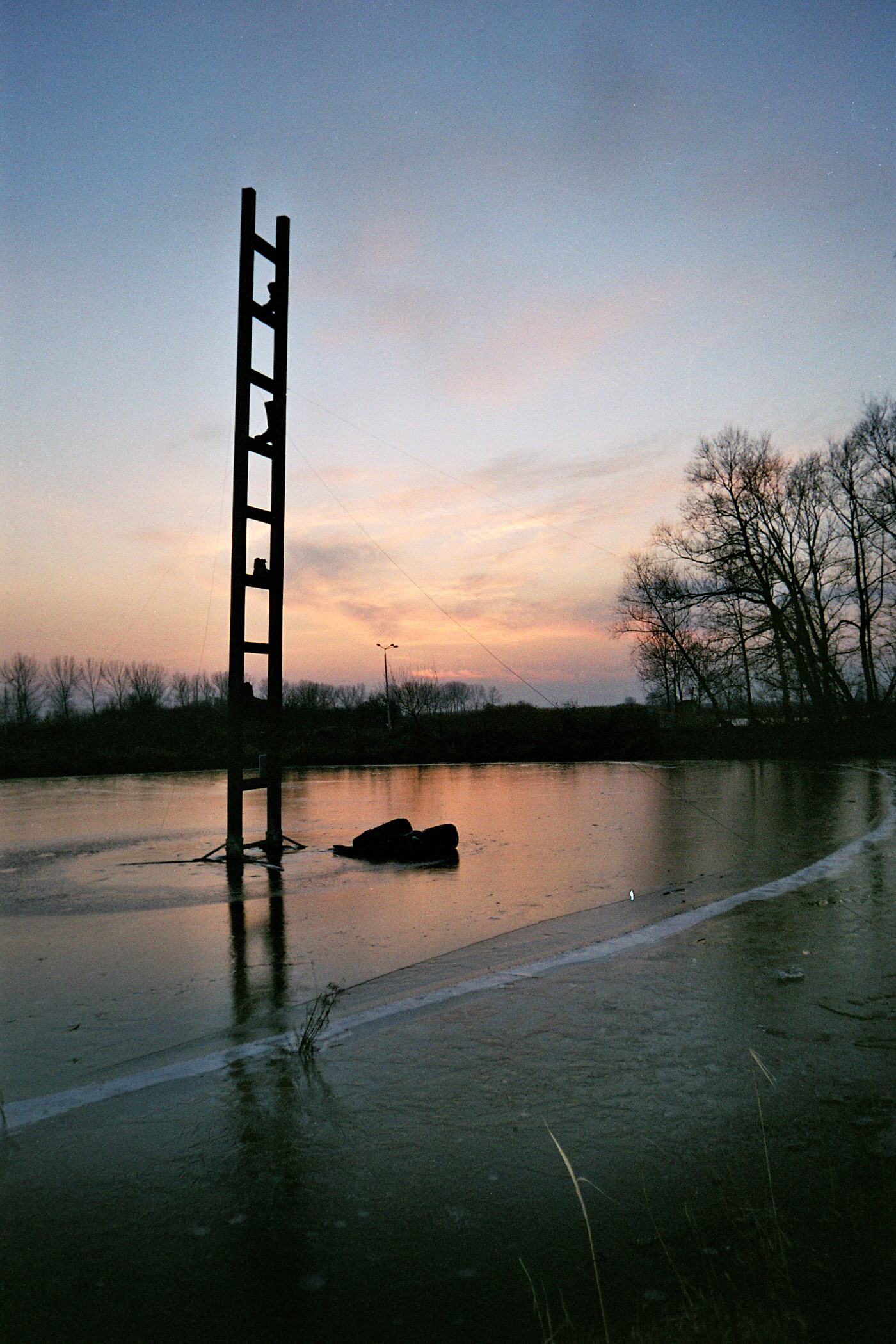
Ladder to Heaven, by Józef Szajna.

The Centre of Polish Sculpture (Polish: Centrum Rzeźby Polskiej) in Orońsko, near Radom, Poland, is a museum housed at Józef Brandt’s 19th-century manor house.

== Collection ==
The centre's collections comprise 621 sculptures, installations and other art forms owned by the centre, as well as 173 deposit items. The collections additionally include 70 paintings, drawings and tapestries. The centre's activities and the manor complex are maintained by the Joseph Brandt Foundation. The centre also provides technical support for artists who participate in its Sculpting Program.

== Józef Brandt's manor house ==
Józef Brandt's manor house was built in the second half of the 19th century in an Italian neo-Renaissance style. It accommodates a permanent exhibit of 19th-century manor interiors. The ambiance of a 19th-century country mansion is preserved in the furniture: Louis Philippe, Biedermeier and neo-Rococo pieces. Drawings and paintings by Józef Brandt, Jacek Malczewski, Juliusz Kossak, Apoloniusz Kędzierski and Alfred Schouppé, and sculptures by Pius Welloński and Feliks Georg Pffeifer, complement the exhibit.

== The manor complex ==
The manor complex also includes an orangery, chapel, annex, granary, coach-house and stables. The orangery, built 1869, once served both as a hothouse and as Brandt's atelier. Today it is a venue for temporary exhibits. Changing exhibits are held in the old manor chapel, built 1841. The annex — created from the earliest Orońsko orangery — accommodates the centre's administration and the Friends of Sculpture. The coach-house, erected by Brandt in 1905, houses a permanent sculpture gallery. Since 1995 it has showcased Magdalena Abakanowicz’s Ukon, from her cycle, War Games. Brandt's stable has been adapted into six sculpting ateliers.

== Centre of Polish Sculpture ==
The centre's sculpture garden was created in 1965. That same year, work began on establishing a Sculpting Program. The Friends of Sculpture was founded in 1969.

The year 1981 saw the establishment, with Ministry of Art and Culture support, of a state Museum and Centre of Polish Sculpture in Orońsko. Four years later, the institution was renamed the Centre of Polish Sculpture. A Museum of Contemporary Sculpture, and a sculpture garden designed by Professor Grzegorz Kowalski, were completed in 1992. In 1997, the Józef Brandt Foundation was chartered.

The Centre of Polish Sculpture's collections comprise 621 sculptures, installations and other art forms that are property of the centre, as well as 173 deposit items. The collections also include 70 drawings, paintings and tapestries. The Sculpture Garden contains 93 works by 77 artists. The centre's holdings include works by Magdalena Abakanowicz, Mirosław Bałka, Krzysztof M. Bednarski, Jan Berdyszak, Tadashi Hashimoto, Władysław Hasior, Maria Jarema, Grzegorz Klaman, Katarzyna Kobro, Zofia Kulik, Teresa Murak, Adam Myjak, Jan de Weryha-Wysoczanski and Józef Szajna.

The centre maintains a reference library on sculpture and related fields.

== The Sculpting Program ==
The centre's Sculpting Program offers the availability of 6 ateliers, a 5,200 m^{2} work yard, and technical workshops for metalworking, woodworking, ceramics, foundry-work and conservation.

== Publications ==
The centre publishes

- The annual, Polish Sculpture;
- Orońsko Seminars;
- The sculpture quarterly, Orońsko;
- Monographs on Polish sculptors;
- Thematic publications and catalogs.

== The Józef Brandt Foundation ==
The non-profit Józef Brandt Foundation was inaugurated in 1997, charged with preserving the historic Orońsko gardens and manor complex, and supporting the activities of the Centre of Polish Sculpture.
