= List of people from Suwałki =

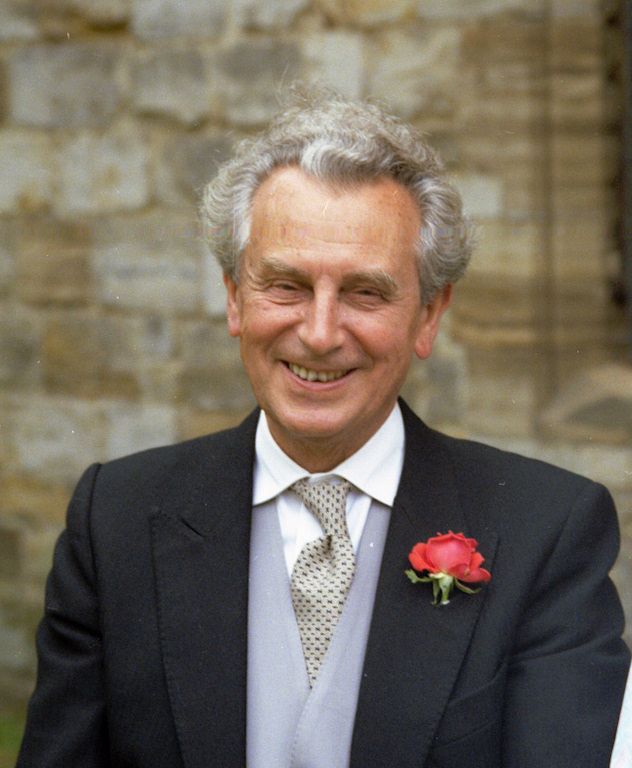
Edward Szczepanik, Prime Minister of The Government of the Polish Republic in Exile

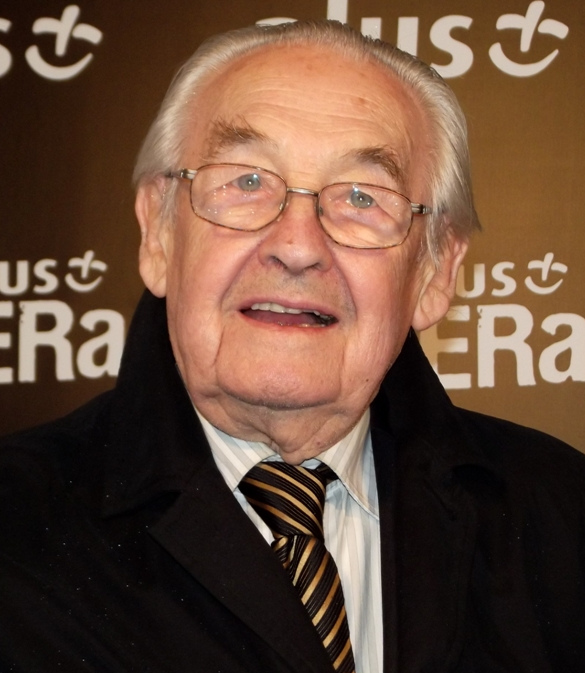
Andrzej Wajda in 2012

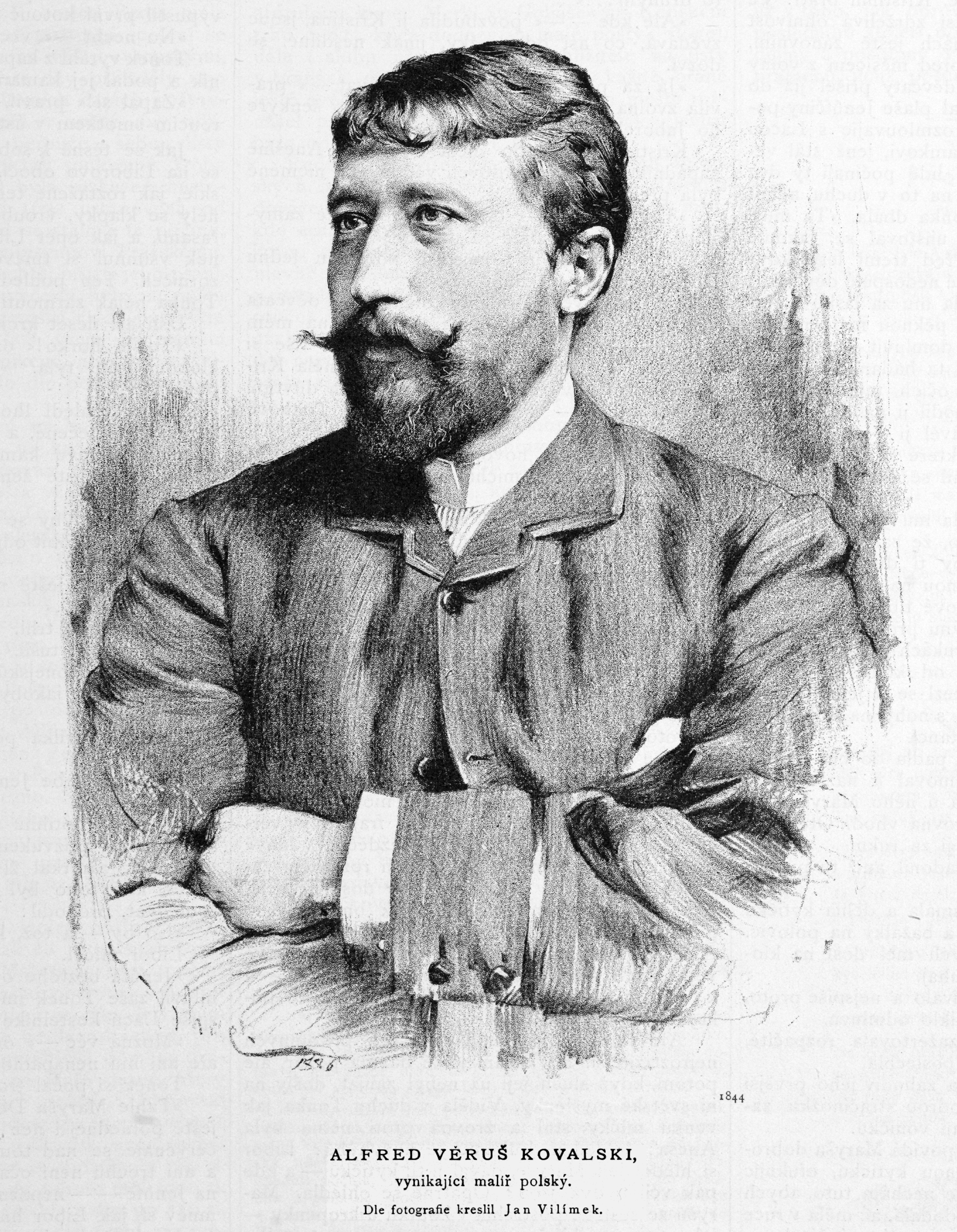
Alfred Wierusz-Kowalski

Over the centuries Suwałki has produced a number of persons who have provided unique contributions to the fields of science, language, politics, religion, sports, visual arts and performing arts. A list of recent notable persons includes, but is not limited to:

- Jacob ben Moses Bachrach (1824-1896) - noted apologist of Rabbinic Judaism
- Marian Borzęcki (1889-1942) - lawyer, politician, lawyer, Chief of the State Police
- Jerzy Dąbrowski (1889-1940) - Polish Army lieutenant colonel of cavalry, "Zagonczyk".
- Władysław Dąbrowski (1892-1927) - a major in the cavalry of the Polish Army, "Zagonczyk" partisan commander in Vilnius in 1919-1920
- Zalman Gradowski (1910–1944), secret diarist at Auschwitz-Birkenau
- Josef Hassid (1923–1950), violinist
- Edmund Kessler (1880-1930) - Colonel in the General Staff of the Army of the Russian Empire and the Polish Army
- Adam Koc (1891–1969), soldier, politician and journalist
- Maria Konopnicka (1842–1910), a poet, a novelist, a writer for children and youth, a translator, journalist and critic
- Hyman Liberman (1853-1923), first Jewish Mayor of Cape Town, serving from 1904 to 1907
- Mieczysław Mackiewicz (1880–1954), general
- Henryk Minkiewicz (1880–1940), General of the Polish Army, killed in the Katyn Massacre

a Polish socialist politician and a General of the Polish Army. Member of the Medical Faculty of the Jagiellonian University and, simultaneously, Faculty of painting at the Academy of Fine Arts. Former commander of the Border Defence Corps, he was among the Polish officers murdered in the Katyń massacre.

- Leszek Aleksander Moczulski (1938–2017) – Poet
- Marion Mushkat (1909–1995), lawyer, colonel, judge, professor/specialist of international public law, military law and international affairs
- Aleksandra Piłsudska (1882–1963), wife of Józef Piłsudski and the Polish first lady
- Zygmunt Podhorski (1891–1960), general, cavalry commander
- Aleksander Putra (1888-1962) – social and political activist, member of Parliament Legislators in the Second Polish Republic, related to Krzysztof Putra
- Zvi Yosef Resnick (1841–1912), Rosh yeshiva (Dean of a rabbinical academy)
- Samuel Rosenthal (1837 - 1902), Jewish chess master and journalist
- Pinchas Sapir (1906–1975), Israeli politician, Minister of Finance
- Avraham Stern (1907-1942) – a Jewish paramilitary leader who founded and led Lehi (the "Stern Gang")
- Edward Szczepanik (1915–2005), economist and the last Polish Prime Minister in Exile (Polish: Premierzy II Rzeczypospolitej na wychodźstwie)

As an Officer (and eventually Major) in the Polish Army, he served with distinction in the Fifth Polish Artillery Regiment - notably in the battles of Monte Cassino, Ancona, and Bologna. In 1945 he received the Cross of the Valorous, and the following year was awarded the Silver Cross of Merit with Swords. He received a PhD in Economics in 1956 from the LSE. On 7 April 1986 he was chosen the successor of Kazimierz Sabbat to be the next Prime Minister of the Second Polish Republic in-exile (Polish: Premierzy II Rzeczypospolitej na wychodźstwie). He was awarded the title of Doctor of Economic Science – Honoris Causa in 1995 by the Warsaw School of Economics.

- Andrzej Wajda (1926–2016), film director

Recipient of an honorary Oscar, he is possibly the most prominent member of the unofficial "Polish Film School" (active circa 1955 to 1963). He is known especially for a trilogy of war films: A Generation (1954), Kanał (1956) and Ashes and Diamonds (1958). Four of his movies have been nominated for the Academy Award for Best Foreign Language Film: The Promised Land (1975), The Maids of Wilko (1979), Man of Iron (1981), and Katyń (2007).

- Ruza Wenclawska (1889-1934), Polish-American suffragist and trade unionist
- Alfred Wierusz-Kowalski (1849-1915), painter of the Munich school, one of the most popular among Jozef Brandt and Władysław Czachórski
- Marcin Wojciechowski, (born 1981) presenter and journalist on Radio ZET
- Artur Bartoszewicz (born 1974), economist and candidate in the 2025 Polish presidential election
