= Józef Szajna =

Polish theatre director and sculptor (1922-2008)

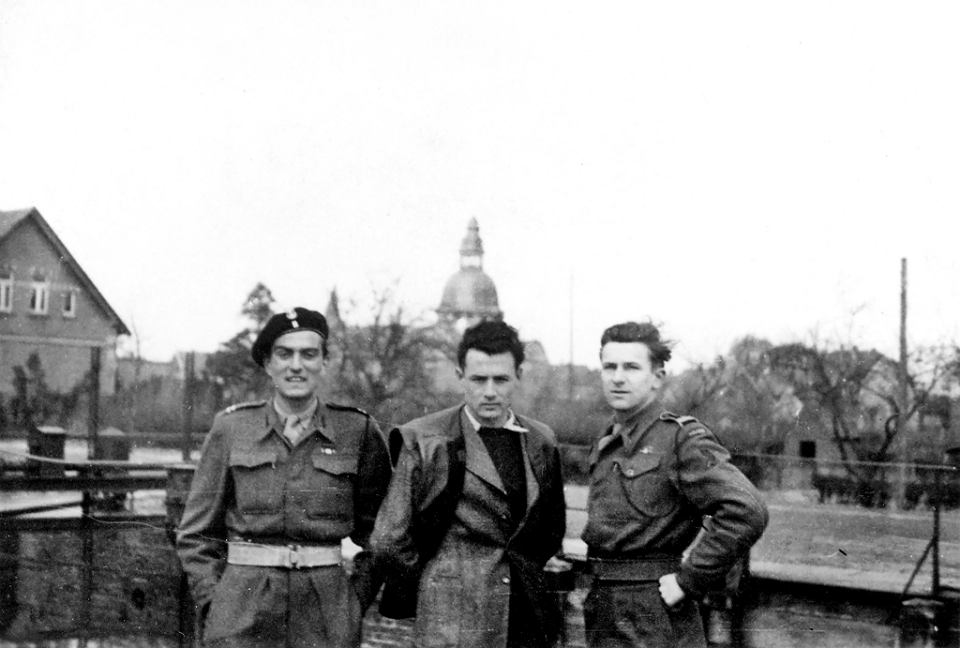
Józef Szajna (middle) in 1945

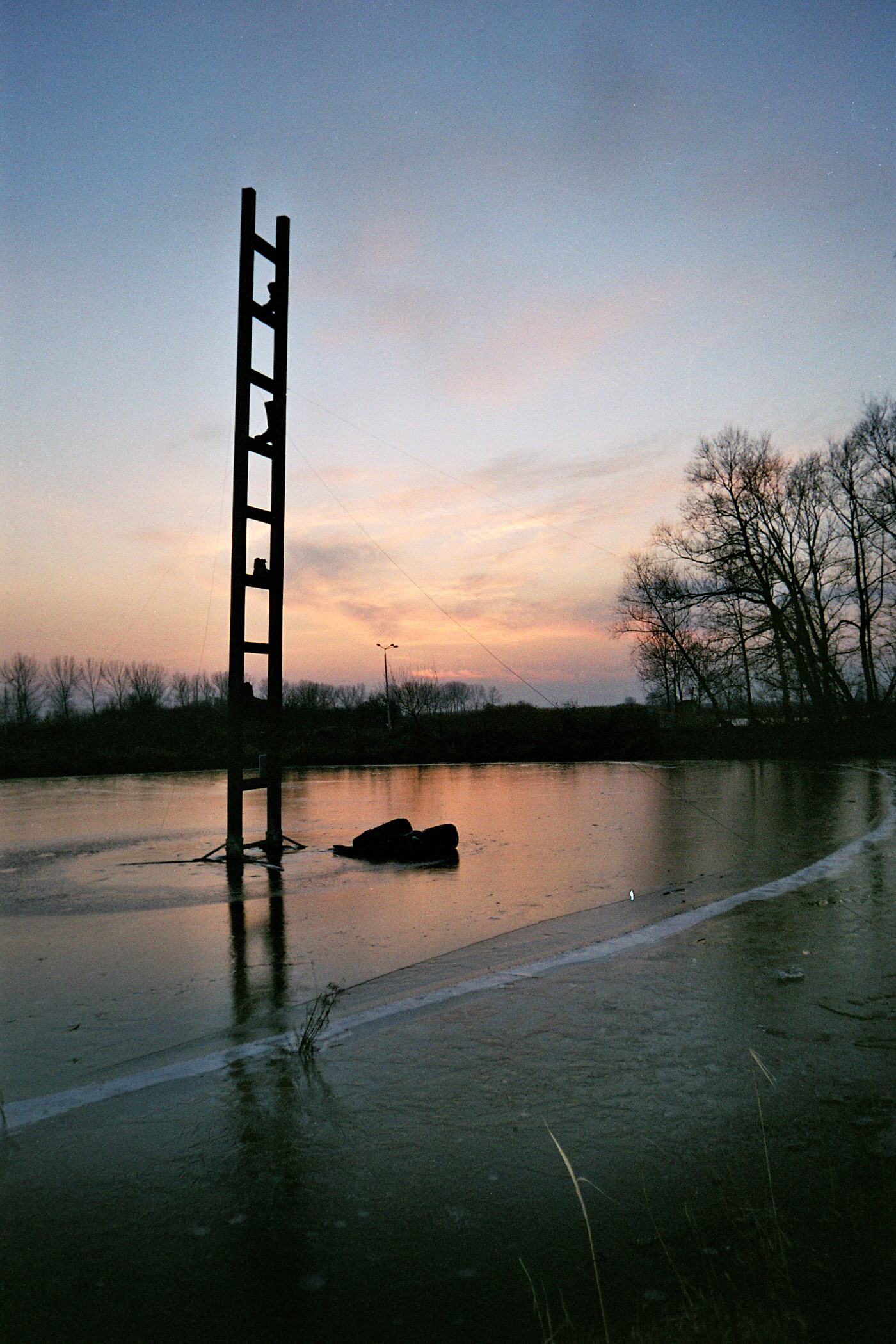
Modern sculpture "Ladders to Heaven" at the Centre of Polish Sculpture in Orońsko

Józef Szajna (Polish pronunciation: [ˈjuzɛf ˈʂajna]; 13 March 1922 in Rzeszów, Poland – 24 June 2008 in Warsaw) was a Polish set designer, director, playwright, theoretician of the theatre, painter and graphic artist.

During the Second World War and occupation of Poland, Szajna was a prisoner of the German concentration camps Auschwitz and Buchenwald.

== See also ==
- Centre of Polish Sculpture
