= Tymoteusz Karpowicz =

Polish-American poet (1921–2005)

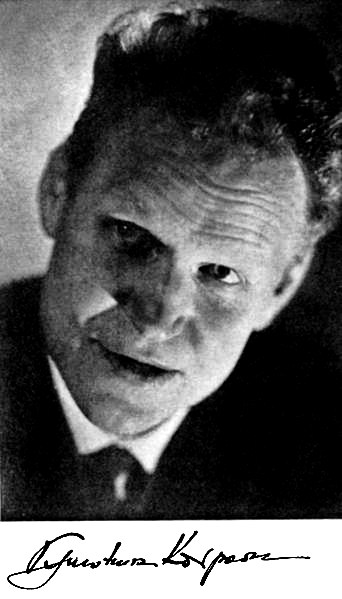
Tymoteusz Karpowicz

Tymoteusz Karpowicz (December 15, 1921 in Zielona near Vilnius – June 29, 2005 in Oak Park near Chicago) was a Polish-American language poet and playwright, writing primarily in Polish.

== Biography ==
Born in the village of Zielona, near Vilnius, Karpowicz lived there until the outbreak of World War II in 1939. Karpowicz debuted as a journalist in 1941 under the pseudonym Tadeusz Lirmian for the Vilnius-based newspaper Prawda Wileńska. During the Nazi occupation of Lithuania he was a member of the Polish Resistance. When the war came to an end in 1945, Karpowicz was resettled to Szczecin where he worked for Polish Radio. It was here Karpowicz published his first prose piece titled Legendy pomorskie ("Pomeranian Legends").

Karpowicz moved to Wrocław studied Polish philology at Wroclaw University where he received his M.A. and Ph.D. and became an assistant professor. He later received the Literary Prize of the City of Wroclaw in 1958.

=== Life after leaving Poland ===
In 1971, Karpowicz received the prestigious fellowship of the "Foundation pour une Entraide Intellectuelle Europeenne" in Paris. Two years later in 1973 he was invited to join International Working Program at the University of Iowa. In 1974, he was appointed visiting associate professor of Polish literature at the University of Illinois at Chicago, where he taught for two years. Although he has never received any official literary awards in Poland because of his stance as a political dissident, he was awarded the prestigious Alfred Jurzykowski Prize in New York City and was twice a recipient of the Illinois Arts Council Annual Award.

He spent the next two years in West Germany (1976–78) in Bonn, West Berlin, Munich, and Regensburg Universities. In 1978, he returned to the University of Illinois at Chicago Department of Slavic Languages and Literatures as a full professor.

After Lithuania declared its independence in 1990, Karpowicz wrote several articles in the Polish press encouraging the Government of Poland to recognize Lithuania.

Karpowicz retired from the now Department of Slavic and Baltic Literatures at the University of Illinois at Chicago in 1993. Karpowicz died on June 26, 2005, at his home in Oak Park, Illinois. His remains were repatriated and he was buried on August 3, 2005, along with his wife Maria in Osobowice Cemetery in Wrocław.

== Legacy ==
Contemporary Polish-Italian sculptor Krzysztof Michał Bednarski dedicated his 2016 art exhibition Gravity to Karpowicz.

It was announced in 2019 that Karpowicz's villa in Wrocław would become the future home of Nobel Laureate Olga Tokarczuk's Foundation. Aside from Tokarczuk, Agnieszka Holland and Ireneusz Grin will join her on the foundation's board of directors. The writer will allocate the 350,000 zlotys she was awarded upon winning the Nobel Prize.

== Selected works ==
- Legendy pomorskie, 1948
- Żywe wymiary, 1948
- Gorzkie źródła, 1957
- Kamienna muzyka, 1958
- Znaki równania, 1960
- W imię znaczenia, 1962
- Trudny las, 1964
- Opowiadania turystyczne, 1966
- Wiersze wybrane, 1969
- Odwrócone światło
- Poezja niemożliwa. Modele Leśmianowskiej wyobraźni, 1975
- Rozwiązywanie przestrzeni: poemat polimorficzny (fragmenty)
- Słoje zadrzewne, 1999
- Małe cienie wielkich czarnoksiężników. Zarejestrowane w paśmie cyfr od 797 do 7777, 2007

== Plays ==
- Zielone rękawice, 1960
- Człowiek z absolutnym węchem, 1964
- Dziwny pasażer, 1964
- Kiedy ktoś zapuka, 1967
- Charon od świtu do świtu
