= W krainie Gryfitów =

Western Pomeranian anthology

W krainie Gryfitów is an anthology of tales, legends and fairy tales connected with the history of Western Pomerania edited by Stanisław Świrko and illustrated by Wiesław Majchrzak. It was published for the first time in 1976.

Despite its primarily commercial character, W krainie Gryfitów is a tome useful both to the Polish folklorists, as a basis for a more scientific research into the folklore of the western part of Poland, as well as an attempt to find the Western Pomerania's Slavic roots, due to the constant disconnection and reconnection of this geographic area from the lands of Poland, since the first union of Polish tribes into one Polish nation under the Mieszko I's of Poland rule.

The anthology is filled with short stories and myths about various figures from the folks beliefs, such as Slavic deities, sirens, rusalkas, vodyanoys, spectres, vampires, strzygas and various types of animals. Some stories are also about transforming humans into animals or inanimate objects.

== Contents ==
The anthology begins with a Preface written by Stanisław Świrko. The rest of the tome consists of ten chapters of thematically arranged works:

I. W WALCE O ZIEMIĘ OJCZYSTĄ (Fighting for the Motherland)

- Marzenna Rzeszowska – O zakopanym dzwonie i dzielnych rycerzach księcia Bogusława I
- Tymoteusz Karpowicz – O bartniku Cichu i walczącym niedźwiedziu
- Czesław Piskorski i Ryszarda Wilczyńska – O włóczniach Mohortowych rycerzy
- Marzenna Rzeszowska – O obrońcach Góry Zamkowej
- Stefan Deskur – Rak
- Marzenna Rzeszowska – O żołnierzach zamienionych w drzewa
- Marzenna Rzeszowska – O śpiących rycerzach znad Odry
- Czesław Piskorski – Jak rycerz Bartłomiej z Dębogóry wypędził Brandenburczyków z Gardźca
- Stanisław Świrko – O słowiańskiej osadzie Parsęcko i Krzywym Marcinie

II. O WŁADCACH POMORZA ZACHODNIEGO (Of the Western Pomerania's rulers)

- Czesław Piskorski i Stanisław Świrko – Jak powstały Mieszkowice
- Czesław Piskorski – O Żelisławie i gnieździe gryfów
- Marzenna Rzeszowska – O księciu Barnimie II i pięknej żonie rycerza Widanty
- Marceli Labon – O księżnie Zofii i Janie z Maszewa
- Marzenna Rzeszowska – O błaźnie Mikołaju
- Marzenna Rzeszowska – O Sydonii, Białej Damie szczecińskiego zamku
- Marzenna Rzeszowska – Ostatni z rodu olbrzymów
- Marzenna Rzeszowska – O białym orle nad cmentarzem olbrzymów
- Marzenna Rzeszowska – Śmierć księcia
- Stanisław Świrko – Dąb Trzech Panów
- Tymoteusz Karpowicz – Świadectwo hańby

III. O DAWNYCH PANACH I PODDANYCH (Of the ancient Sirs and their subjects)

- Marzenna Rzeszowska – Noc sylwestrowa nad Słupią
- Czesław Piskorski – O rycerzach i okrutnym feudale
- Władysław Łęga – Księżniczka bez serca
- Marzenna Rzeszowska – Widma
- Gracjan Bojar-Fijałkowski – Upiór w Suchej
- Stanisław Pawłowicz – O trzech dębach z Osowa
- Janina Buczyńska – Przeklęty zamek na Wzgórzu Wisielców
- Janina Buczyńska – O okrutnym władcy zbójeckiego zamku
- Roman Zmorski – Dobry starosta

IV. O DAWNYCH BOGACH I BOŻKACH POGAŃSKICH TUDZIEŻ O KOŚCIOŁACH, KLASZTORACH I ZAKONNIKACH (Of the old pagan gods and idols, or else of the churches, monasteries and monks)

- Władysław Łęga – Ofiara
- Władysław Łęga – Koń wróżbita
- Gracjan Bojar-Fijałkowski – Klęska Belbuka
- Bolesław Kibała – O pogańskich dziewicach nad Drawą
- Gracjan Bojar-Fijałkowski – Wróżba Swantewita
- Stefan Deskur – Boży Dar
- Monika Wiśniewska – Zjawy topielców koło Jęczydołu
- Stanisław Świrko – O lubińskiej syrenie i zakonniku
- Janina Buczyńska – O swobnickim komturze i urodziwej córce wójtowej
- Stefan Deskur – Płomień
- Gracjan Bojar-Fijałkowski – Płaczące dzwony
- Czesław Piskorski – O diable z Kniei Bukowej
- Gracjan Bojar-Fijałkowski – Opat Bruno z Kołbacza
- Gracjan Bojar-Fijałkowski – Jesiotry braciszka Urbana
- Stanisław Pawłowicz – O kościele Mariackim w Stargardzie
- Jerzy Buczyński – O słowiańskiej bogini śmierci
- Ryszarda Wilczyńska – O dzwonach z goleniowskiej fary

V. O MORZU, JEZIORACH, RZEKACH I DZIELNYCH RYBAKACH (Of the sea, lakes, rivers and brave fishermen)

- Władysław Łęga – Król głębin
- Marzenna Rzeszowska – O rusałce z Nowogardna
- Marzenna Rzeszowska – O regalickim wodniku
- Stanisław Rzeszowski – O pięciogłowym smoku
- Tymoteusz Karpowicz – O dąbskiej syrenie
- Tymoteusz Karpowicz – O rybaku i diable
- Jerzy Buczyński – O rzece Inie
- Gracjan Bojar-Fijałkowski – Diabeł powsinoga
- Marzenna Rzeszowska – O złośliwym diable i sprytnym rybaku
- Janina Sidorowicz – O rycerzu Warszu i Warszewskim Jeziorze
- Stanisław Świrko – Syrena z Trzęsacza

VI. O MIŁOŚCI RYCERSKIEJ I WIEŚNIACZEJ (Of the knights' love and peasants' love)

- Gracjan Bojar-Fijałkowski – Pieśń Świętobora
- Gracjan Bojar-Fijałkowski – O zaczarowanej księżniczce Sygrydzie
- Tymoteusz Karpowicz – Siedem wierzb
- Gracjan Bojar-Fijałkowski – O dwóch braciach rycerzach i ich niesławnej śmierci
- Stefan Deskur – Bliźniaki
- Janina Buczyńska – O kupcównie Małgosi i szadzkim kasztelanie
- Marzenna Rzeszowska – O kochankach z Trzęsacza
- Marzenna Rzeszowska – O niezgodnych rycerzach
- Stanisław Świrko – O szewczyku i pięknej starościance

VII. O GRODACH POMORSKICH I ICH MIESZKAŃCACH (Of Pomeranian Gords and their inhabitants)

- Stanisław Świrko – O zatopionej Winecie
- Jerzy Buczyński – Ślepy rumak z Winety
- Marzenna Rzeszowska – O zdrajcy burmistrzu i pasterce Anusi
- Marzenna Rzeszowska – Tajemnica herbu Goleniowa
- Czesław Piskorski – Wieniec Zgody
- Gracjan Bojar-Fijałkowski – Zaraza w Połczynie
- Stanisław Świrko – Kłopoty mieszkańców Sianowa
- Jerzy Buczyński i Stanisław Świrko – Skąd pochodzi nazwa miasta Kamień
- Jerzy Buczyński – O Morzu Czerwonym w Stargardzie
- Jerzy Buczyński – Baszta Kaszana w Trzebiatowie
- Stanisław Świrko – Skarby zamku drahimskiego
- Stanisław Świrko – Ambona w Radaczu
- Marceli Labon – O widmie na Grodźcu

VIII. O ZBÓJCACH I PIRATACH (Of robbers and pirates)

- Gracjan Bojar-Fijałkowski – O zbójcach z Góry Chełmskiej i mosiężnym rogu
- Monika Wiśniewska – O głazie Kołyską zwanym
- Stanisław Deskur – Rozbójnik
- Gracjan Bojar-Fijałkowski – Strachy nad jeziorem Glicko
- Tymoteusz Karpowicz – Czarny Lewiatan
- Władysław Łęga – Okręt widmo
- Tymoteusz Karpowicz – Siedmiu łebian w niebie
- Stanisław Świrko – O urodziwej Stence * korsarce wolińskiej

IX. O ZACZAROWANYCH SKARBACH, SZCZĘŚCIU I LUDZKIEJ CHCIWOŚCI (Of the enchanted riches, happiness and human greed)

- Gracjan Bojar-Fijałkowski – O ubogim gospodarzu i bursztynowych skarbach
- Janina Buczyńska – Ubogi bednarz z Kołbacza, który osadę Sowno założył
- Gracjan Bojar-Fijałkowski – Kamień szczęścia
- Gracjan Bojar-Fijałkowski – Skarby podziemnego zamku
- Stanisław Rzeszowski – Skarb rycerza o sześciu palcach
- Stanisław Rzeszowski – O skamieniałym chciwcu z Karska
- Marzenna Rzeszowska – O strażnikach skarbu i pracowitym szewczyku
- Władysław Łęga – Dzwon
- Tymoteusz Karpowicz – Złote Jezioro
- Tymoteusz Karpowicz – Ślepiec z Łeknicy
- Stanisław Świrko – Szczęście na moście
- Marzenna Rzeszowska – O skarbie i szubienicy na Serbskiej Górze

X. BAŚNIE O KARZEŁKACH, DIABŁACH, CZAROWNICACH I STRACHACH (Fairy tales about midgets, devils, witches and things that go bump in the night)

- Gracjan Bojar-Fijałkowski – O dobrych karzełkach znad brzegów Jamna
- Władysław Łęga – Niezwykłe wesele
- Gracjan Bojar-Fijałkowski – O dwóch białych gołąbkach
- Gracjan Bojar-Fijałkowski – Lestek na królewskim dworze
- Gracjan Bojar-Fijałkowski – Tajemnica czarnej wody
- Gracjan Bojar-Fijałkowski – Nocna przygoda drwala Marcina
- Gracjan Bojar-Fijałkowski – Śpiewający przetak
- Gracjan Bojar-Fijałkowski – O dwóch siostrach gęsiareczkach
- Gracjan Bojar-Fijałkowski – Odmieniec
- Gracjan Bojar-Fijałkowski – Pas wilkołaka
- Gracjan Bojar-Fijałkowski – Kamienna chatka
- Gracjan Bojar-Fijałkowski – Jak rycerz Bonin diabłu duszę zaprzedał
- Stefan Deskur – Sześć sióstr
- Gracjan Bojar-Fijałkowski – Człowiek w kamień zaklęty
- Gracjan Bojar-Fijałkowski – Olbrzym, diabeł i przemyślny karzełek
- Gracjan Bojar-Fijałkowski – O złych wróżkach i cudownym źródełku
- Monika Wiśniewska – Sabat czarownic na górze Słup
- Władysław Łęga – O zamku w Sławnie
- Gracjan Bojar-Fijałkowski – Fałszywa kartka
- Gracjan Bojar-Fijałkowski – Księga tajemnej wiedzy
- Stanisław Rzeszowski – O błędnym ogniku

W krainie Gryfitów ends with Dictionary of old Polish words, Polish dialects, and foreign words and Sources. The table of contents, found at the very end of the tome, is entitled Spis Rzeczy, which translates roughly as “The list of things”.
