= Society for the Encouragement of Fine Arts =

Society for the Encouragement of Fine Arts can refer to:

- the Society for the Encouragement of Fine Arts, a predecessor of the University of Cumbria
- the Society for the Encouragement of Fine Arts in Warsaw, a Polish arts organization in Warsaw
