= Marion Mushkat =

Polish lawyer, colonel and military judge

Marian Muszkat מריון מושקט
- Born: 5 November 1909; Suwałki, Russian Empire
- Died: 23 March 1976 (aged 80); Haifa, Israel
- Military career
- Allegiance: Polish People's Republic; Israel
- Branch: Polish People's Army
- Service years: 1943-1946
- Rank: Pułkownik (Colonel)
- Units: 2nd Tank Regiment; Supreme Military Court
- Commands: Vice President of the Supreme Military Court
- Conflicts: Second World War
- Awards
- Other work: lawyer, specialist in international law

Marion Mushkat or Marian Muszkat (November 5, 1909 – September 30, 1995), was a Polish lawyer, colonel in the Polish Army formed in the Soviet Union, and military judge in Stalinist Poland specialising in international public law, military law and international affairs. He immigrated to Israel at the end of Stalinist period in postwar Poland, where he became a professor at Tel Aviv University. He died in Haifa.

== Biography ==
=== Early life ===
Marian Muszkat was born in Suwałki (Poland under partitions), where he completed primary and then secondary school. In 1927 he began studies at the University of Warsaw. In Warsaw Muszkat studied law, and simultaneously worked as a clerk in factories and as a school teacher. As a student he belonged to socialist academic organizations. Muszkat was a distinctive student, thereby he soon travelled to France to continue his studies at the University of Nancy. During his stay in Nancy, Muszkat penned some new ideas about public international law, peremptory norm and international problems concerning the Third World countries. In 1931 Muszkat obtained a degree of Master of Law, and in 1936 at the same university he received a degree of Doctor of Law.

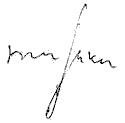
Muszkat's signature

=== During World War II ===
During World War II, Muszkat relocated to Vilnius first, where worked in Prawda Wileńska, and lectured at the Vilnius University. In June 1941 he evacuated to the Soviet Union. In 1941–1943 he was a clerk in a kolkhoz and a teacher in the Gzy–Orda Pedagogic Institute. In May 1943 Muszkat joined the People's Army of Poland (Ludowe Wojsko Polskie). Having completed officers course, he served as lieutenant in the Polish 1st Tadeusz Kościuszko Infantry Division. In October 1943 he became a military judge of the Martial Court at Polish First Army. In 1945 he was promoted to a judge of Supreme Court Martial. In the Court, Muszkat was a vice-chairman and chief of the War Crimes Commission. After his return to Poland with the Soviet westward offensive in 1945, he became a member of Polish Workers' Party (PPR). On 5 December 1946 Muszkat was demobilized from the army as a colonel.

=== The Polish People's Republic ===
After the war he began his work in the Stalinist Ministry of Justice as deputy in the Polish Highest Military Court (Najwyższy Sąd Wojskowy, NSW), investigating German war crimes. Muszkat was a specialist in the field of international public law, therefore the Ministry of Justice dispatched him to Nuremberg, as chairperson of the Polish delegation. At the Nuremberg Trials Mushkat directed the Polish delegation which also included Prof Tadeusz Cyprian and prosecutors: Prof Jerzy Sawicki and Dr Stanisław Piotrowski. They prepared the “Polish indictment” containing the list of proven Nazi war crimes committed in Polish territory.

Having returned to Poland he began scientific and didactic activity. At the University of Warsaw he lectured on military law and international public law in the Department of International Public and Private Law, directed by prof Cezary Berezowski. He also lectured at the Central Law School, General Headquarters Academy and Polish International Affairs Institute (from 1950-1951 as its director). In 1950, for his dissertation in the Stalinist International criminal law, new domain development, he was awarded a professorship. He was co-founder and editor Law and Life magazine.

Muszkat wrote from the pro-Soviet point of view. He propagated communist ideals, especially those of his mentor Andriej Wyszynski. Amongst Polish scientists, Muszkat has some opponents. For instance prof. Stefan Korboński wrote later that "Muszkat's views transformed the courts into a political institution, with prosecutors as masters of life and death of absolutely everyone (...) and barristers, as communist police helpers."

=== Israel ===
In 1957, following the anti-Stalinist Polish October revolution Muszkat left Poland, and settled in Israel. At Tel Aviv University, he lectured on international public law and international affairs. In 1961, Yad Vashem Institute designated him as co-ordinator and adviser to the Adolf Eichmann trial. Muszkat, at the request of Israel's government, was a consultant in many strategic matters undertook by this country. Professor Muszkat became a member of many international institutes, organizations, and associations, for example: the International Peace Institute, the World Academy of Art and Science, American Academy of Political and Social Science, International Bar Association, World Federalist Movement, Institut Français de Polémologie, and the National Institute of Justice.

He participated in many congresses and symposiums in the whole world to field political research, peace research and futurology. Muszkat is author of many publications edited in: Polish, English, French, Hebrew, German, Russian, Czech, Hungarian and Chinese, too. He wrote the first Polish modern textbook on international public law, Outline of the International Public Law Muszkat M. (edit.), Warsaw 1955 (two volumes). He died September 30, 1995, in Haifa.

== Awards and decorations ==
- Order of the Cross of Grunwald, 3rd Class (1945)
- Knight's Cross of the Order of Polonia Restituta (1945)
- Bronze Medal "For Merit on the Field of Glory" (1943)
- Medal of the 10th Anniversary of People's Poland (19 January 1955)
- Medal "For Courage" (USSR, 1943)

== Selected publications ==
- Polish Charges against German War Criminals submitted to the UN War Crimes Commission, Warsaw 1948;
- The Protection of Human Rights, Warsaw 1948;
- Some Problems of Israel's Development: An Outline, Hamburg 1971;
- The Evolution of the Situation in Poland in 1980, Koln 1981;
- The Third World and Peace: Some Aspects of the Interrelationship of Underdevelopment and International Security, New York-Hampshire 1982;
- Philo-Semitic and Anti-Jews Attitudes in Post-Holocaust Poland, Lewiston-Queenstown-Lampeter 1992.

== See also ==
- Commission for the Examination of German Crimes in Poland (Institute of National Remembrance)
- Supreme National Tribunal
- Philo-Semitism
