= Agata Kowalska-Szubert =

Polish scholar

- Born: 4 February 1968
- Died: 27 May 2025 (aged 57)
- Burial place: Osobowice Cemetery
- Education: University of Wrocław

Agata Joanna Kowalska-Szubert (4 February 1968 – 27 May 2025) was a Polish scholar, habilitated doctor of Dutch linguistics at the University of Wrocław.

== Biography ==
In 1991, she graduated in Germanic Philology with a specialization in Dutch Studies from the University of Wrocław and became professionally associated with the Department of Dutch Philology. On 13 June 1996, based on the dissertation "De kool en de geit. Nederlandse vaste verbindingen met een dier- of plantelement," she defended her doctoral thesis at the Rijksuniversiteit at Leiden University in the Netherlands, obtaining a PhD in Dutch linguistics. She obtained her habilitation on 26 October 2016 at Palacký University Olomouc. Since 2016, she has been the head of the Department of Dutch Linguistics and deputy head for teaching and student affairs at the Erasmus of Rotterdam Department of Dutch Philology.

She was the president of the Comenius Association of Central European Dutch Speakers and vice-president of the International Association of Dutch Speakers (Internationale Vereniging voor Neerlandistiek).

Since 1993, she was a translator of Dutch and German and a practicing translator.

Kowalska-Szubert was buried on 7 June 2025 at the Osobowice Cemetery in Wrocław.
