= Apoloniusz Kędzierski =

Polish painter, illustrator and decorator

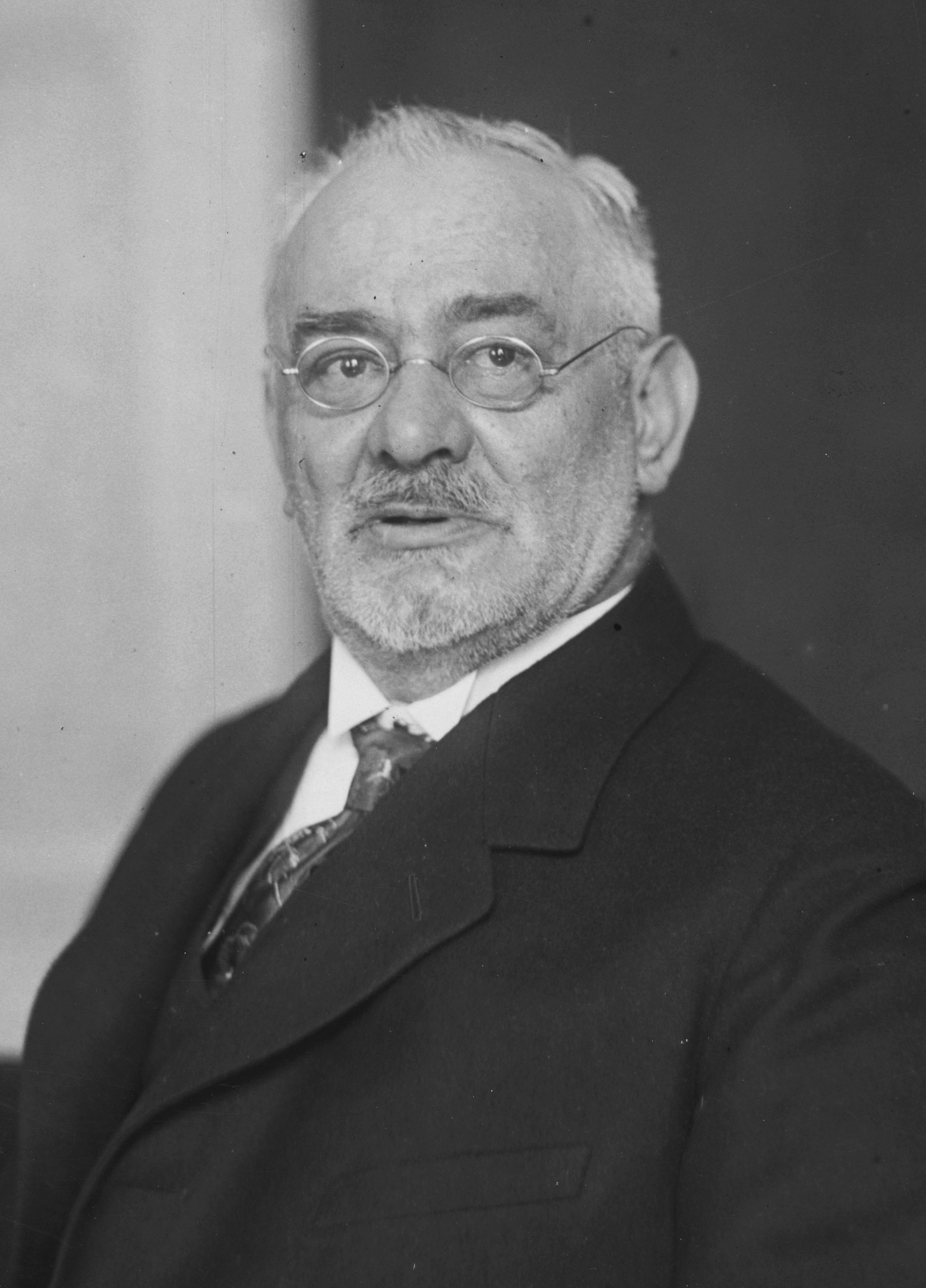
Apoloniusz Kędzierski (1938)

Apoloniusz Kędzierski (1 July 1861 – 21 September 1939) was a Polish painter, illustrator and decorator, known for landscapes and scenes of peasant life.

== Biography ==
He was born in Suchedniów. He attended the public schools in Radom, then took art lessons from Józef Brandt. Later, he studied with Wojciech Gerson. From 1885 to 1888, he was at the Academy of Fine Arts, Munich, where he studied with Nikolaos Gyzis. He had a brief stay at the Academy in Vienna in 1886. After studying, he settled in Warsaw.

In addition to his paintings, he designed furniture and ceramics and provided illustrations for several magazines as well as The Peasants by Władysław Reymont (Geberthner & Wolf, 1928).

He was named an officer in the Order of Polonia Restituta in 1923. Just before his death, he became a member of TOW. He died (from natural causes) in 1939 in Warsaw. Many of his works were lost when his former studio burned down during the early days of the Warsaw Uprising.
