= Society for the Encouragement of Fine Arts (Warsaw) =

Arts organization in Warsaw, Poland

Coordinates: 52.239°N 21.011°E

- Towarzystwo Zachęty Sztuk Pięknych
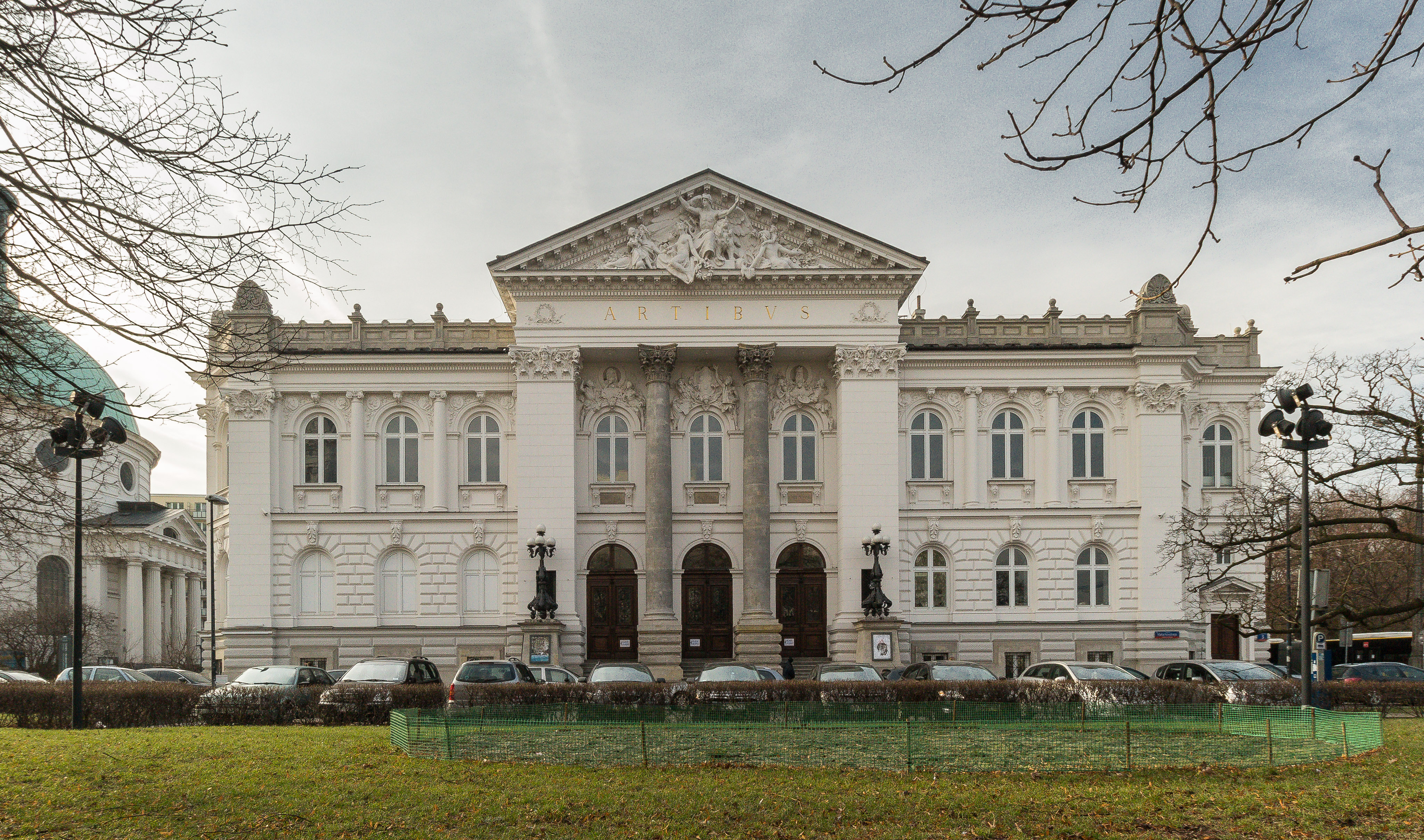
- Headquarters of the organization from 1900 and 1942 (currently the Zachęta National Gallery of Art)
- Formation: 1860
- Location: Warsaw, Poland
- Fields: Fine arts

The Society for the Encouragement of Fine Arts (Polish: Towarzystwo Zachęty Sztuk Pięknych) was an independent arts organization founded in Warsaw, then Kingdom of Poland, in 1860. Its main goal was to support and popularize Polish art through active acquisitions, providing help for young artists through scholarships, as well as publishing and organizing exhibitions and art competitions, among other activities.

The society remained active until the Nazi invasion of Poland in 1939 and was officially shut down in 1942. The former building of the Society for the Encouragement of Fine Arts in Małachowski Square in Warsaw currently houses the Zacheta National Gallery of Art, a state-funded museum dedicated to Central and Eastern European modern and contemporary art.

== History ==
=== Kingdom of Poland (1860-1918) ===
The repression that resulted from the November Uprising, made higher artistic education virtually impossible. The last major exhibition took place in 1845. After protests by artists during the 1850s, the Wystawa Krajowa Sztuk Pięknych (National Exhibition of Fine Arts) was approved in 1858, and led to negotiations with Russian rulers who in the end permitted the foundation of the Society for the Encouragement of Fine Arts in 1860. On 13 December 1860, the first meeting of the founding members was held. The board had twelve members, six artists and six art experts, and was elected annually. The members remained in office for at least one month but no longer than one year.

The inaugural Committee of the Society included: Edward Rastawiecki, Justinian Karnicki, Stanisław Zamoyski, Leon Dembowski, Józef Ignacy Kraszewski, Aleksander Przeździecki; artists: Alfred Schouppe, Józef Simmler, January Suchodolski, Rafał Hadziewicz, Juliusz Kossak, and Konstanty Hegel. The following were elected to the Accounting Committee: Jakub Lewiński, Karol Beyer and Aleksander Lesser. On behalf of the Administrative Council of the Kingdom of Poland, the Act of the Society was approved by the secretary of state, Justynian Karnicki who later would become a longtime vice-president of the Society (1862–1876) and a member of the Society's Committee. The Society was initially located at Hotel Europejski before moving to Resursa Obywatelska Palace in 1896.

=== New building (1900) ===
After the Society was given land by the municipality close to the Saxon Palace in Warsaw, another competition was announced in 1894, won by the Warsaw architect, Stefan Szyller. He presented an architectural design in neo-Renaissance style with classical elements. The portal is ornamented with allegorical figures and sculptural works by Zygmunt Otto. The architrave of the building is engraved with the Latin word "Artibus" (English: arts). Construction work began in 1898. In December 1900, the newly designed building became the official location of the Society, commonly known as Zachęta (Encouragement). The building included large exhibition spaces and a dedicated library. It was followed by the opening of the south wing in 1903.

=== Modern era (1918-present) ===
On 16 December 1922, President of Poland Gabriel Narutowicz was assassinated at Zachęta while viewing an exhibition dedicated to modern Polish painting, only five days after taking office. Following the Nazi invasion of Poland in September 1939 and the outbreak of World War II, Zachęta was shut down and the building used for German Nazi propaganda under the name Haus der deutschen Kultur (House of German Culture). It reopened in 1949 as the Central Bureau of Art Exhibitions (Centralne Biuro Wystaw Artystycznych or CBWA), becoming an official arm of cultural propaganda of the nascent Stalinist regime. In 1989, as Communism in Poland had begun to collapse, CBWA was dissolved. Under the newly elected democratic government of Poland, Zachęta became a national museum dedicated to modern art in 1990 known as Zacheta National Gallery of Art (Zachęta Narodowa Galeria Sztuki).

== See also ==
- Zachęta
- Muzeum Sztuki in Łódź
- Foksal Gallery
- Wojciech Fangor
- Henryk Stażewski
- Young Poland
