= Józef Brandt =

Polish painter (1841–1915)

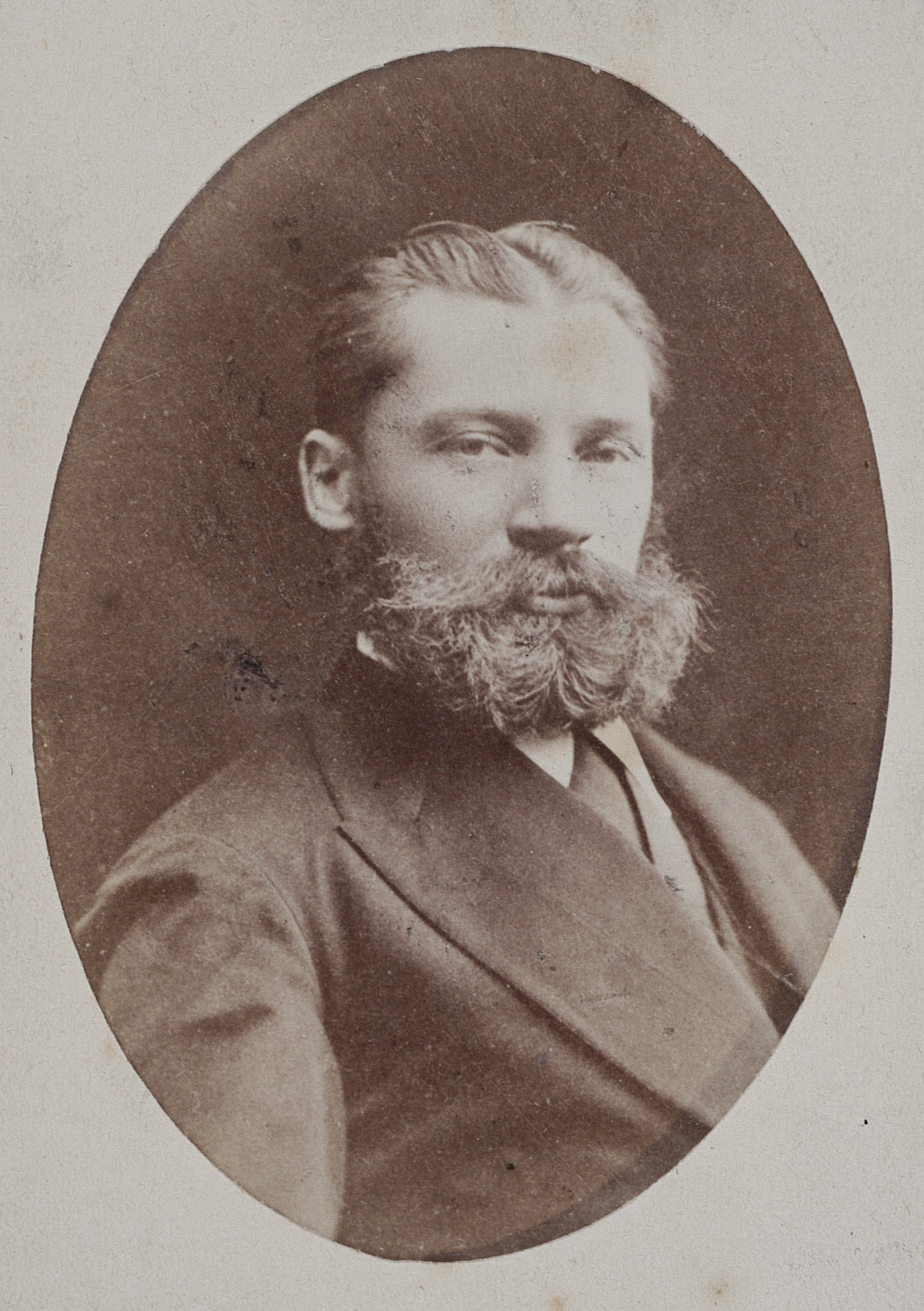
- Józef Brandt, 1880
- Born: 11 February 1841; Szczebrzeszyn
- Died: 12 June 1915 (aged 74); Radom
- Known for: Painting

Józef Brandt (1841–1915) was a Polish painter best known for his paintings of battles in Polish history, often featuring horses.

== Life ==
Brandt was born in Szczebrzeszyn. He studied in Warsaw in the school of J.N. Leszczynski and at the Noblemen's Institute. In 1858 he left for Paris to study at the Ecole centrale Paris but was persuaded by Juliusz Kossak to abandon engineering in favor of painting. He studied as a painter in Munich under Franz Adam and Karl Piloty and then opened his own studio.

His paintings mostly study 17th-century military life, though he has also made some studies of Polish peasant life.

In 1893, Brandt was awarded the Order of Isabella the Catholic, and in 1898, he became the recipient of the Bavarian Maximilian Order for Science and Art.

== Centre of Polish Sculpture ==
Brandt's 19th century manor house in Orońsko together with surrounding park serves today as the Centre of Polish Sculpture.

== Gallery ==
Józef Brandt's paintings

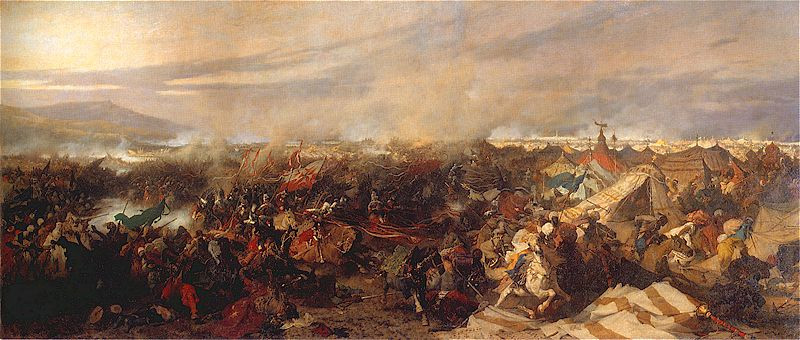
Battle of Vienna, oil on canvas 1873, Polish Army Museum

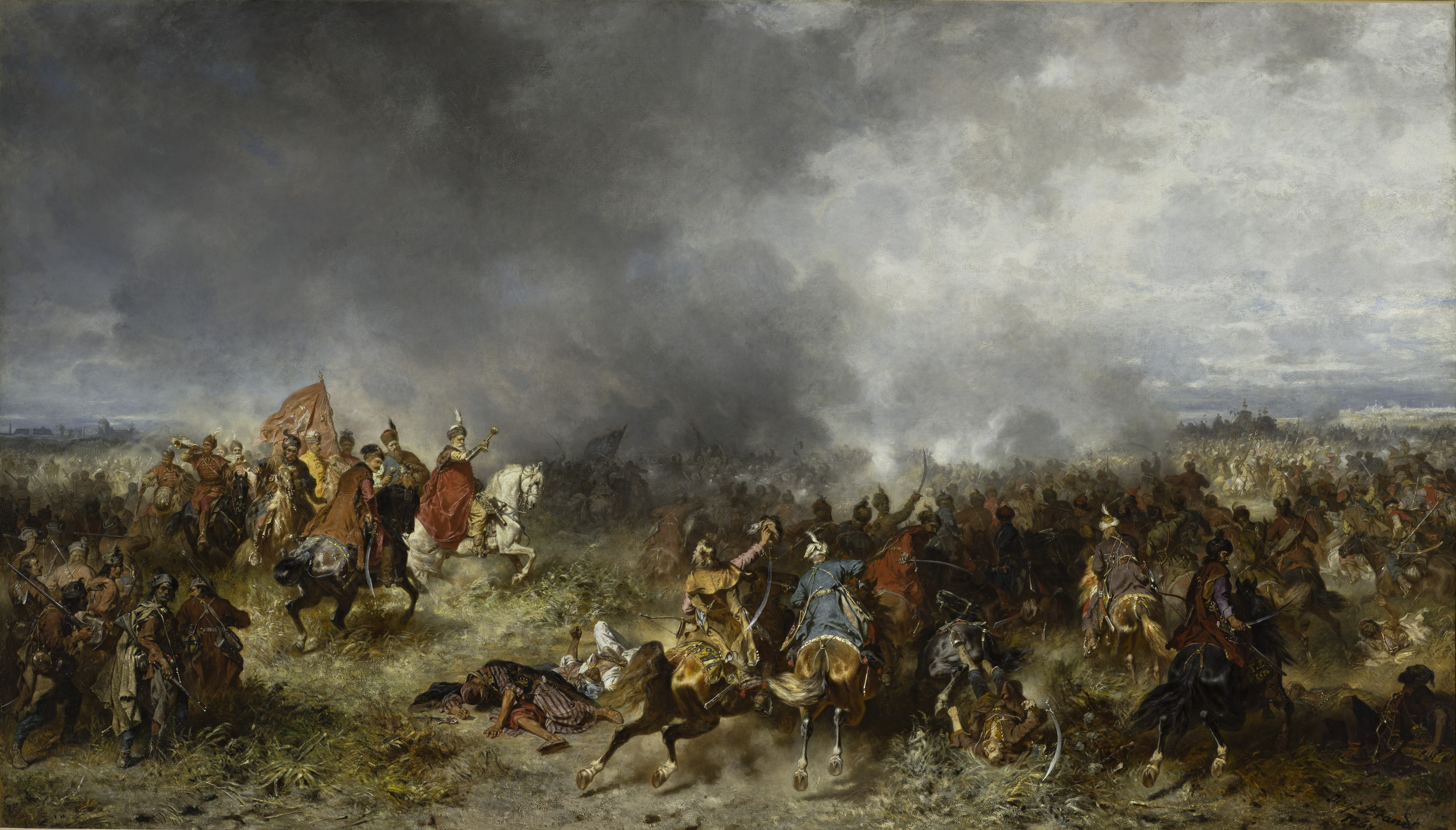
Jan Karol Chodkiewicz during the battle of Khotyn, oil on canvas 1865, National Museum, Warsaw

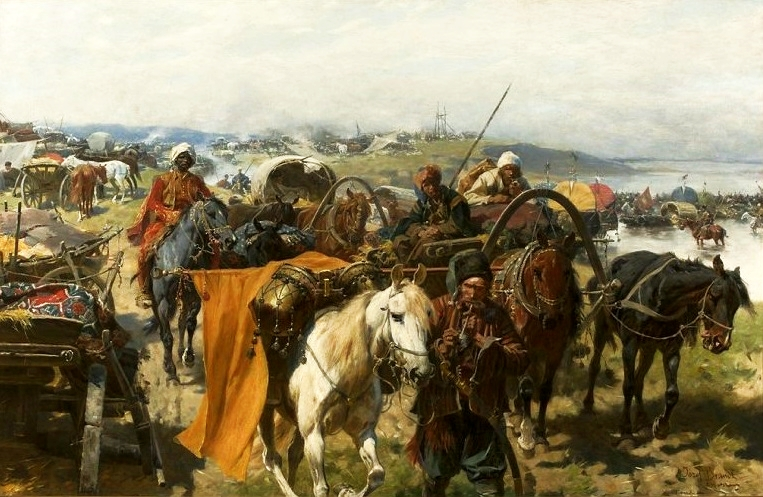
Zaporozhians' camp, oil on canvas 1880, National Museum, Warsaw

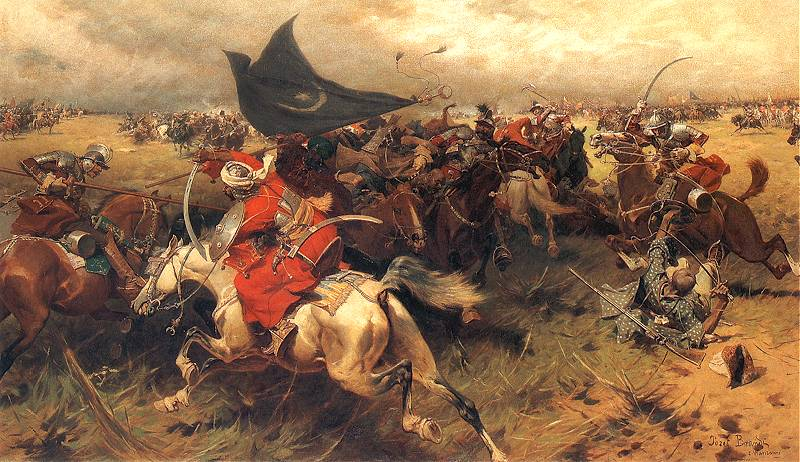
Battle over the Turkish Banner, oil on canvas 1905, National Museum, Kraków

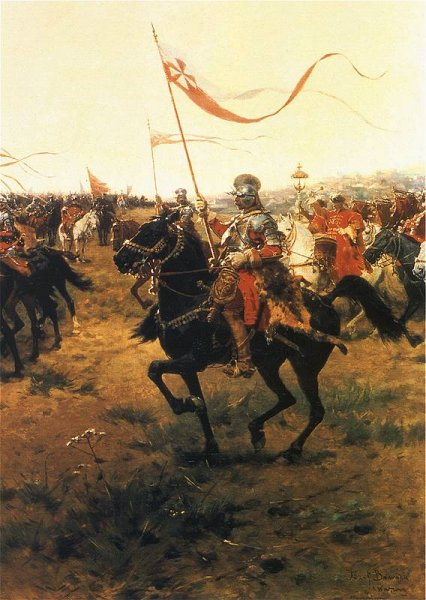
Polish Hussar, oil on canvas 1890, Polish Museum, Rapperswil

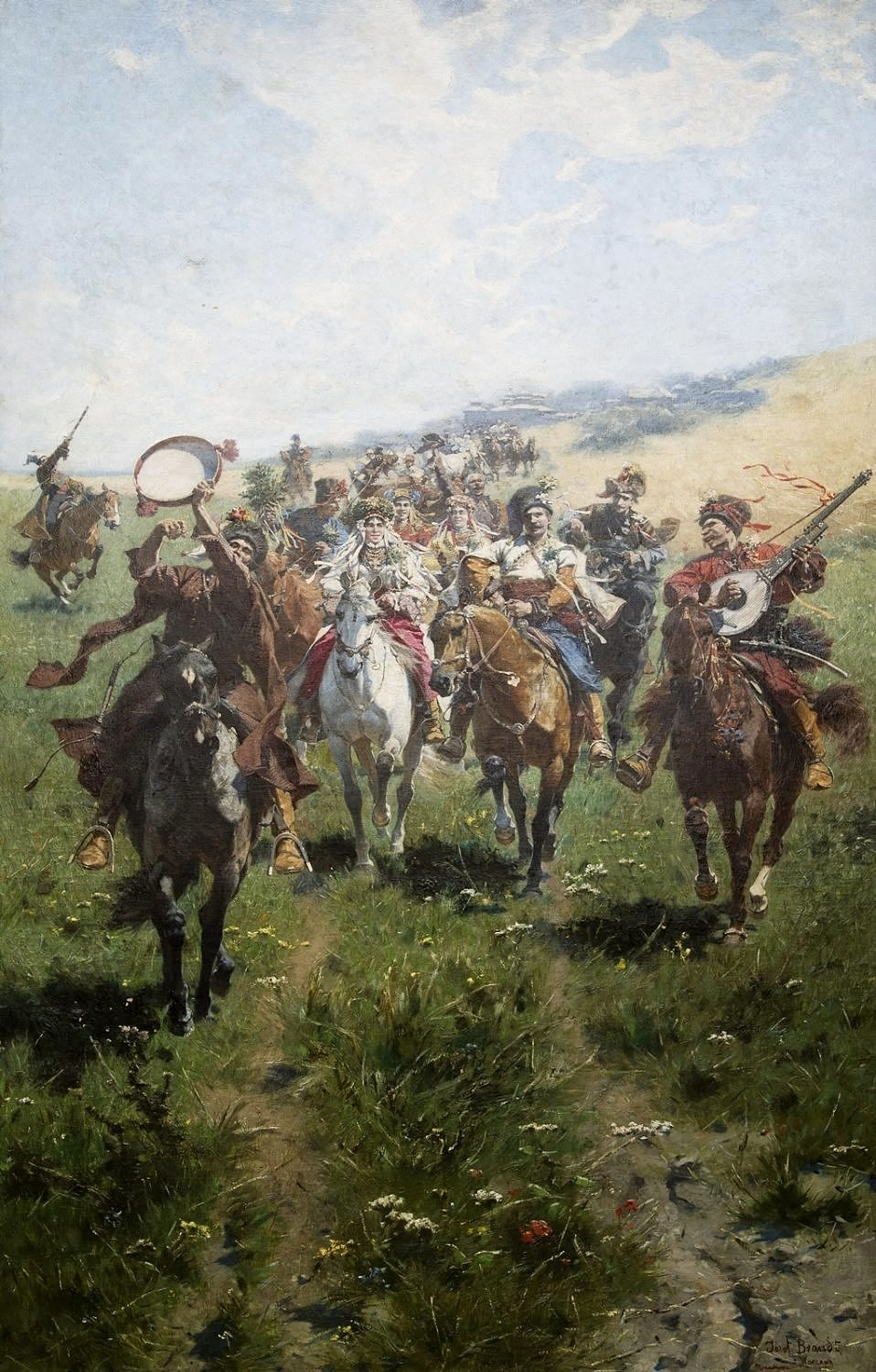
Cossacks' Wedding, oil on canvas 1893

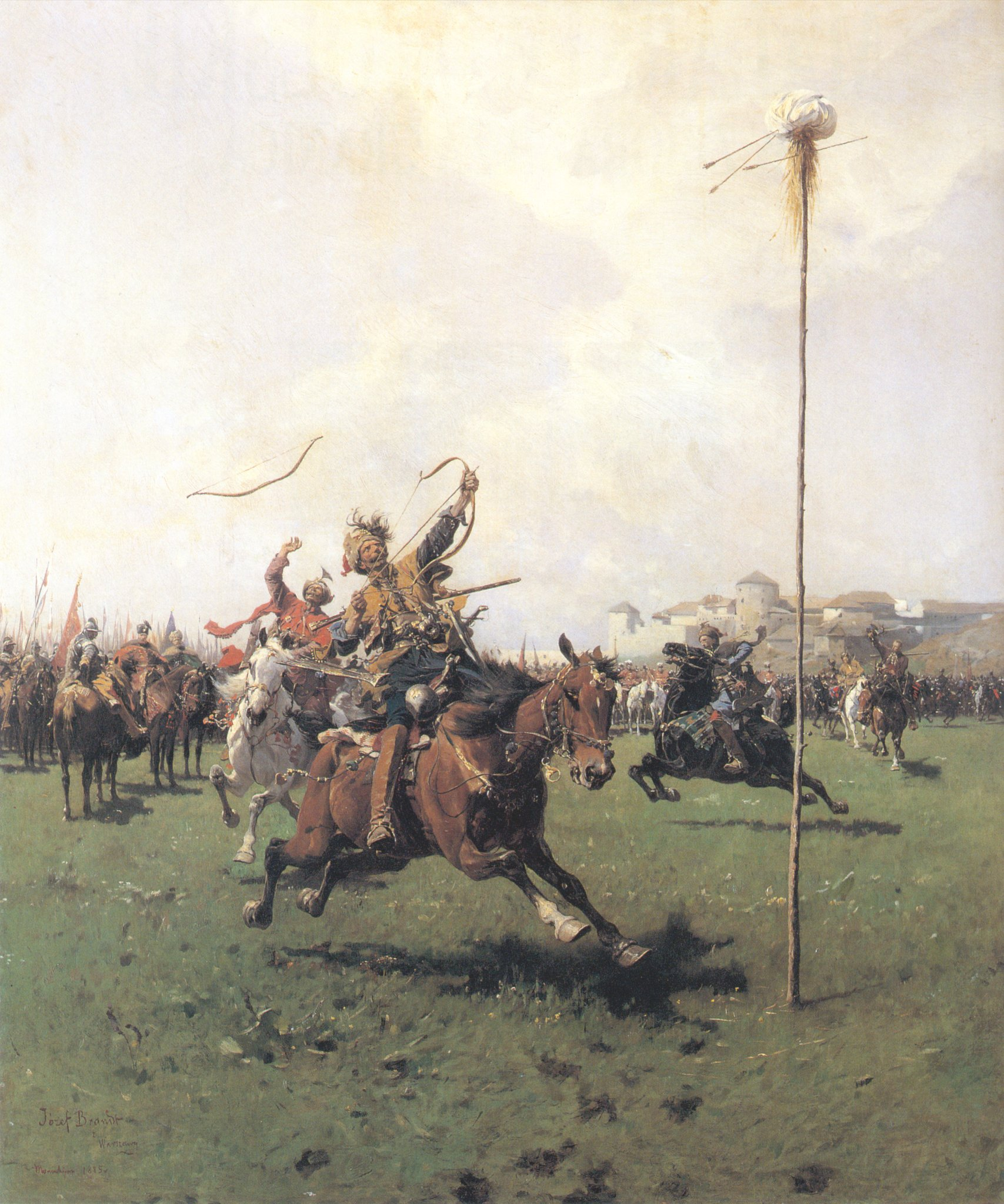
Lisowczycy (Archery), oil on canvas 1885, Kościuszko Foundation in New York

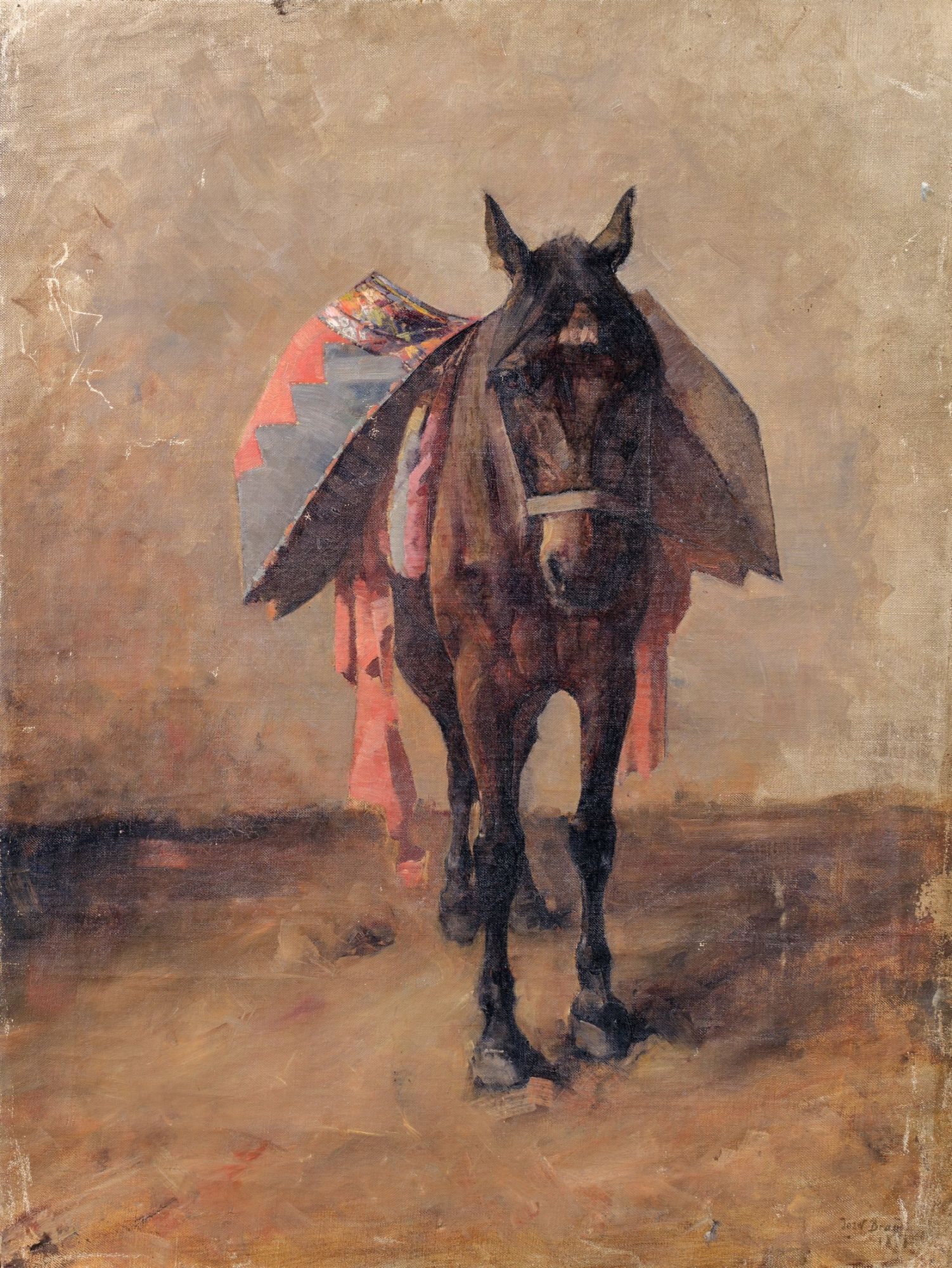
The burdened horse

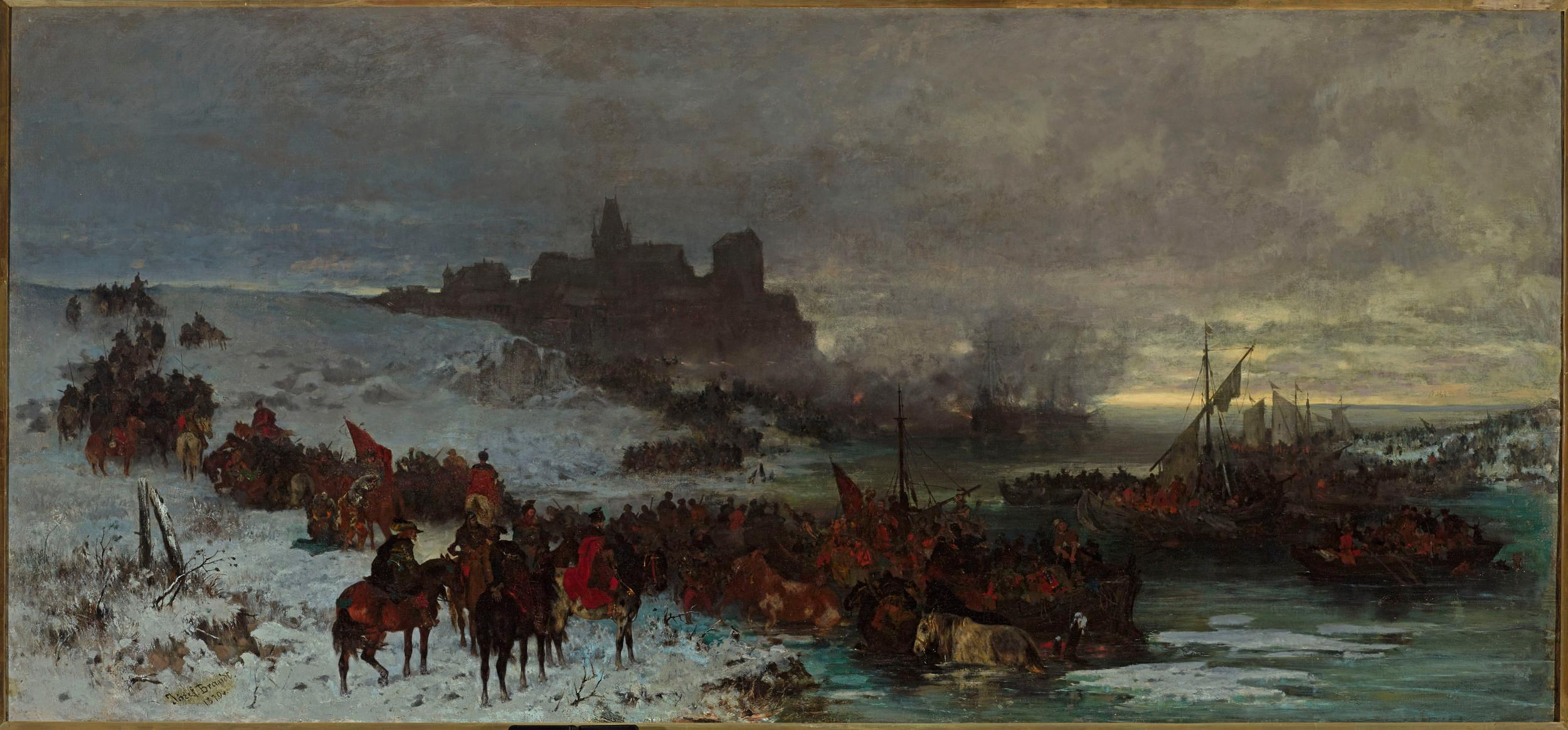
Stefan Czarniecki during the Battle of Sønderborg, commonly known as "Stefan Czarniecki during the Battle of Kolding", oil on canvas 1870, National Museum, Warsaw

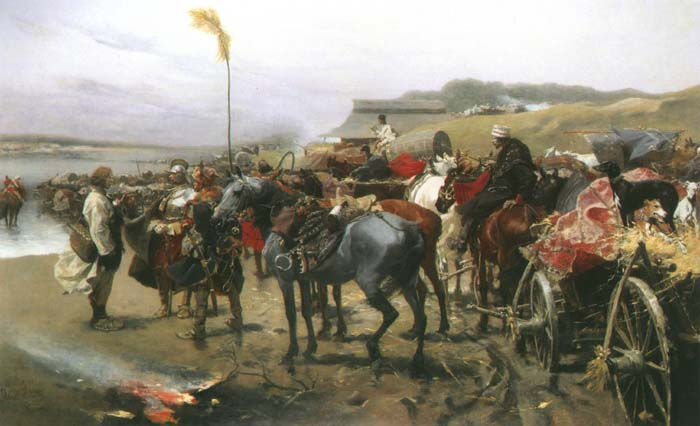
Militia at the Ford, oil on canvas 1880

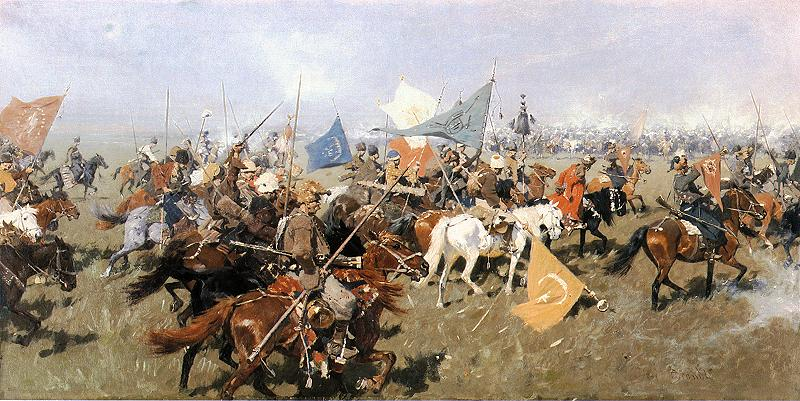
Return of the Cossacks, oil on canvas 1894

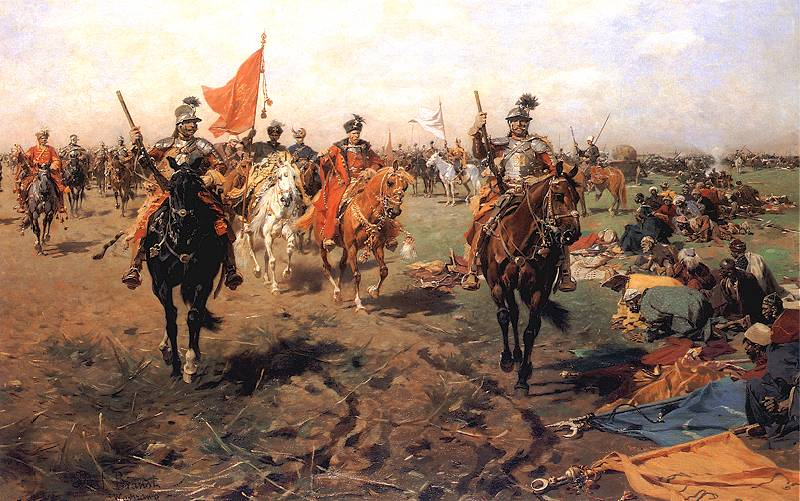
Inspection of the Trophy Banners, oil on canvas 1905

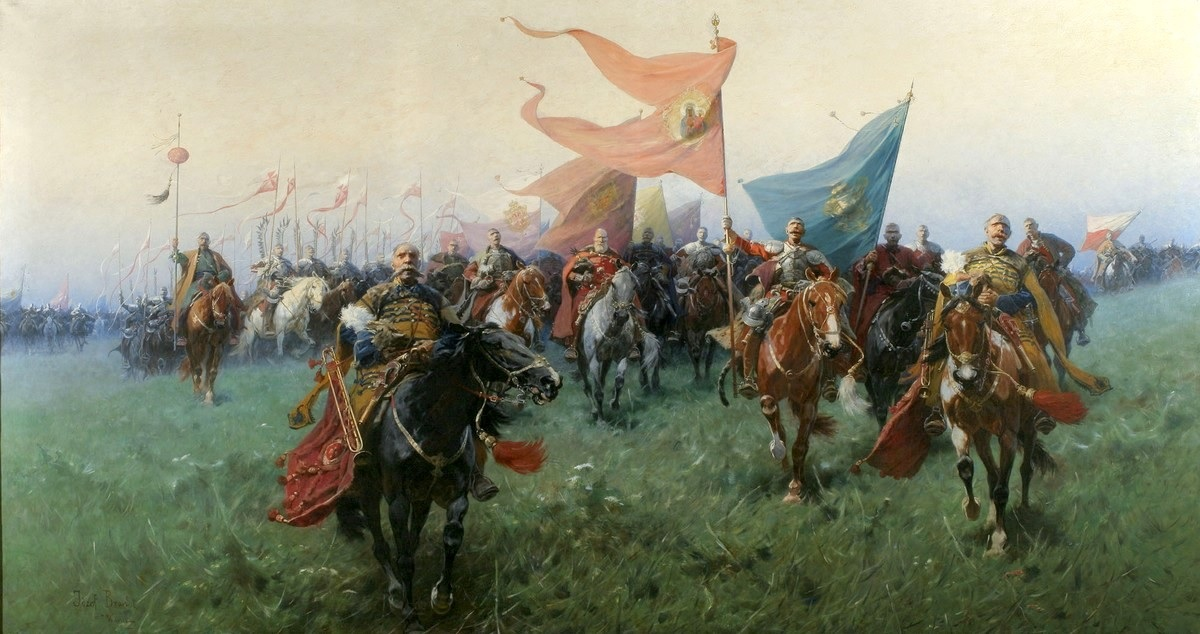
Bogurodzica, oil on canvas 1909, National Museum, Wrocław

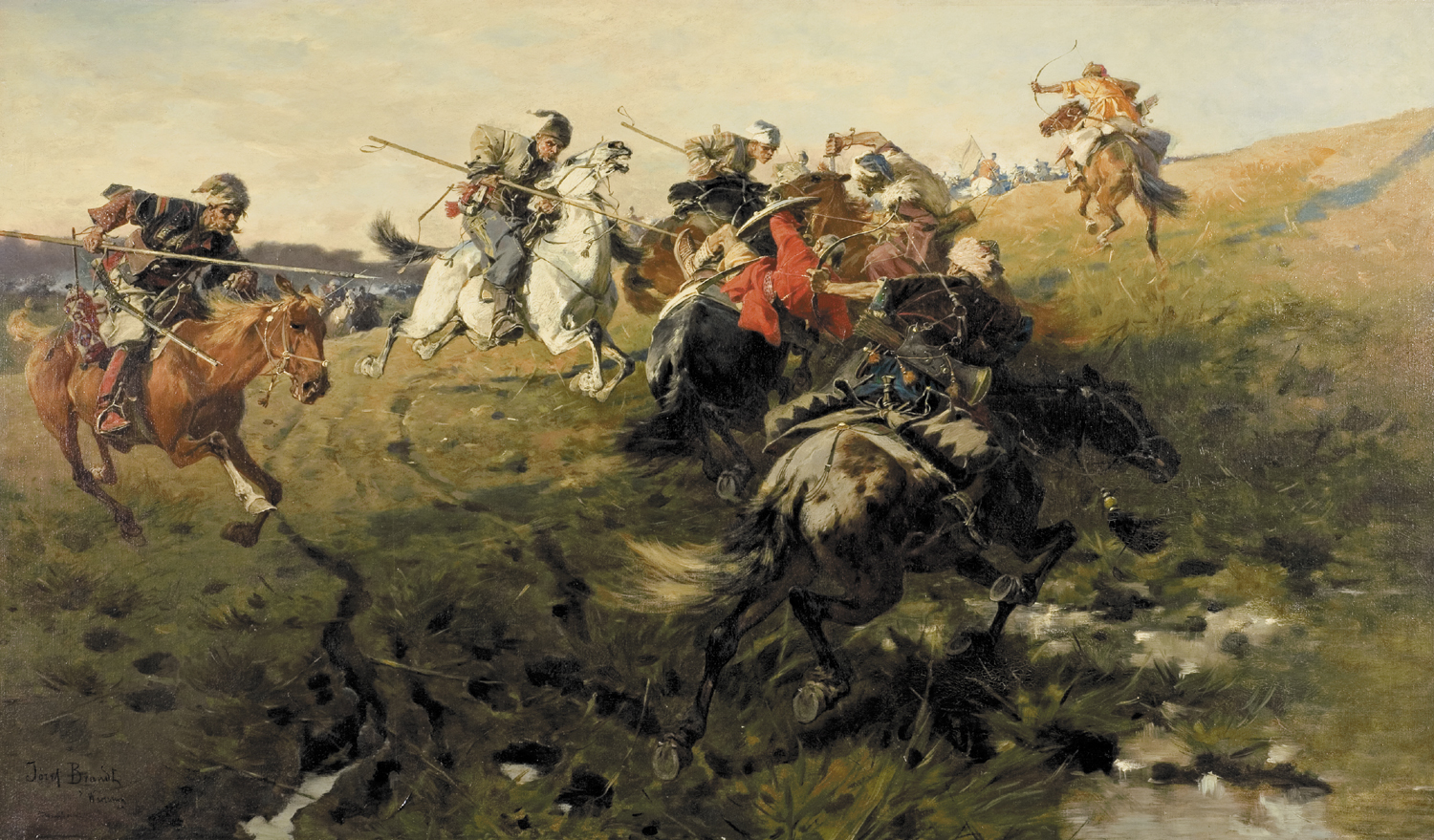
Skirmish Between Cossacks and Tatars, ca. 1890

== See also ==
- List of Polish painters
