= Alfred Schouppé =

Polish painter

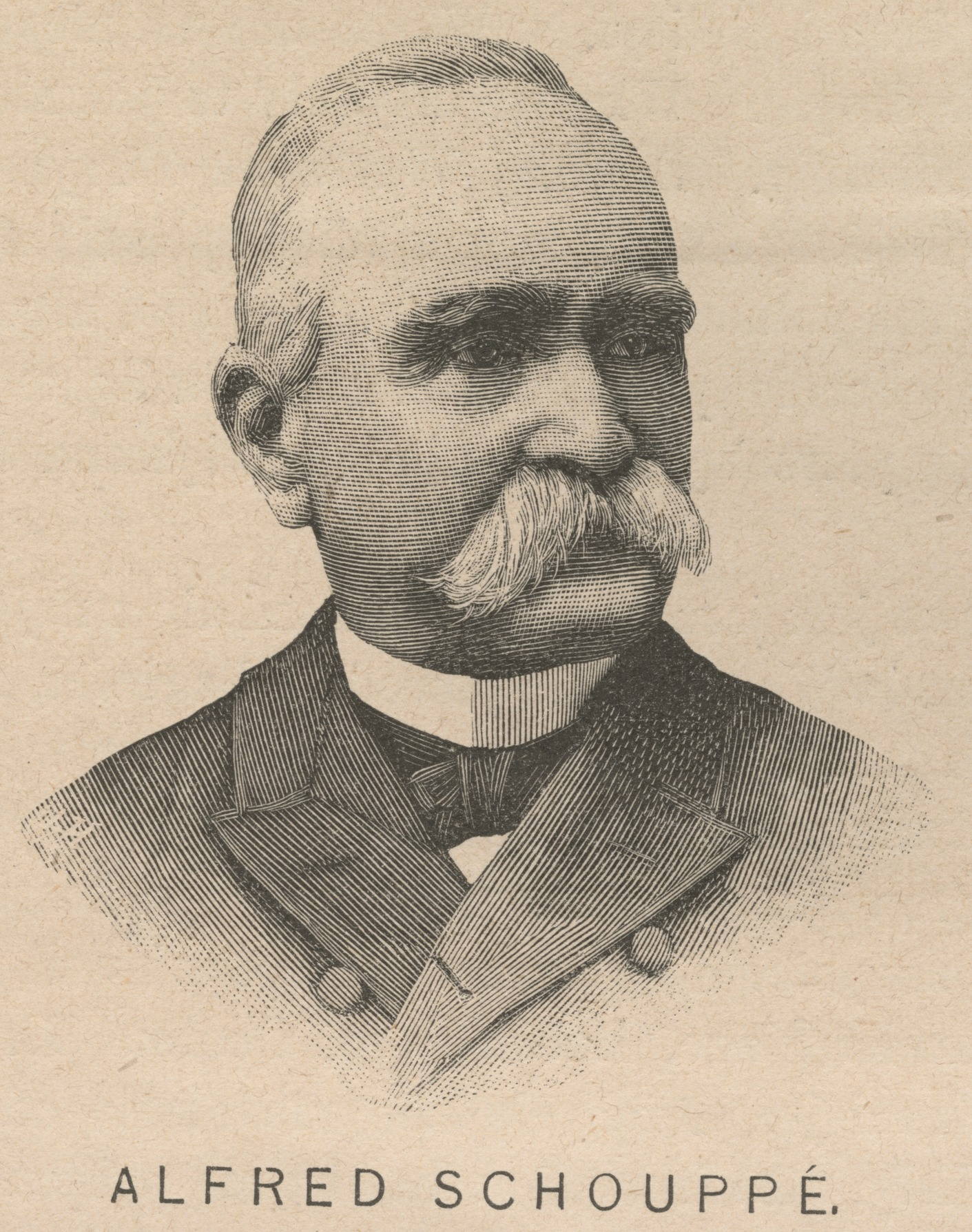
- Born: Alfred Schouppé; 23 December 1812; Grabownica Starzeńska, Poland
- Died: 7 April 1899; Krynica-Zdrój, Poland
- Education: Accademia di San Luca in Rome
- Known for: Painting
- Movement: Idealism

Alfred Schouppé (December 13, 1812 – April 7, 1899) was a Polish painter, and one of the founders of the Society for the Encouragement of Fine Arts (Towarzystwo Zachęty Sztuk Pięknych) in Warsaw.

== Biography ==
He was born in Grabownica Starzeńska. He studied in Kraków, where he was a student of Jan Nepomucen Głowacki and Józef Richter in Warsaw. In 1837, by gaining a scholarship Schouppé began studying at the Accademia di San Luca, returning to Warsaw in 1840. He took part in a number of foreign travels, and after going into retirement in 1897 he moved out of Warsaw. Nearly every year he visited the Tatra Mountains. His Tatra landscape paintings are characterised with idealism. He also painted religious paintings and had been illustrating with Juliusz Kossak. He died in 1899, in Krynica-Zdrój.

== Selected paintings ==
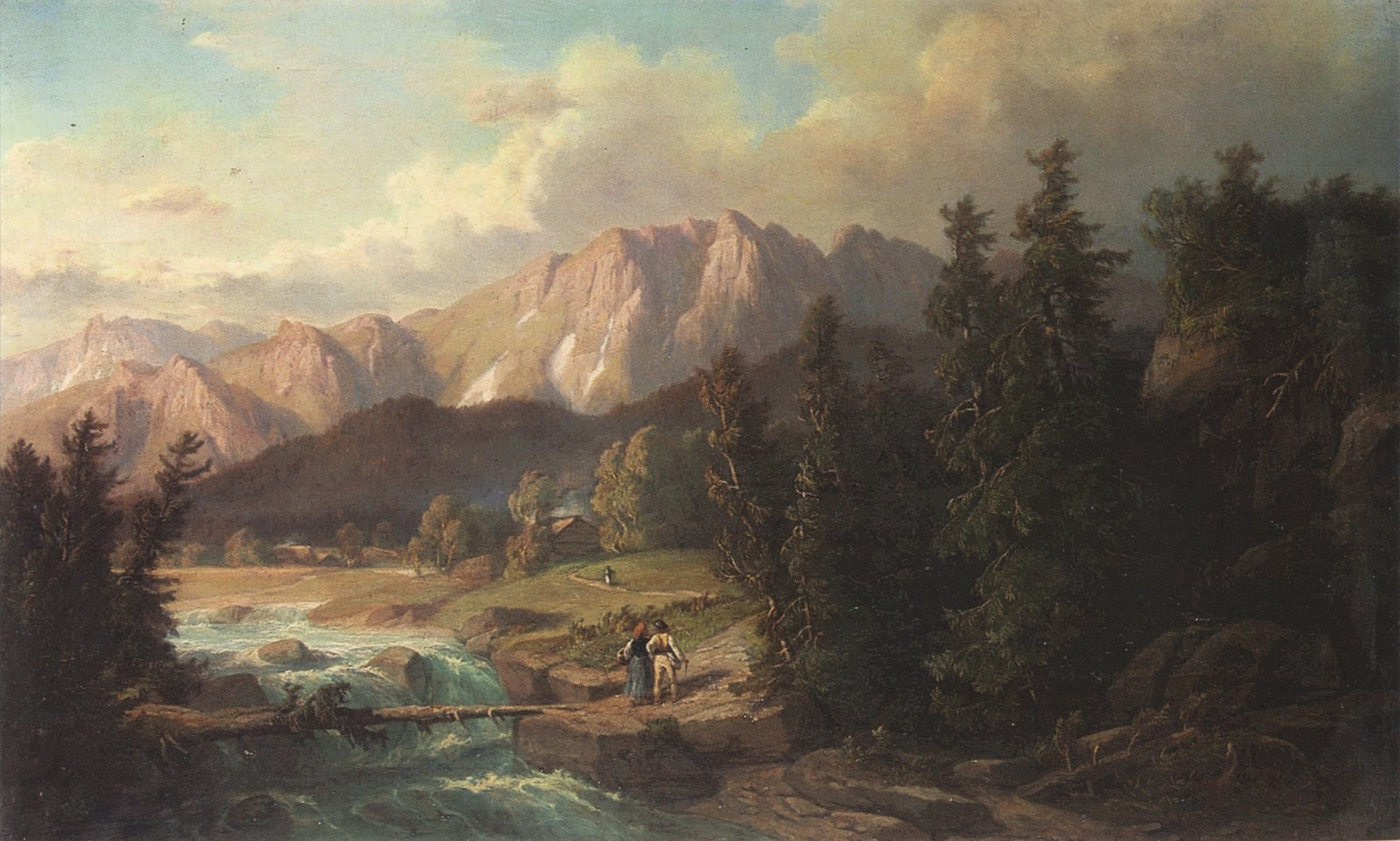
View of the Tatras
(1849)

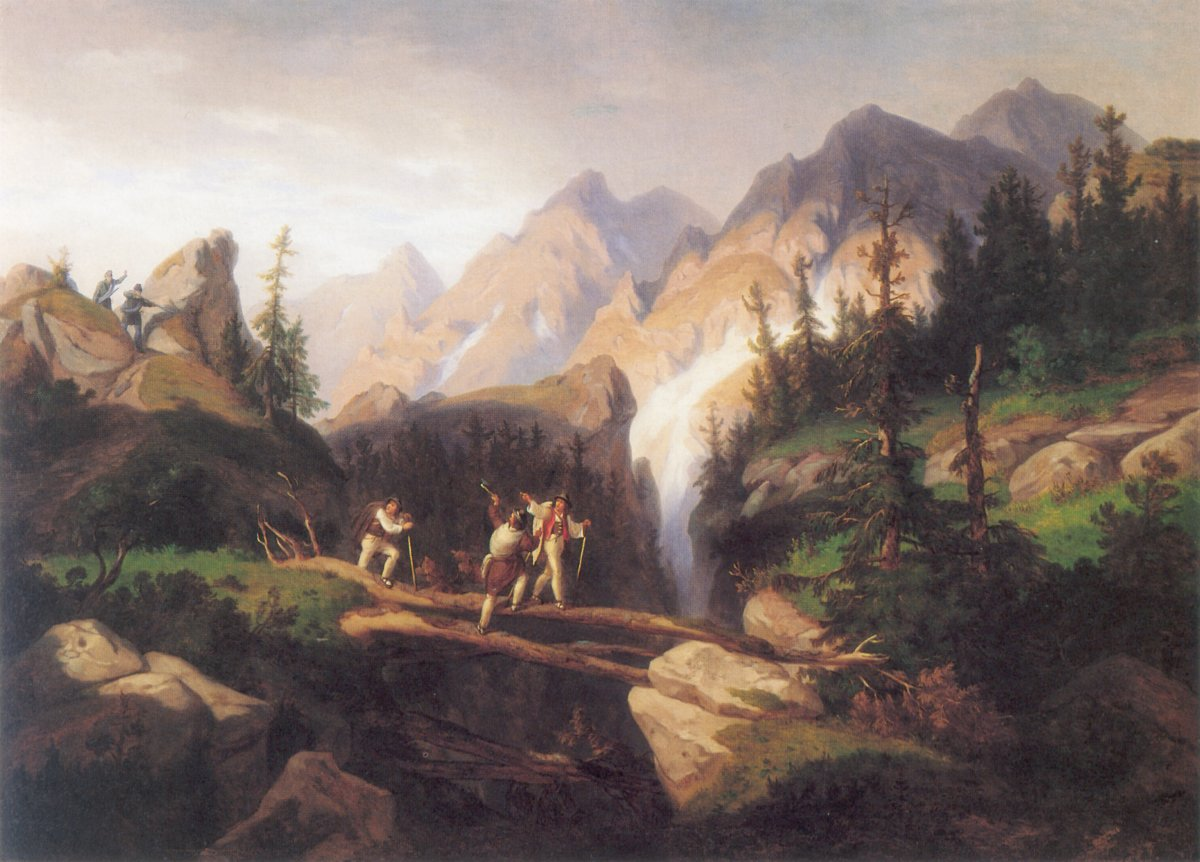
Smugglers
(1870)

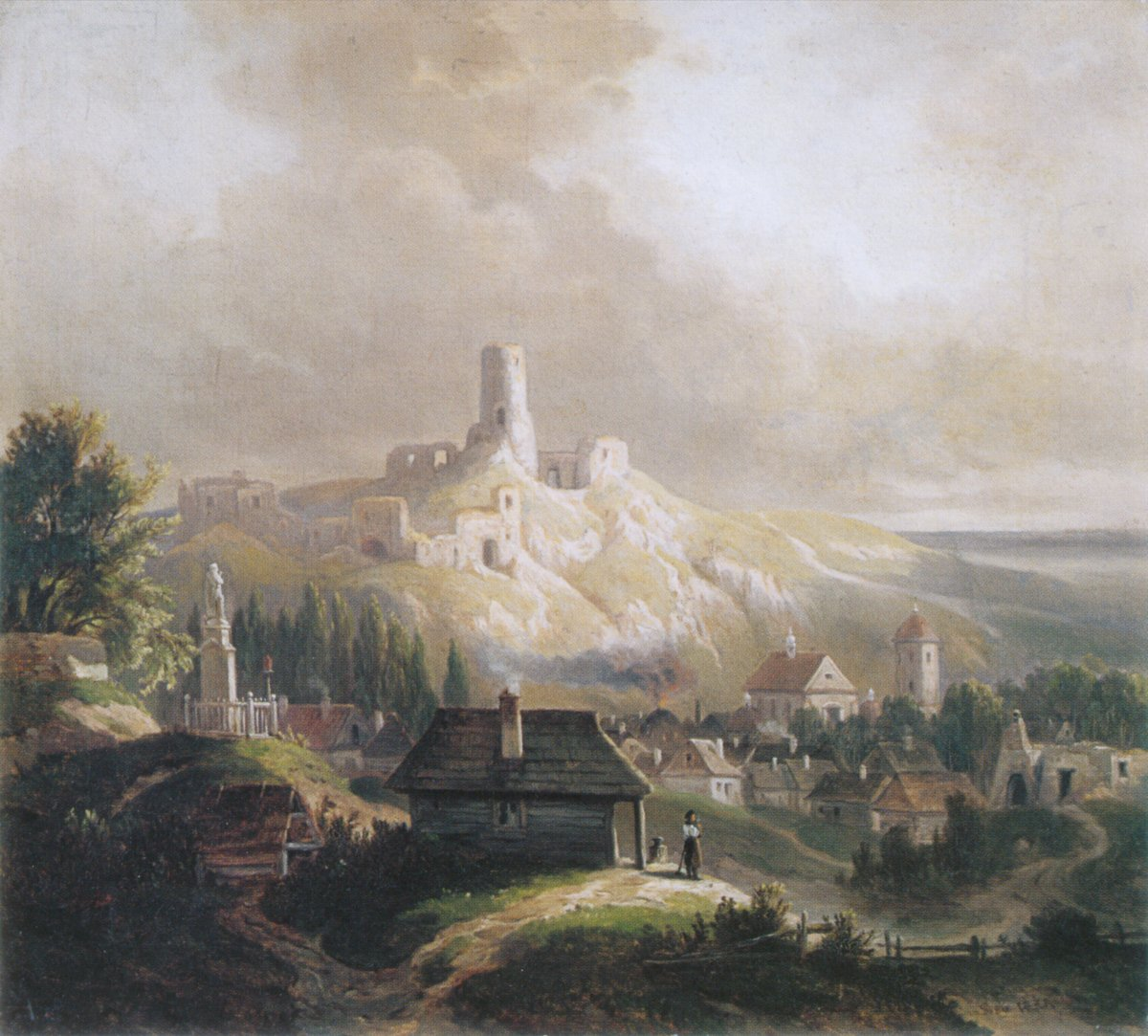
View of Iłza
(1880)
