= Osobowice Cemetery =

Cemetery in Wroclaw, Poland

Coordinates: 51°8′9″N 17°0′39″E

- Cmentarz Osobowicki
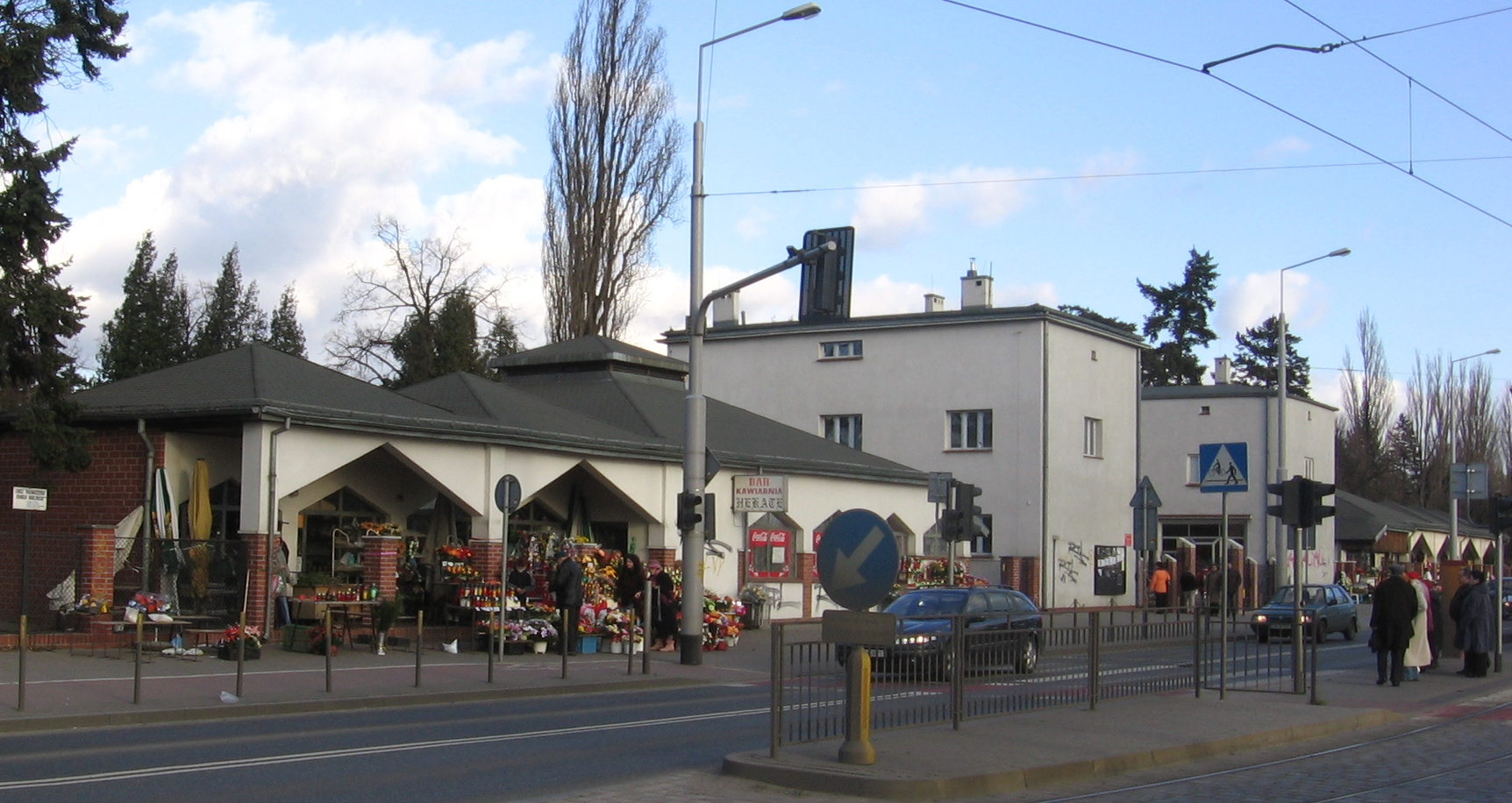
- Entrance to Osobowice Cemetery from Osobowicka Street, Wrocław
- Interactive map of Osobowice Cemetery

Details
- Established: 1867
- Location: Osobowice-Rędzin, Wrocław
- Country: Poland
- Type: Communal

The Osobowice Cemetery (German: Friedhof Oswitz) is a large municipal cemetery in Wrocław (the capital of the Lower Silesian Voivodeship), Poland. It is located along Osobowicka 47-59 Street. It covers the area of 52 hectares (130 acres).

== Notable burials ==
- Adolf Anderssen
- Agata Kowalska-Szubert
