= Prawda Wileńska =

Polish-language Soviet newspaper

Prawda Wileńska (Wilno's Truth) was a Polish-language Soviet newspaper published in Vilnius in 1940–1948 with a hiatus between 1941–1944.

== See also ==
- Pravda
