= Orońsko =

- Village
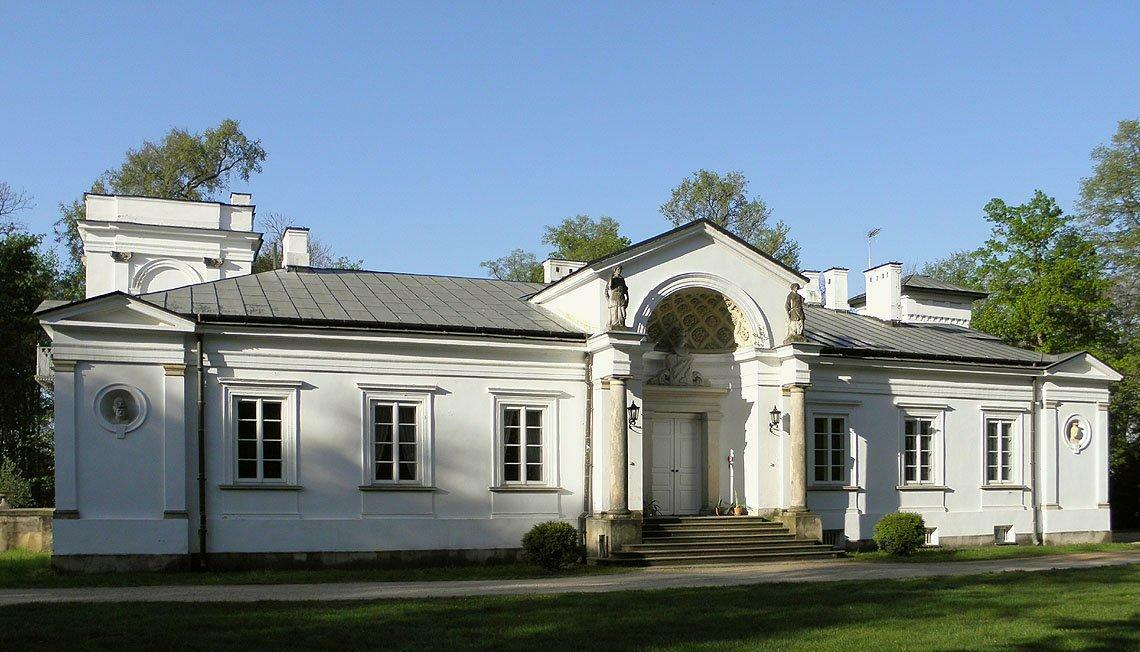

- Coat of arms

- Location within Poland
- Coordinates: 51°19′N 20°59′E
- Country: Poland
- Voivodeship: Masovian
- County: Szydłowiec
- Gmina: Orońsko
- Population: 1,200

Orońsko [ɔˈrɔɲskɔ] is a village in Szydłowiec County, Masovian Voivodeship, in east-central Poland. It is the seat of the gmina (administrative district) called Gmina Orońsko.
