= Ciesielski =

Ciesielski (Polish pronunciation: [tɕɛˈɕɛlski]; feminine: Ciesielska) is a Polish-language surname derived from any of locations named Cieśle and possibly a patronymic surname derived from the nickname or surname Cieśla (literally "carpenter"). Notable people with this surname include:

- (Andrzej Ciesielski (second half of the 16th century), Polish-Lithuanian political writer, economist and noble politician
- Jerzy Ciesielski (1929–1970), Polish Roman Catholic figure
- Krzysztof Ciesielski, Polish road cyclist
- Maria Ciesielska, Polish medical historian
- Maria Ciesielska (actress) (born 1934), Polish actress
- Sævar Ciesielski, Icelander convicted in the Guðmundur and Geirfinnur case
- Tomasz Ciesielski (born 1979), Polish footballer
- Zbigniew Ciesielski (1934–2020), Polish mathematician

== See also ==
- Tsiselsky
