= List of political authors =

This is a list of authors of writings on political subjects.

== A–M ==
- Gheorghe Alexandrescu (1912–2005)
- Andrej Amalrik (1938–1980)
- Jeffrey Howard Archer, Baron Archer of Weston-super-Mare (1940-2026)
- Aristotle (384 BC–322 BC)
- Emily Rose Bleby (1849–1917)
- David Bollier (living)
- Harry Browne (1933–2006)
- William F. Buckley Jr. (1925–2008)
- Andrzej Ciesielski
- Noam Chomsky (born 1928)
- Ann Coulter (born 1961)
- Andy Croft (born 1956)
- Elizabeth Drew (born 1935)
- Dinesh D'Souza (born 1960)
- Thomas R. Dye (born 1935)
- Koenraad Elst (born 1959)
- Filip Erceg (born 1979)
- David D. Friedman (born 1945)
- David Gauthier (1932–2023)
- Sita Ram Goel (1921–2003)
- Jürgen Habermas (born 1929)
- Chaudhry Afzal Haq (1891–1942)
- Johann Gottfried von Herder (1744–1803)
- Adolf Hitler (1889–1945)
- Thomas Hobbes (1588–1679)
- Aldous Huxley (1894–1963)
- Jane Jacobs (1916–2006)
- Alireza Jafarzadeh
- Michael Johns (born 1964)
- Agha Shorish Kashmiri (1917–1975)
- Frances Moore Lappé (born 1944)
- Lawrence Lessig (born 1961)
- John Locke (1632–1704)
- Józef Mackiewicz (1902–1985)
- Karl Marx (1818–1883)
- Richard Maybury (born 1946)
- David McCullough (1933–2022)
- John Stuart Mill (1806–1873)
- Janbaz Mirza
- Ludwig von Mises (1881–1973)

== N–Z ==
- Jan Narveson (born 1936)
- George Orwell (1903–1950)
- Greg Palast (born 1952)
- Plato (c. 427 BC – c. 347 BC)
- Carleton Putnam (1901–1998)
- Roberto Quaglia (born 1962)
- John Rawls (1921–2002)
- Jeremy Rifkin (born 1946)
- Jean-Jacques Rousseau (1712–1778)
- Jean-Paul Sartre (1905–1980)
- Henriette Sauret (1890–1976)
- Roger Scruton (1944–2020)
- Amartya Sen (born 1933)
- Vandana Shiva (born 1952)
- Arun Shourie (born 1941)
- Charles E. Silberman (1925–2011)
- Guy Smith (born 1957)
- Jean Edward Smith (1932–2019)
- Lysander Spooner (1808–1887)
- Ram Swarup (1920–1998)
- George Thayer (1933–1973)
- Hunter S. Thompson (1937–2005)
- Henry David Thoreau (1817–1862)
- Berhanu Zerihun (1933/4–1987)
- Slavoj Žižek (born 1949)
- Alexander Hamilton (1755–1805)

== See also ==
- Lists of writers
