= Cieśla =

Cieśla (Polish pronunciation: [ˈt͡ɕɛɕla]) is an occupational surname derived from the Polish word for the occupation of carpentry. It may refer to:

- Andrew R. Ciesla (born 1953), American politician
- Claudia Ciesla (born 1987), Polish-German actress
- Hank Ciesla (1934–1976), Canadian ice hockey player
- Maciej Cieśla (born 1988), Polish painter
- Maciej Szymon Cieśla (1989–2016), Polish digital artist
- Michał Cieśla (born 1981), Polish basketball player
- Piotr Cieśla (born 1955), Polish handball player
