= Eugeniusz Geppert Academy of Fine Arts =

Educational institution in Wrocław, Poland

Coordinates: 51°06′41″N 17°02′37″E

The Eugeniusz Geppert Academy of Arts and Design in Wroclaw
- Akademia Sztuk Pięknych im. Eugeniusza Gepperta we Wrocławiu
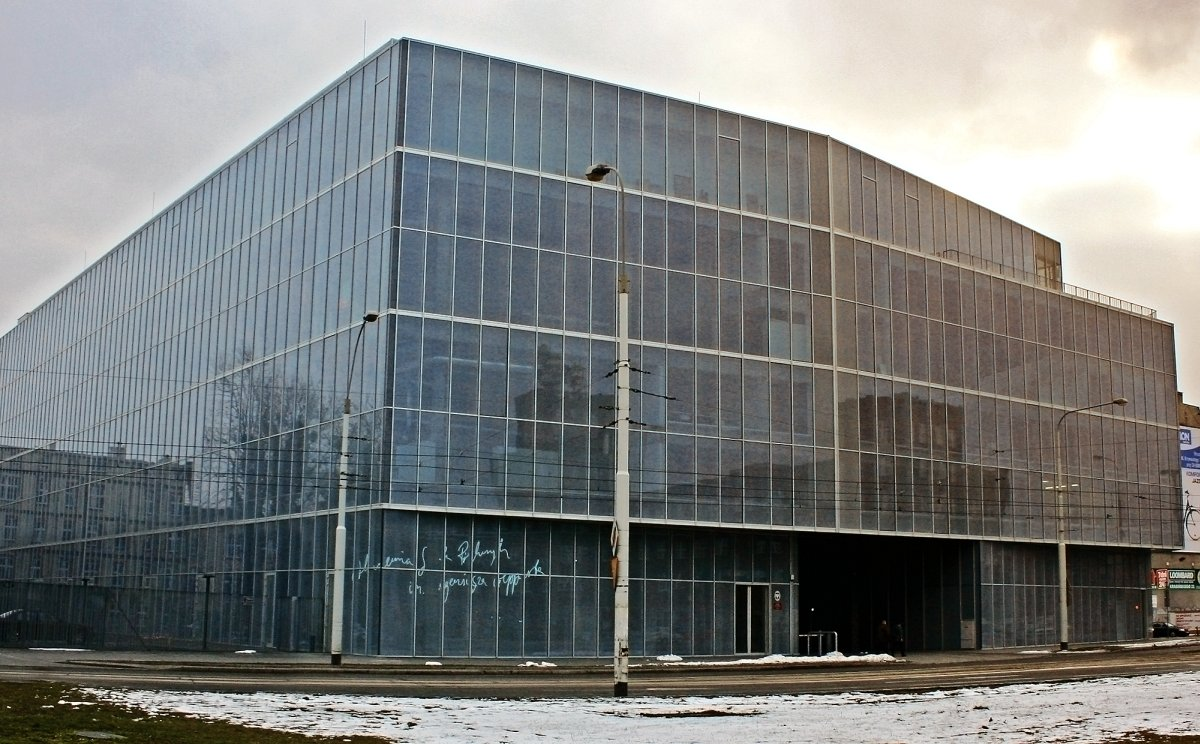
- Type: Public
- Established: 1946
- Rector: Professor Wojciech Pukocz
- Faculty: 5 faculties
- Location: ul. Plac Polski 3/4, 50-156, Wrocław, Lower Silesian Voivodeship, Poland
- Campus: Urban
- Website: www.asp.wroc.pl

The Eugeniusz Geppert Academy of Arts and Design in Wrocław (Polish: Akademia Sztuk Pięknych im. Eugeniusza Gepperta we Wrocławiu) is a public institution of higher learning established in 1946 originally as the College of Fine Arts. From 2008 the university bears the name of Polish master-painter Eugeniusz Geppert.

== History ==
In January 1946, on the recommendation of Poland's Minister of Culture and Arts, Eugeniusz Geppert was entrusted with the task of establishing the Higher School of Fine Arts in the city of Wrocław which had been ravaged by war. Two buildings were chosen to house the school: the pre-war Municipal School of Crafts and Art Crafts (now located at ul. Traugutta) and former State Academy of Arts and Crafts.

Staff of the newly formed institutions was composed of painters such as Leon Dołżycki, Emil Krcha, Stanisław Pękalski, Maria Dawska; painter, graphic artist and designer Stanisław Dawski, glass designer Halina Jastrzębowska, interior and furniture designers Władysław Wincze and Marian Sigmund, as well as ceramists Julia Kotarbińska and Rudolf Krzywiec. The following years brought the faculty and school graduates many successes at national and international exhibitions and art competitions. In 1957 emerged the already-historical Theatre of the Senses (Teatr Sensybilistyczny) combining happening action of experimental theater with the performance art.

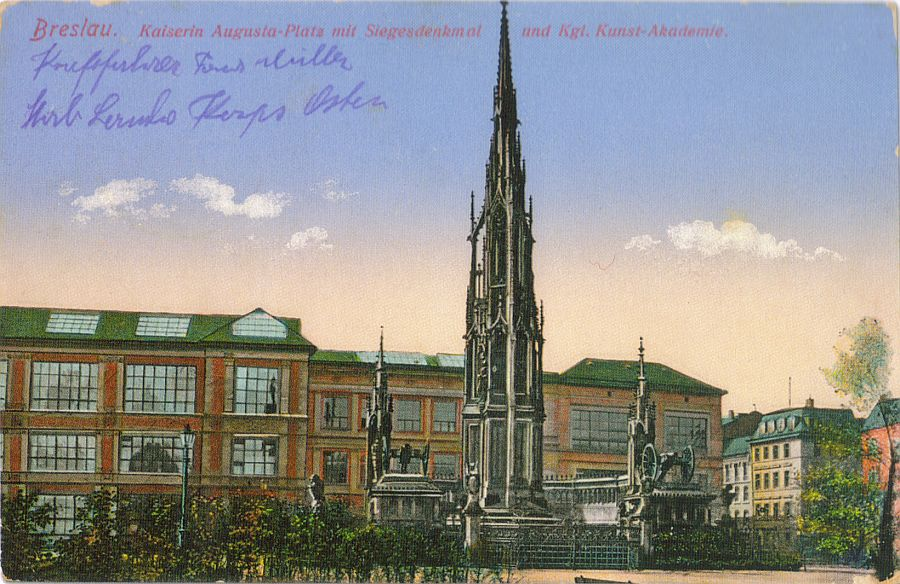
Former Akademie für Kunst und Kunstgewerbe, ul. Plac Polski 3/4

Since its inception the school bore the following names: College of Fine Arts (1946–1949), State College of Fine Arts (1949–1996), Academy of Fine Arts in Wrocław (1996–2008) and since 2008, the Eugeniusz Geppert Academy of Arts and Design.

== Faculties ==
- Faculty of Painting
  - Department of Painting
  - Department of Drawing
  - Department of Painting in Architecture and Multimedia
- Faculty of Sculpture and Art Mediation
  - Department of Sculpture
  - Department of Artistic Education
- Faculty of Graphic Arts and Media
  - Department of Printmaking
  - Department of Graphic Designing
  - Department of Media Art
- Faculty of Ceramics and Glass
  - Department of Ceramics
  - Department of Glass
  - Department of Ceramics & Glass Conservation and Restoration
  - Department of Interdisciplinary Activities in Ceramics and Glass
- Faculty of Interior Architecture, Design and Stage Design
  - Department of Interior Design
  - Department of Furniture Design
  - Department of Design
  - Department of Stage Design

== List of rectors ==
- Eugeniusz Geppert: 1946–1950
- Mieczysław Pawełko: 1950–1952
- Stanisław Dawski: 1952–1965
- Stanisław Pękalski: 1965–1967
- Tadeusz Forowicz: 1967–1980
- Jan Jaromir Aleksiun: 1980–1982
- Rufin Kominek: 1982–1984
- Michał Jędrzejewski: 1984–1990
- Andrzej Klimczak-Dobrzański: 1990–1993
- Konrad Jarocki: 1993–1999
- Zbigniew Horbowy: 1999–2005
- Jacek Szewczyk: 2005–2012
- Piotr Kielan: 2012–2020
- Wojciech Pukocz: 2020–present

== Notable alumni ==
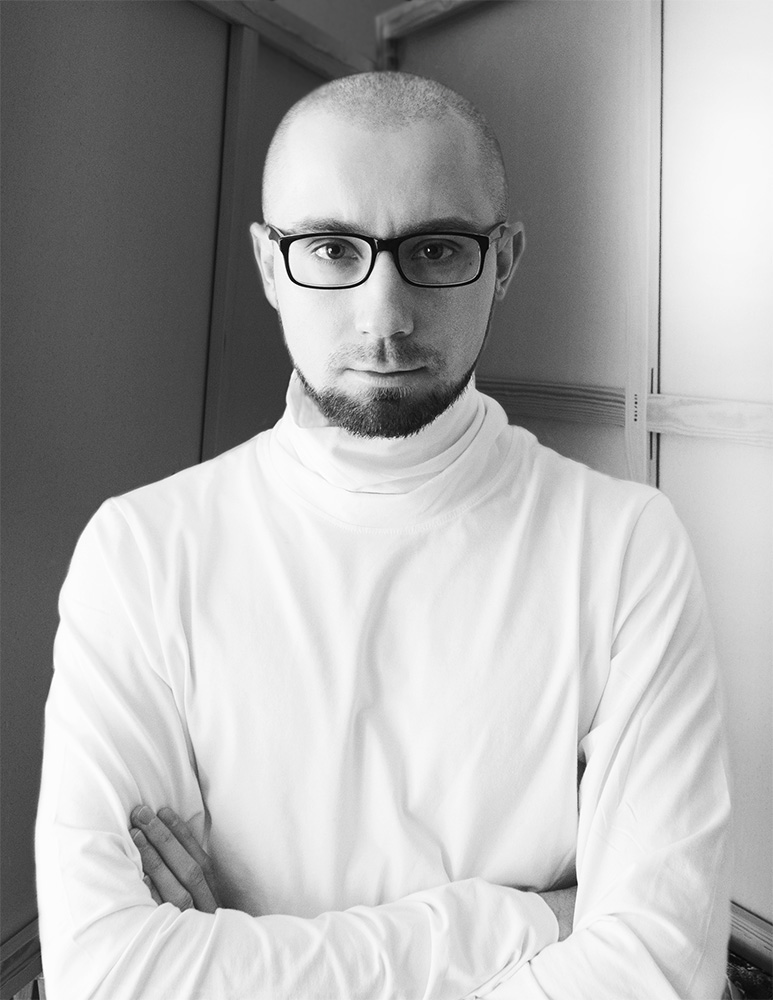
Maciej Cieśla

- Maciej Cieśla (born 1988), contemporary painter
- Zbigniew Horbowy (1935–2019), glass artist
- Zbigniew Kupczynski (born 1928), painter
- Natalia LL (1937–2022), painter, photographer and performance artist, a pioneer of feminist art in Poland
- Eugeniusz Molski (born 1942), artist, painter and sculptor
- Lech Rzewuski (1941–2004), painter
- Mira Żelechower-Aleksiun (born 1941), painter
