= Zbigniew Horbowy =

Uncle of Polish-American Artist Benjamin Horbowy

- Born: 28 October 1935; Łanczyn, Poland
- Died: 17 June 2019 (aged 83); Polanica-Zdrój, Poland
- Education: Wrocław Academy of Fine Arts
- Occupations: artist, design school creator

Zbigniew Horbowy (28 October 1935 – 17 June 2019) was a Polish artist working in industrial design, both artistic and applied glassmaking, professor at the Faculty of Ceramics and Glass and rector of the Wrocław Academy of Fine Arts. He was an influential Polish designer of utility glass and created his own design school.

== Early life and education ==
Horbowy was born in Poland, in the village of Łanczyn in the Nadwórna County of the Stanisławów Voivodeship (now Lanchyn in Nadvirna Raion, Ukraine). His family soon moved to the city of Kolomyia. After World War II he and his family were forcibly resettled from Kolomyia to Kargowa near Zielona Góra in western Poland, where he attended elementary school. He went to high school in nearby Wolsztyn.

Although Horbowy had intended to attend the Silesian University of Technology, as he had always been interested in mechanics, he was persuaded to apply to the State College of Fine Arts in Wrocław, where he was admitted in 1953. There he studied under Professor Stanisław Dawski, at the time the rector of the college, and director of the Faculty of Ceramics and Glass. Horbowy graduated in 1959, with his fine arts project being a full set of table glasses. He was the first student in Poland to graduate in Glass Design.

== Career ==
In 1959 Horbowy went to work as a designer for Huta Szkła Gospodarcza (HSG) at their "Sudety" Glassworks in Szczytna Śląska near Kłodzko. Huta Szkła Gospodarcza was an industrial concern which produced products such as kerosene lamps, and their glass department originally produced globes (cylinders) for kerosene lamps and window glass, but had expanded into other consumer glass products. It was here that Horbowy began experimenting with glass shapes and colors. Although his early works lacked the crisp colors of his later works, the shapes that he turned out were "delightful".

In 1974, on his initiative, HSG opened the "Barbara" Glassworks in Polanica-Zdrój, with Horbowy as artistic director. Beginning in 1978, he worked as a designer at the Zjednoczone Zespoly Gospodarcze INCO glassworks in Wrocław. In all he worked with commercial glassworks for thirty years.

During this time, 1974–1990, Horbowy wrought a revolution in thinking about glass, leading to the creation of interesting and beautiful glass forms, but produced on a massive scale as utensils.

In 1963 he joined the Faculty of Ceramics and Glass at the State College of Fine Arts in (now Eugeniusz Geppert Academy of Fine Arts), where he taught until 2006. In 1989 he received a full professorship there and became head of the glass department. Later he became vice dean, dean, vice rector and then rector of the Academy of Fine Arts. It was in the years 1999 to 2005 that he was the rector there. Among his students were Małgorzata Dajewska and Ryszard Bilan.

Horbowy died on 17 June 2019 in Polanica-Zdrój.

== Awards and honours ==
- 1996 – Silver Ace Award of the Polish Foundation Promotion
- 2009 – Gold Medal for Merit to Culture – Gloria Artis
- 2018 – Wrocław Diamond Prize
- 2018 – Honorary Award of the City of Wrocław
- 2019 – Cultural Award of Silesia (Nagroda Kulturalna Śląska)
