= Nowy Wiśnicz =

Town in Lesser Poland Voivodeship, Poland

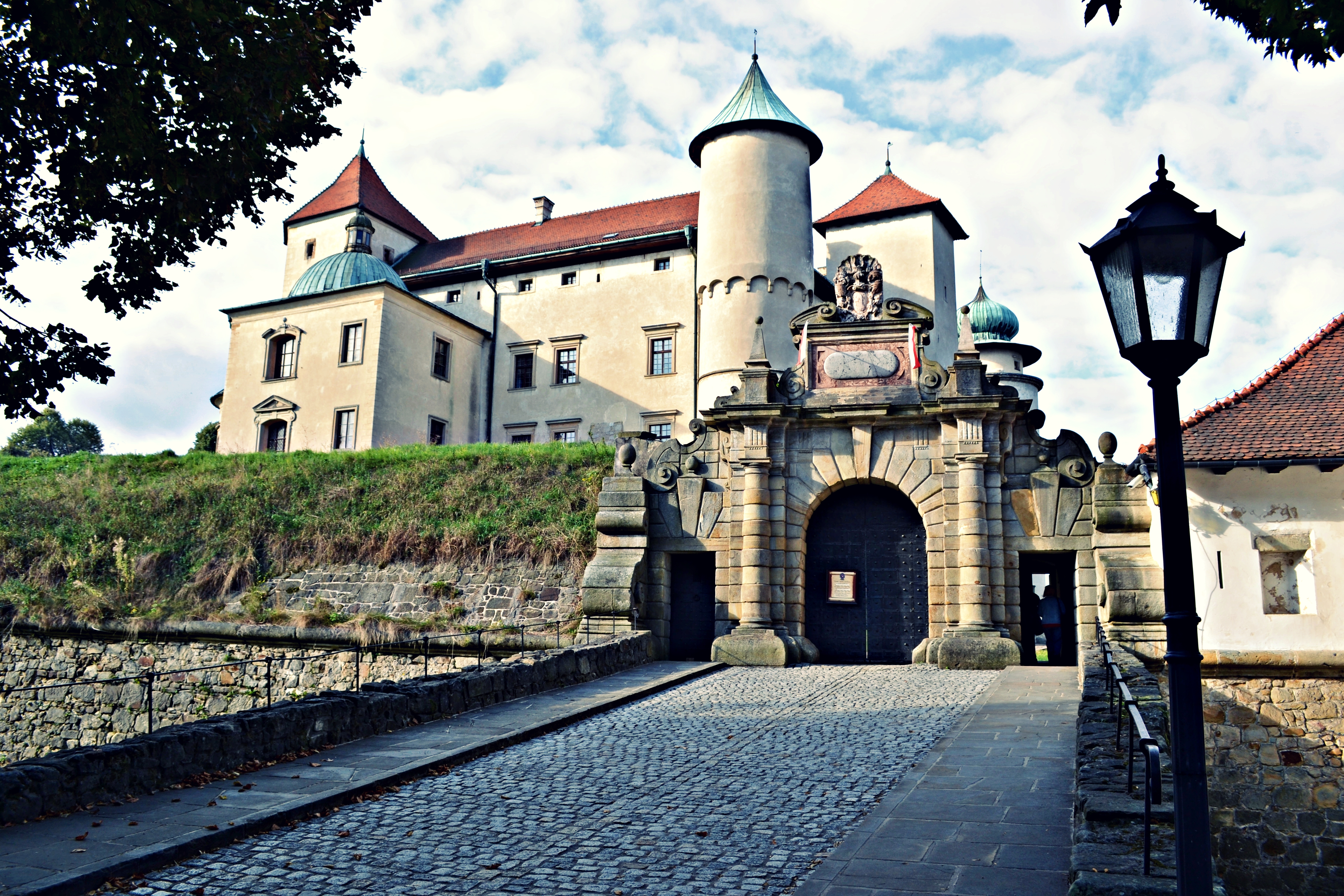
- Nowy Wiśnicz Castle

- Coat of arms

- Location within Poland
- Coordinates: 49°55′N 20°27′E
- Country: Poland
- Voivodeship: Lesser Poland
- County: Bochnia
- Gmina: Nowy Wiśnicz
- Town rights: 1616

Area
  - Total: 5.05 km^{2} (1.95 sq mi)

Population (2019)
  - Total: 2,728
  - Density: 540/km^{2} (1,400/sq mi)
- Time zone: UTC+1 (CET)
  - Summer (DST): UTC+2 (CEST)
- Postal code: 32-720
- Vehicle registration: KBC, KBA

Nowy Wiśnicz [ˈnɔvɨ ˈvʲiɕɲit͡ʂ] (Note: Yiddish: ווישניצא Vishnitsa) is a small town in Bochnia County, Lesser Poland Voivodeship, Poland, with 2,728 inhabitants (2019). Located 4 miles (6 kilometres) south of Bochnia, Nowy Wiśnicz is renowned for its Renaissance-Baroque fortified castle which dominates the skyline.

== History ==
Nowy Wiśnicz was granted town rights in 1616.

Following the German-Soviet invasion of Poland, which started World War II in September 1939, the town was occupied by Germany until 1945. On 7 September 1939, the Germans established a prison for Poles in Nowy Wiśnicz, which first served as a prisoner-of-war camp, then as a forced labour camp, and eventually as a severe prison. On 18 June 1940, the Germans executed 10 Poles near Nowy Wiśnicz as punishment for aiding Jews. On 20 June 1940, one of the first transports of prisoners to the Auschwitz concentration camp departed from the local prison. The Polish resistance was active in the town and area. On 26 July 1944, the Polish Home Army carried out one of the most spectacular operations to storm German prisons in occupied Poland, freeing 128 prisoners and seizing German weapons. On 3 January 1945, the Polish resistance seized an SS supply depot.

== Former structures ==
The Carmelite Church in Nowy Wiśnicz was established by Stanisław Lubomirski, voivode of Kraków to commemorate the victory over the Turks in the Battle of Khotyn (1621). It was constructed according to design by Matteo Trapola between 1631 and 1635. The interior was embellished with profuse early baroque stucco decorations by Giovanni Battista Falconi, frescoes by Mathäus Ingermann of Rome, 8 marble altars with oil paintings by Ingermann and probably by José de Ribera (the founder was a passionate collector of European art). Between 1942 and 1944 the interior was devastated by the Germans and eventually the church had been demolished.

== Notable people ==
- Eugeniusz Molski (born 1942), sculptor
