= Cieśle =

Cieśle may refer to the following places in Poland:

- Cieśle, Lower Silesian Voivodeship (south-west Poland)
- Cieśle, Piotrków County in Łódź Voivodeship (central Poland)
- Cieśle, Wieluń County in Łódź Voivodeship (central Poland)
- Cieśle, Świętokrzyskie Voivodeship (south-central Poland)
- Cieśle, Piaseczno County in Masovian Voivodeship (east-central Poland)
- Cieśle, Gmina Bodzanów in Masovian Voivodeship (east-central Poland)
- Cieśle, Gmina Drobin in Masovian Voivodeship (east-central Poland)
- Cieśle, Oborniki County in Greater Poland Voivodeship (west-central Poland)
- Cieśle, Pleszew County in Greater Poland Voivodeship (west-central Poland)
- Cieśle, Poznań County in Greater Poland Voivodeship (west-central Poland)
