= Eugeniusz Molski =

Polish artist, painter and sculptor

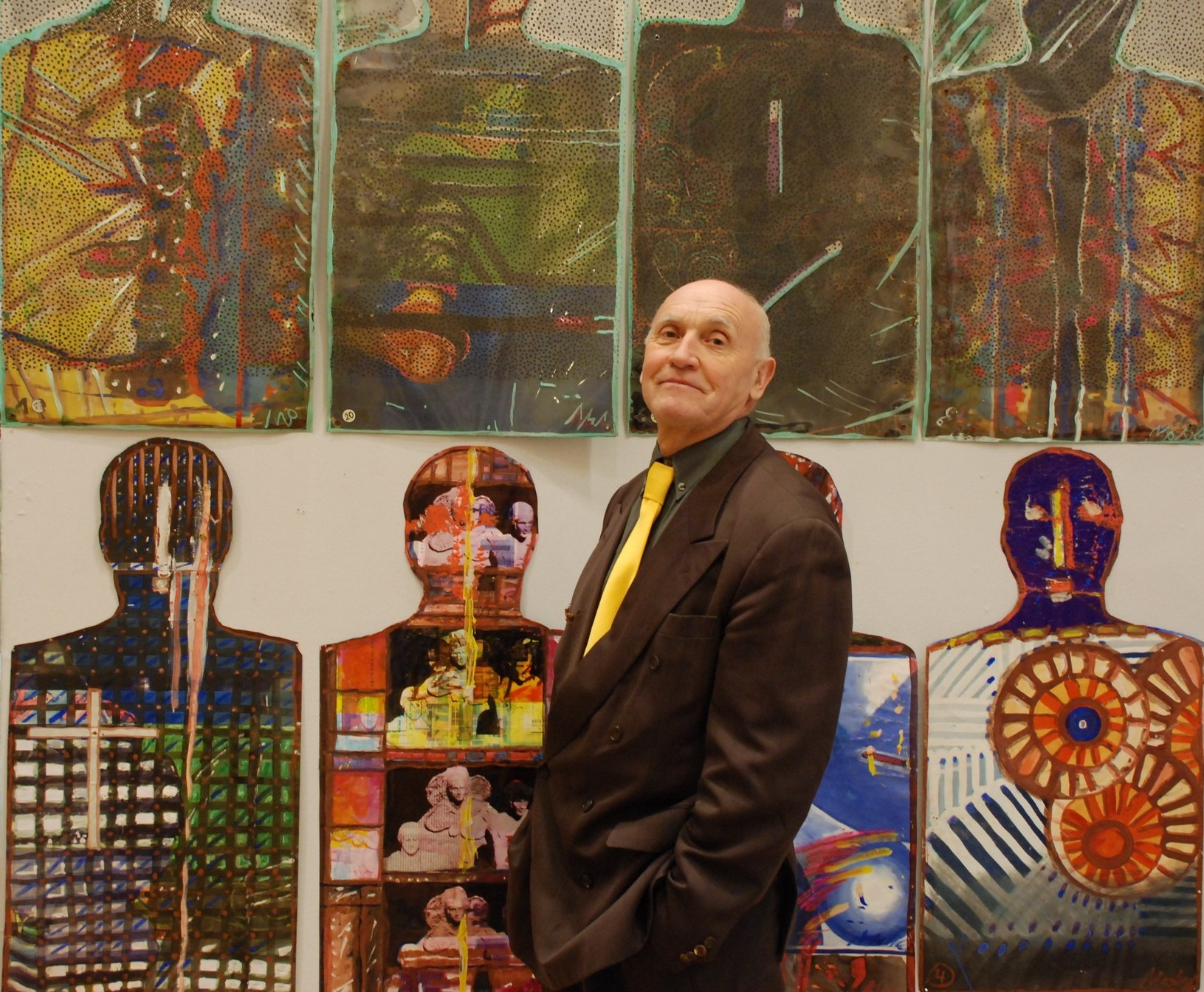
Eugeniusz Molski

Eugeniusz Molski (born in 1942 in Bagienice) is a Polish contemporary artist, painter and sculptor. Attended a State Fine Arts College in Nałęczów and a State Academy of Fine Arts in Wrocław where he obtained his diploma in 1969. He specializes in architectural painting and ceramics. Since 1969 he has been employed at the Fine Arts College in Nowy Wiśnicz. He does mural and easel painting as well as ceramics and sculpture.

== Collective exhibitions abroad ==
- Stockholm /Sweden/, Düsseldorf, Frechen /Germany/ - 1978
- Nuremberg – ceramics, 1981,83,84
- Bratislava – painting 1983
- Kiev – painting 1983
- Faenza (Italy) – international ceramics biennial 1984, 87
- Kecskemét (Hungary) – enamel 1985
- Hradec Králové – ceramics 1988
- Frechen – ceramics 1994–98, 2000–2007
- Erkrath – 1988, 99, 2001 International Art Fair.

== Major individual exhibitions ==
- Wrocław “Pałacyk” Gallery (twice), Gallery of the “Kalambur” Theatre (twice)
- Tarnów: Regional Museum, DK Azoty, PSP Gallery (three times), BWA Gallery “Sztylet”, KIK Gallery “Pod Aniołem”, WBP, MBP, Tarnów Theatre
- Kraków: “Forum” Gallery, City Cultural Center, PSP Gallery, “Cepelia” Gallery
- Słupsk: BWA Gallery
- Dębica: MOK Gallery
- Mielec: DK Gallery
- Toruń: BWA
- Biała Podlaska: BWA Gallery
- Miechów: BWA Gallery
- Bochnia: Public Library, S. Fischer Museum
- Zakopane; Gorlice: Karwacjanow Manor
- Kuopio (Finland): Public Library; Joensuu, Kajaani (Finland): Gallery of the Lutheran Diocese “Dialog”
- Budapest: Polish Culture and Information Center
- Prague (Czech Republic)
- Bratislava; Trencin (Slovakia)
- Myślenice: Museum.

== Works in museum collections ==
- Toruń: Regional Museum
- Bolesławiec: Ceramics Museum
- Tarnów: Regional Museum
- Bochnia: City Museum
- Wałbrzych-Książ: ceramics collection
- Kecskemet (Hungary): Cifra Palota Museum.

== Awards and prizes ==
- 1973 – Toruń, Regional Museum: “Hymn” to Museum collection
- 1977 – Bolesławiec, BOK: award of the Polish Artists’ Association
- 1978 – Kraków, BWA Gallery, Sculpture of the Year for Southern Poland Award; Tarnów, BWA Gallery, Award of the City Mayor; Regional Museum: sculpture “Fazy” /Phases/ to the collection
- 1980-1981- Debrzno – award of the plein-air hosts “Ceramics for Architecture”, awards of the Gdynia Construction Ceramics Company, among others, first prize in a competition for a ceramic wall; Łódź: PAX Gallery, III prize at the exhibition “Sacrum in Contemporary Art”
- 1984 – Rzeszów, KMPiK, distinction in a competition “Rzeszów Old Town”; Książ, Polish Ceramics Biennial, III prize
- 1987 – Kraków BWA Gallery, award at an exhibition of “Craft ‘87”
- 1988 – Kraków, KDK “Pod Baranami” award at a mask competition
- 1989 – Kraków BWA, Grand Prix in a “Primum non nocere” competition; Katowice, BWA, III prize at an exhibition of industrial forms
- 1998 – Kraków, Archdiocese Museum
- 2001 – Bochnia, Fischer Museum (purchase)
- 2003 – Bochnia, Fischer Museum.
