= Mira Żelechower-Aleksiun =

Polish painter (born 1941)

- Born: Mona Janklewicz; 26 March 1941 (age 85); Millerovo, Russia
- Known for: Painting
- Movement: Religious Painting

Mira Żelechower-Aleksiun (born 26 March 1941 in Millerovo) is a Polish painter of Jewish descent.

== Biography ==
She was born in Millerovo, Rostov Oblast, where her parents moved during World War II. Her father was murdered by the Nazis in May 1941. After the war, Mira Żelechower and her mother came back to Poland and settled in Wrocław.

In 1966, she graduated from Eugeniusz Geppert Academy of Fine Arts and one year later, she debuted as a painter at the "Galeria Teatru Kalambur" in Wrocław. In the 1960s and the 1970s, Mira Żelechower-Aleksiun was taking part in the important painters' conferences, including the 4th and 7th Overview of the Polish Contemporary Art in Szczecin, the 8th and 9th Group of Realists' Exhibition in Warsaw and the Jan Spychalski Painting Contest in Poznań.
