= Natalia LL =

Polish artist (1937–2022)

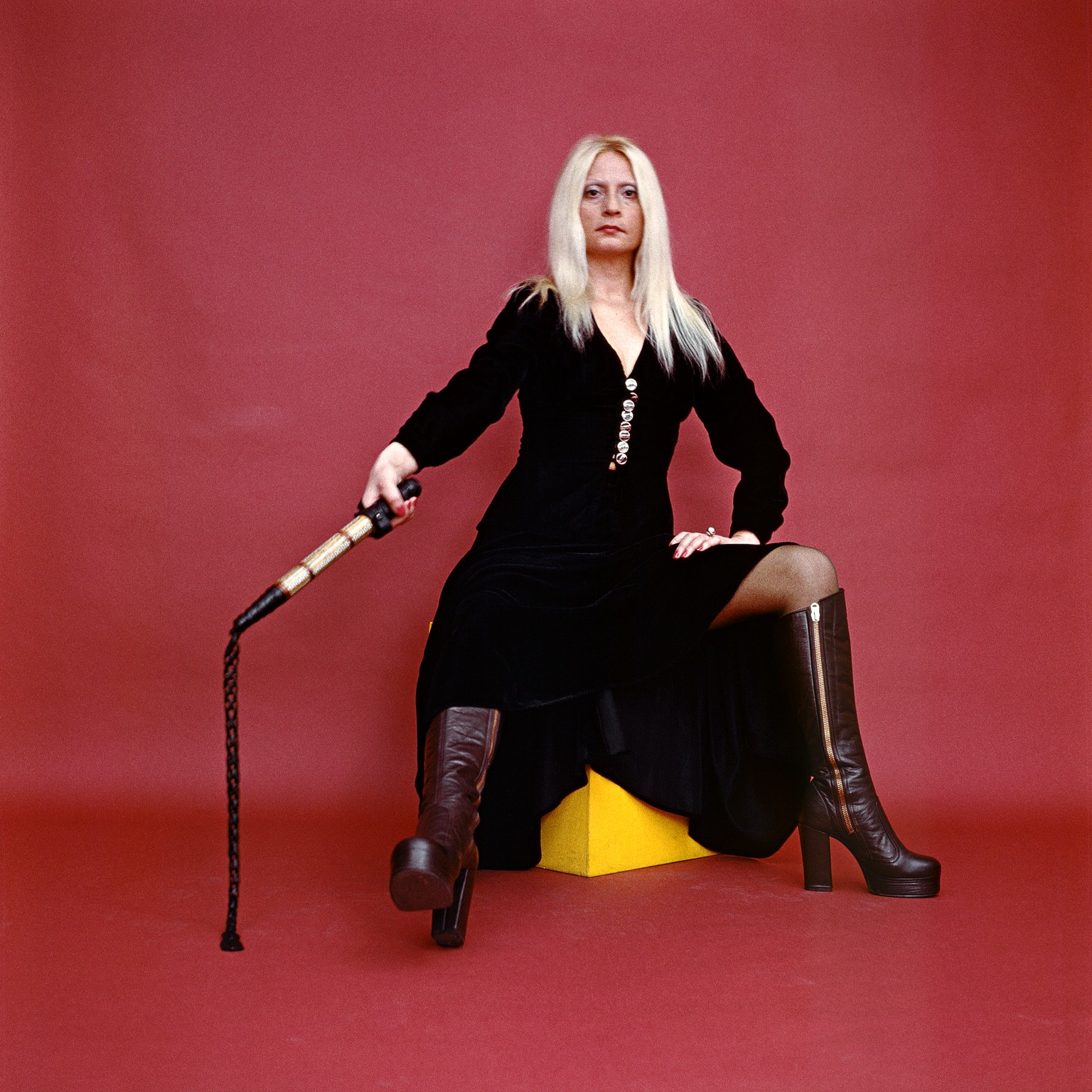
- Natalia in 1970
- Born: Natalia Lach-Lachowicz; 18 April 1937; Żywiec, Poland
- Died: 12 August 2022 (aged 85)
- Education: Academy of Fine Arts, Wrocław
- Known for: Painting, photography, drawing, performance, video art
- Notable work: Consumer art (1972)
- Website: nataliall.com/en/

Natalia Lach-Lachowicz (18 April 1937 – 12 August 2022) was a Polish artist who worked with paint, photography, drawing, performance, and video art. Sean O'Hagan, writing in The Guardian in 2017, described her as "a neglected early-1970s Polish-born pioneer of feminist avant garde image making".

== Early life and education ==
Natalia Lach-Lachowicz was born in Żywiec, Poland. From 1946 to 1956, Lach-Lachowicz lived in Bielsko-Biała where she completed basic and secondary education. From 1957 to 1963 she studied at the State College of Fine Arts (nowadays Eugeniusz Geppert Academy of Fine Arts) in Wrocław under the supervision of Professor S. Dawski, where she completed her MSc. In 1964 she received a Diploma of the Association of Polish Art Photographers (ZPAF).

== Life and work ==
Natalia LL was a conceptual artist and photographer, associated with the avant-garde scene of the 1960s in Poland. Through photography and video she deconstructed single-frame photographs and satirizes the images that were presented in advertising, television, and print in the 1970s and 1980s.

In 1970 she co-founded PERMAFO, an artists' group and gallery, with Zbigniew Dłubak and Andrzej Lachowicz. In 1971, after marrying Lachowicz, she assumed the name Natalia LL. Since 1975 she was engaged in the international feminist art movement and took part in various symposia and exhibitions.

Her series, Consumer Art (1972–1975), depicts close ups of women eating and biting foods like bananas, sausages, and melons. It is often read as a critique, questioning the common representation of women in pornography. She said of it "Feminists saw in my consumer art a perverse struggle with the cult of the phallus and with masculinity. For me it was rather the manifestation of a feeling of life and liveliness."

After suffering from a severe illness in the late 1970s, Natalia LL began to delve into transcendental and mythological subjects, often photographing her performances.

In 2018, the ZW Foundation was founded to preserve the works of Natalia LL as well as to provide a "place for exchanging scientific ideas and creative thoughts".

In April 2019, after an anonymous complaint, the Polish National Museum in Warsaw removed from an exhibition works by Natalia LL, Katarzyna Kozyra, and the duo formed by Karolina Wiktor and Aleksandra Kubiak. This act, which was seen as an act of censorship of feminist art, led to widespread protests; a movement termed "#bananagate."

Between 2004 and 2013 she was a senior lecturer at the University of Fine Arts in Poznań.

She died on 12 August 2022, aged 85.

== Publications ==
- Consumer Art and Beyond. CSW Zamek Ujazdowski, 2016. Edited by Agata Jakubowska. ISBN 978-8365240262. With essays by Anna Markowska, Wojciech Szyma_ski, Ewa Toniak, Monika Bakke, Maja Fowkes, Reuben Fowkes, David Crowley, Eva Badura-Triska and Claudia Calirman.
- The Mysterious World. Verlag fur Moderne Kunst, 2022. ISBN 9783903572133. With essays by Anna Kutaj-Markowska, Marika Kuzmicz, and Zofia Krawiec.

== Awards ==
- Silver Medal, Medal for Merit to Culture – Gloria Artis, from the Ministry of Culture and National Heritage, Poland, 2007

== Exhibitions ==
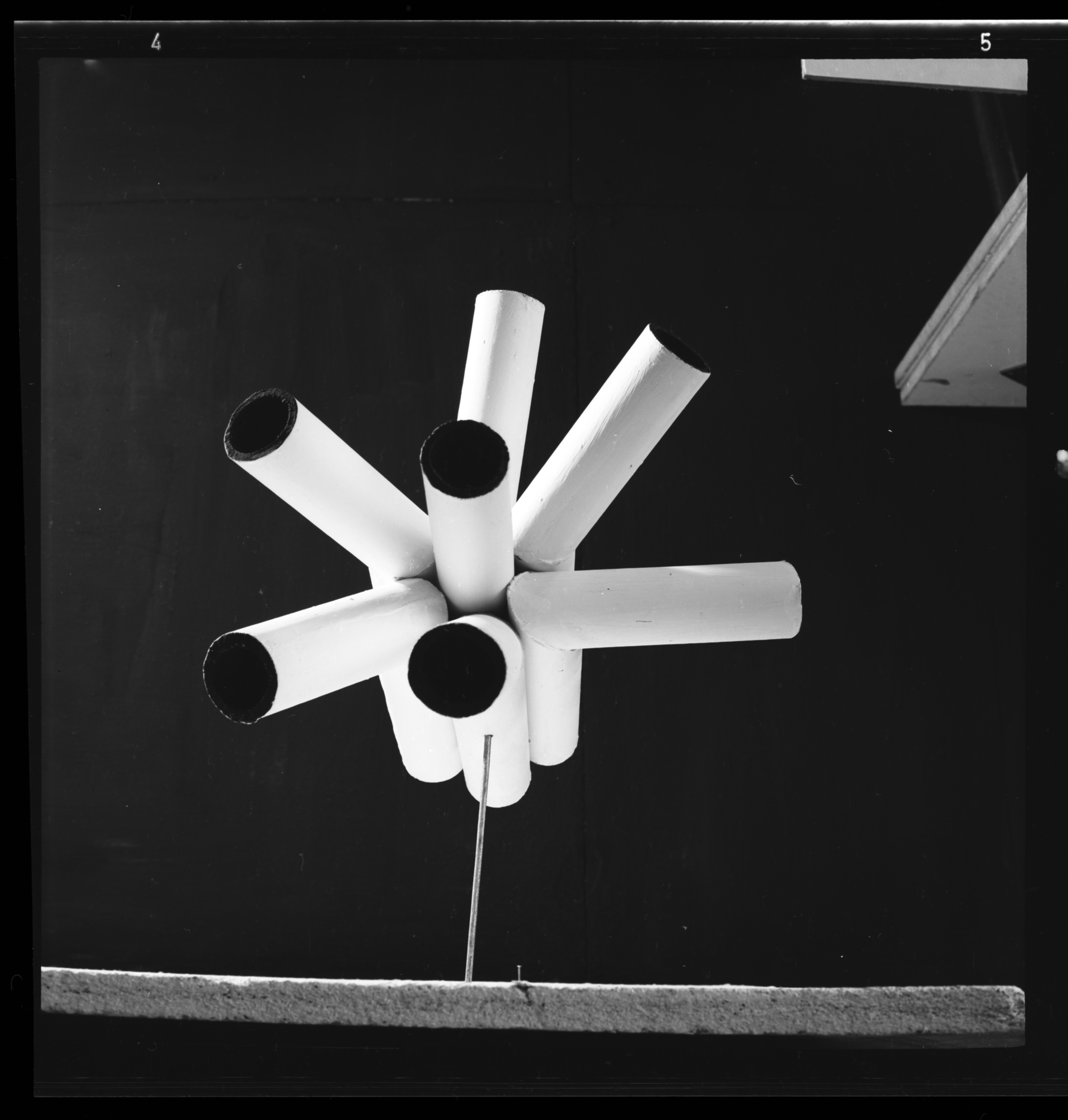
Kompendium, Zbigniew Dłubak, Natalia Lach-Lachowicz, Andrzej Lachowicz, Wrocław Contemporary Museum

=== Solo exhibitions ===
- Piramida/Pyramid, Galeria Spojrzenia, Wrocław, 1980
- Allusive Space, Frauenmuseum, Bonn, 1995
- Ogrody personlizmu/Gardens of Personalism, Centrum Sztuki Współczesnej Zamek Ujazdowski, Warsaw, 1998
- The Whole of the Parts, Galeria Wangarda BWA, Wrocław, 2005
- Natalia LL – Opus Magnum, Ernst Múzeum, Budapest, 2012
- Doing Gender, lokal_30, Warsaw, 2013
- Natalia LL. Intimate Photography, Galerie Steinek, Vienna, 2018
- Natalia LL. The Mysterious World, Francisco Carolinum, 2021

=== Group exhibitions ===
- Bienal de São Paulo, Brazil, 1979
- La photographie polonaise, Centre Georges Pompidou, Paris, 1982
- Darkside - Photographic Desire and Sexuality Photographed, Fotomuseum, Winterthur, 2008
- Rebelle: Art and Feminism 1969–2009, Museum voor Moderne Kunst, Arnhem, Netherlands, 2009
- Gender Check, Femininity and Masculinity in the Art of Eastern Europe, mumok Museum Moderner Kunst – Stiftung Ludwig Vienna & Zachęta National Gallery of Art Warsaw
- Natalia LL, Józef Robakowski, Ewa Juszkiewicz, gallery lokal_30 at Frieze New York City, 2016

== Gallery ==
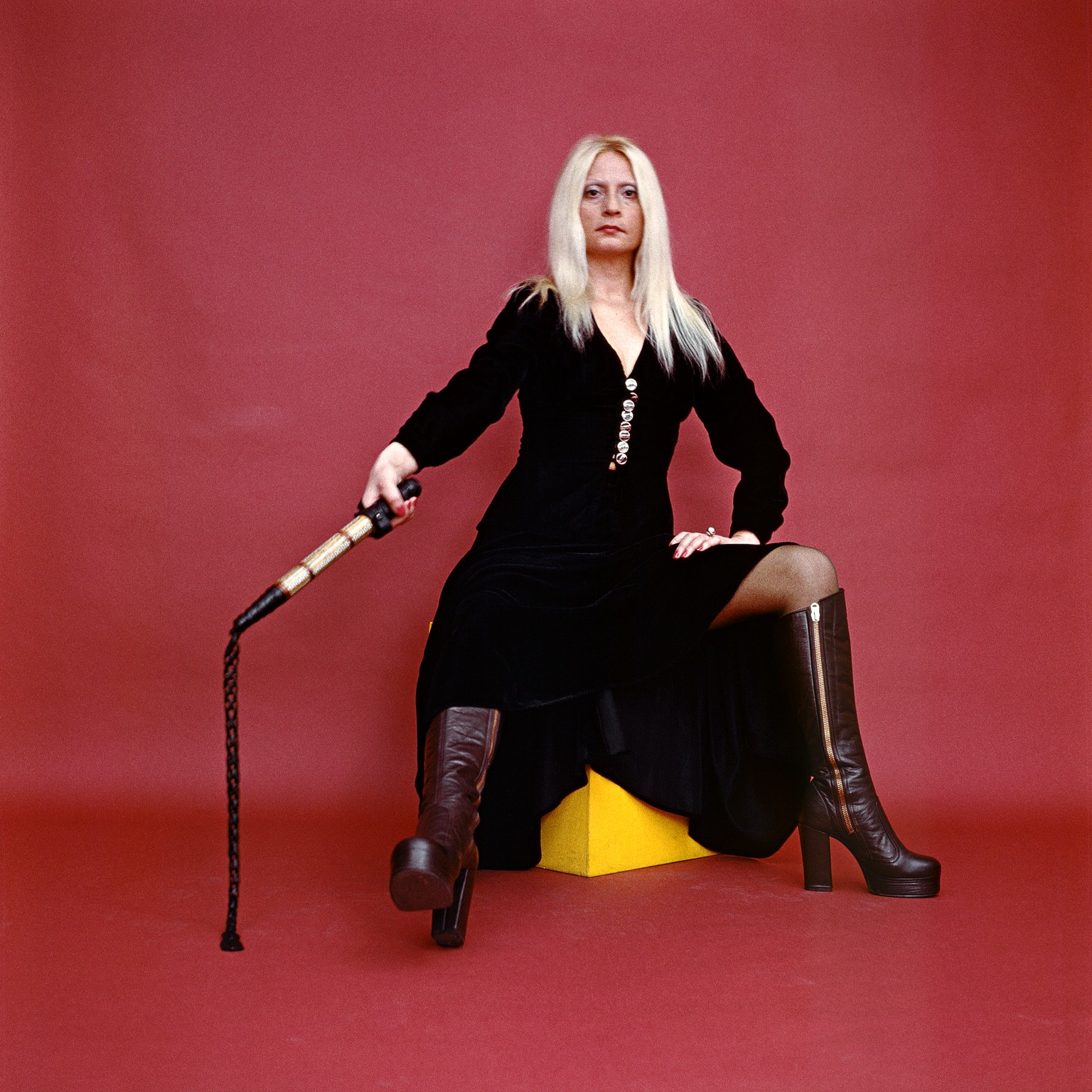
Aksamitny terror, 1970

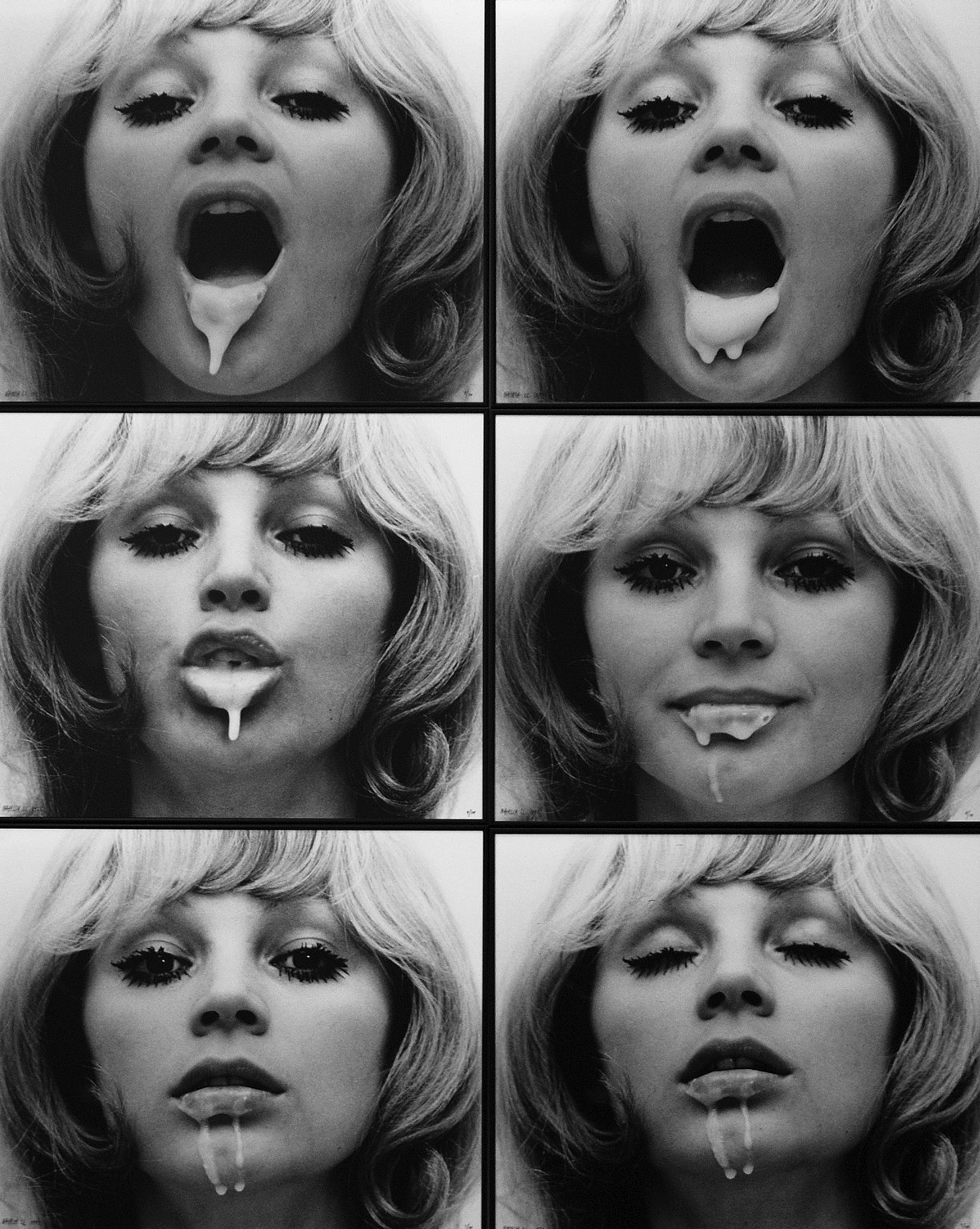
Sztuka Postkonsumpcyjna, 1975

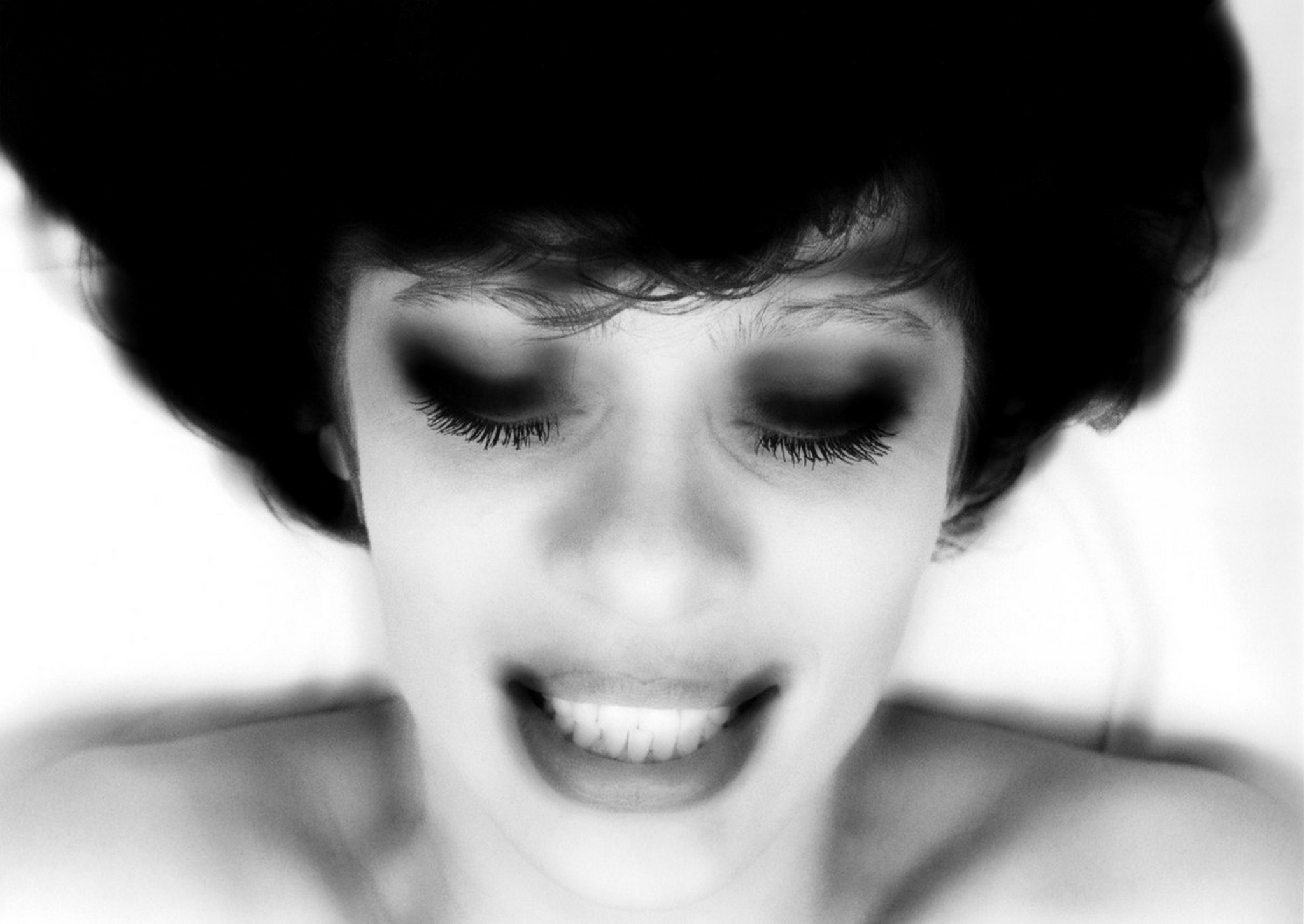
Śnienie, 1978

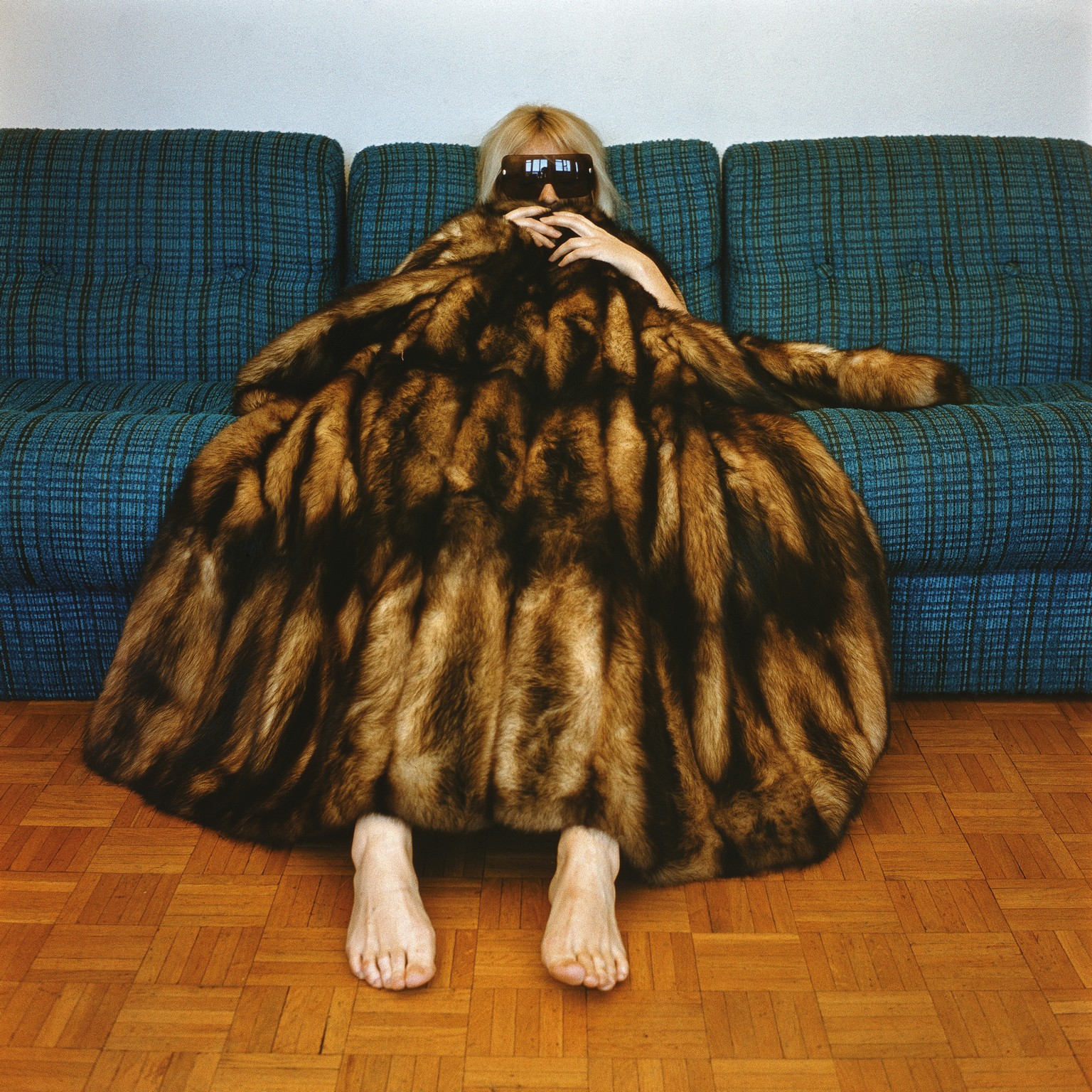
Sztuka zwierzęca / Animal Art, 1978

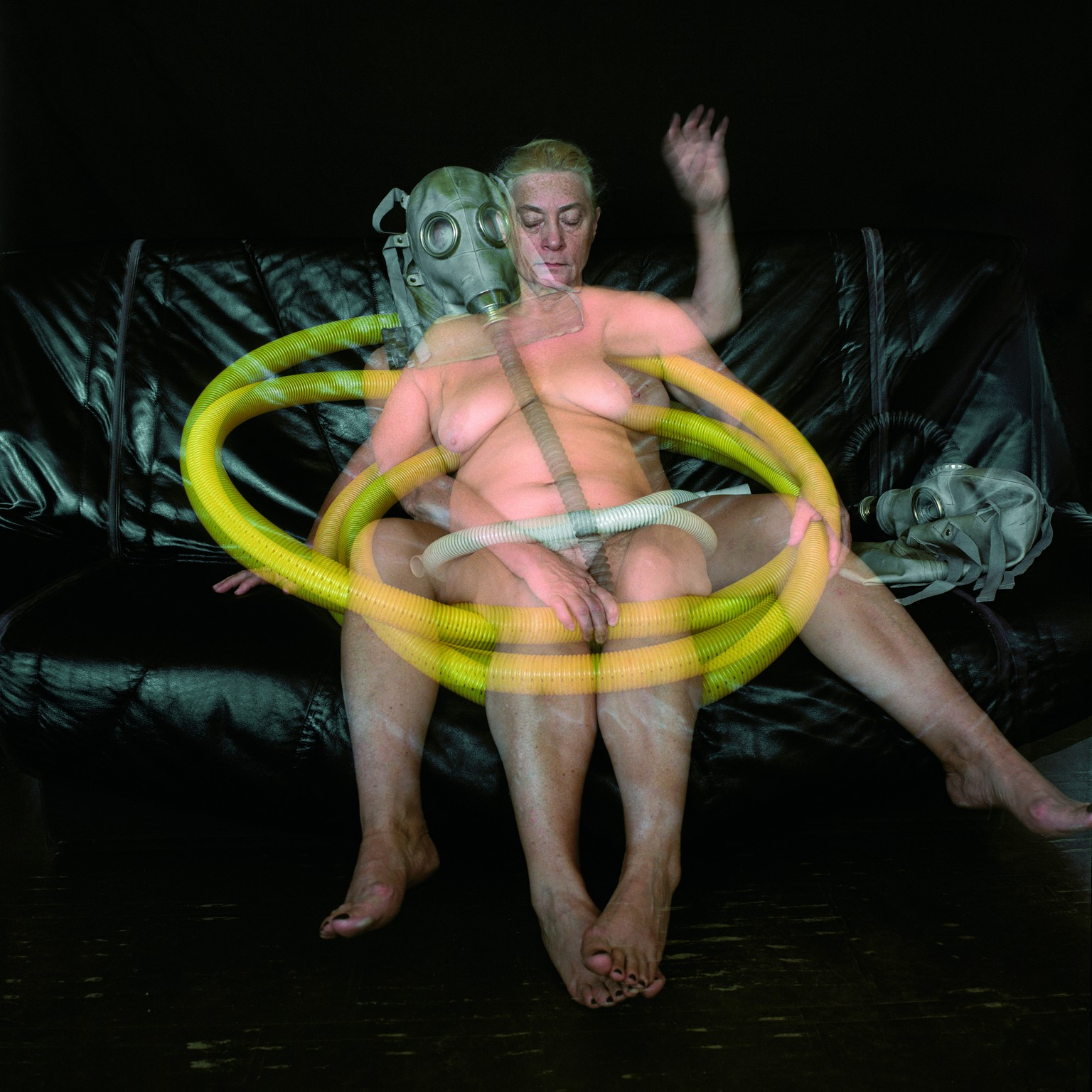
Erotyzm trwogi, 2004

== General references ==
- Altmann, Susanne; Wagner, Hilke; Lozo, Katarina, eds. (2019). Medea muckt auf: Radikale Künstlerinnen hinter dem Eisernen Vorhang [The Medea Insurrection: Radical Women Artists Behind the Iron Curtain]. Cologne: Walther König. ISBN 978-3-96098-527-3. OCLC 1099843511.
