= Zbigniew Kupczynski =

Canadian painter (1928–2024)

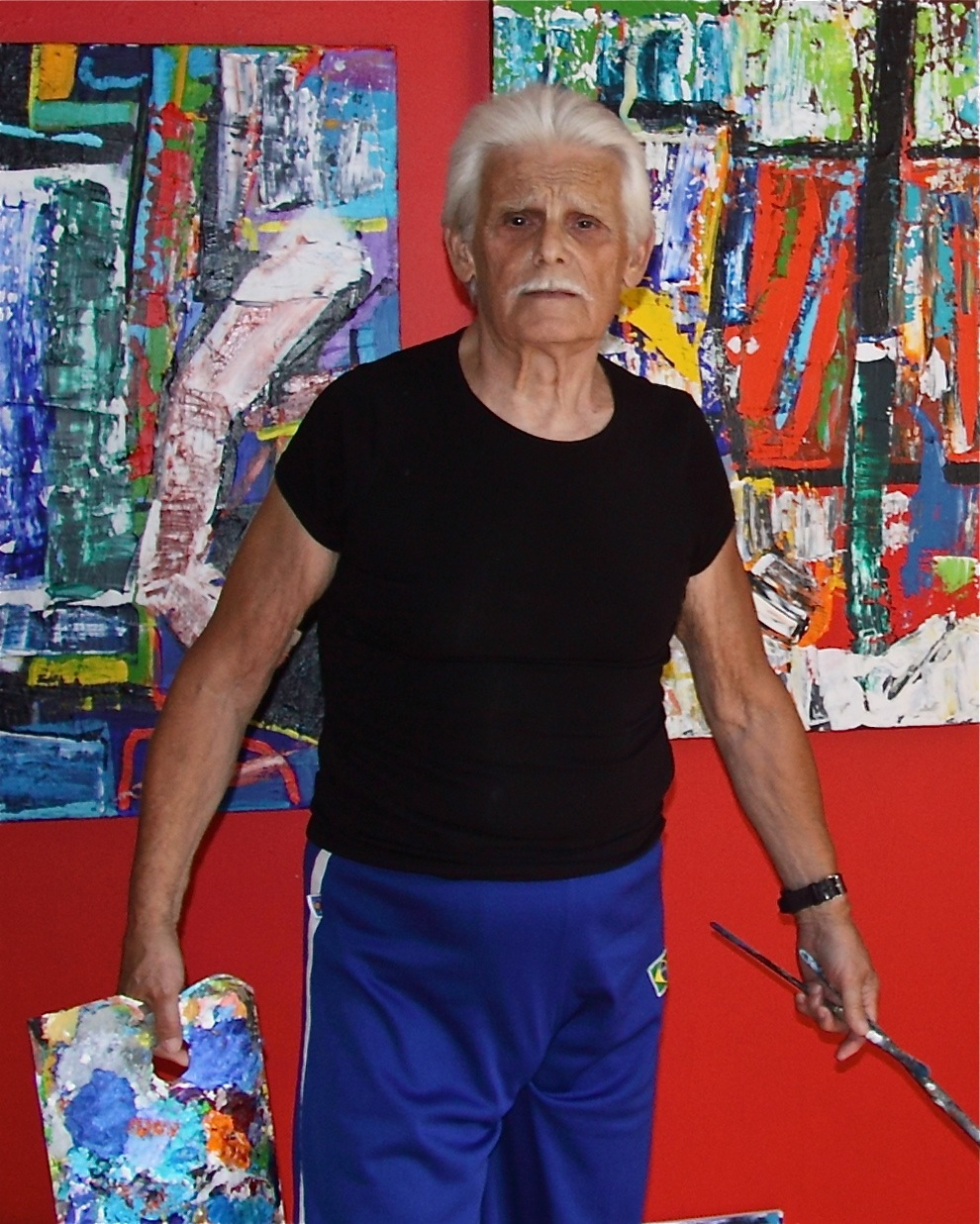
- Kupczynski in 2010
- Born: 28 November 1928; Wilno, Poland
- Died: 18 February 2024 (aged 95); Vancouver, British Columbia, Canada
- Education: Academy of Fine Arts
- Known for: Painter
- Notable work: Pavarotti, The Piano Player, Girl with Green Apples, Concert, Music in the Mountains, The Skier
- Movement: Abstract Expressionism, Abstract art, Portrait Painting
- Spouse: Eva Kupczynski (m. 1963)

Zbigniew Kupczynski (28 November 1928 – 18 February 2024) was a Polish-Canadian abstract expressionist artist known for his colorful portrait paintings of celebrities and children. His work has been the subject of hundreds of exhibitions throughout Europe, North America, Australia and Japan since the 1950s. Today, Kupczynski's works are held in private and corporate collections worldwide, including the estates of former US President Richard Nixon and Pope John Paul II.

== Life ==
Kupczynski was born in Wilno, Poland, the only child of an officer in the Polish army. He started drawing with crayons as a child and was introduced to painting by his father. At the age of 11, Kupczynski escaped to Warsaw with his mother during the Soviet invasion of Poland, while his father went to the United Kingdom to aid in the war effort.

While Kupczynski is known for his abstract and figurative works, he has experimented with a wide range of mediums. In the 1950s and 1960s, his paintings were predominantly oils on canvas. In the late 1960s, he experimented with metal compositions, which were exhibited in Poland, Sweden and Denmark. Acrylic paint has been his preferred medium since the 1970s, when he immigrated to Canada.

Described as "one of the wild boys of Polish art" by Harold Schonberg of The New York Times, many of Kupczynski's portrait paintings are characterised by his unique personal style, use of bright colors on canvas, and trademark mini-scenes on the accentuated noses of his subjects.

== Career ==
In 1946, Kupczynski moved to Wrocław to receive formal training at the Academy of Fine Arts. In 1952, Kupczynski became a member of The Association of Polish Artists, but the country's socialist realism policy barred his work from exhibition due to his tendencies towards expressionism and semi-abstract art.

A change in Poland's government in the mid-1950s precipitated new trends in abstract expressionism and rising interest in Kupczynski's work. In 1956, French artist Andre Pignon visited Kupczynski in Warsaw and was appalled by his living and working conditions. Pignon's intervention resulted in the Ministry of Arts and Culture in Poland allocating a studio to Kupczynski.

By the late 1950s, Kupczynski had attracted the attention of both Polish and Western critics, and he was featured in various publications, including Tygodnik, Stolica, Przeglad Kulturalny, Wspolczesnosc, Po Prostu, Munchen Merkur, and Tagebuch. He was one of three artists featured in a documentary by The National Film Board in Poland, and he was awarded a government grant that enabled him to continue training in Paris. This led to an exclusive contract with the Galerie André Schoeller and further exhibitions in Poland, France, Austria, Switzerland, and the United States. In 1959, while on a trip to Warsaw, then-United States Vice President Richard Nixon purchased one of his paintings.

By the early 1960s, Kupczynski had been commissioned to paint the interior of a church in Kiełpino, Poland, as well as a mural in Oświęcim, Poland. He had exhibited works in both the United States and Europe, including a one-man show at the Miami Museum of Modern Art. In 1962, Kupczynski initiated the first outdoor modern art exhibition in Warsaw on the walls of Barbican in Kraków, evoking provocative cultural and political dialogue between artists and the hostile communist regime.

In 1963, Kupczynski's art was included in an exhibition at the Philadelphia Museum of Art alongside the works of Picasso, Georges Braque, Joan Miró, Marc Chagall, and Paul Klee. In 1964, Polish composer Tadeusz Baird chose Kupczynski's artwork for the album cover of Modern Music Tastes.

In 1966, Kupczynski was included in Germany's most prestigious art encyclopedia, Thieme-Becker, and the world's largest contemporary art exhibition, the Kassel documenta, as well as the Repertorium Artis.

In 1980, with his wife (tapestry artist Eva Kupczynski), Kupczynski opened the Kupczynski Studio Gallery in Vancouver. Kupczynski devoted much of the 1980s to commissioned work, including posters for the Vancouver Opera, a ceramic mural for British Columbia's Children's Hospital, and a poster entitled Pax in Terra to commemorate Pope John Paul II's visit to Canada.

Kupczynski has been featured in many art shows in Canada and has had numerous exhibitions abroad, at the Drian Galleries in London, UK, the Art Emporium Gallery in Seattle, the Carimor Gallery in New York, and the Bancho Gallery and Atagoyama Gallery in Tokyo.

In 2001 he returned to Poland for two exhibitions, in the Art and Forma Gallery and the Gallery of the President in Warsaw. In 2002, another exhibition of his work was held at the Historical Museum of Warsaw, and in 2007 at the Polonia House, Kraków, Poland.

Kupczynski has written and been the subject of several books, including Journey to the Red Desert, Three Hundred Years Of Kupczynski, Art Warrior and the ebook The Worlds of Kupczynski.

In 2020, Kupcyznski was featured in the documentary "The Painter from Nowhere" by Christian Trineer. Kupczynski died on 18 February 2024, at the age of 95.
