= Lanchyn settlement hromada =

Settlement hromada of Ivano-Frankivsk Oblast, Ukraine

Lanchyn settlement hromada Ланчинська селищна громада
- Hromada
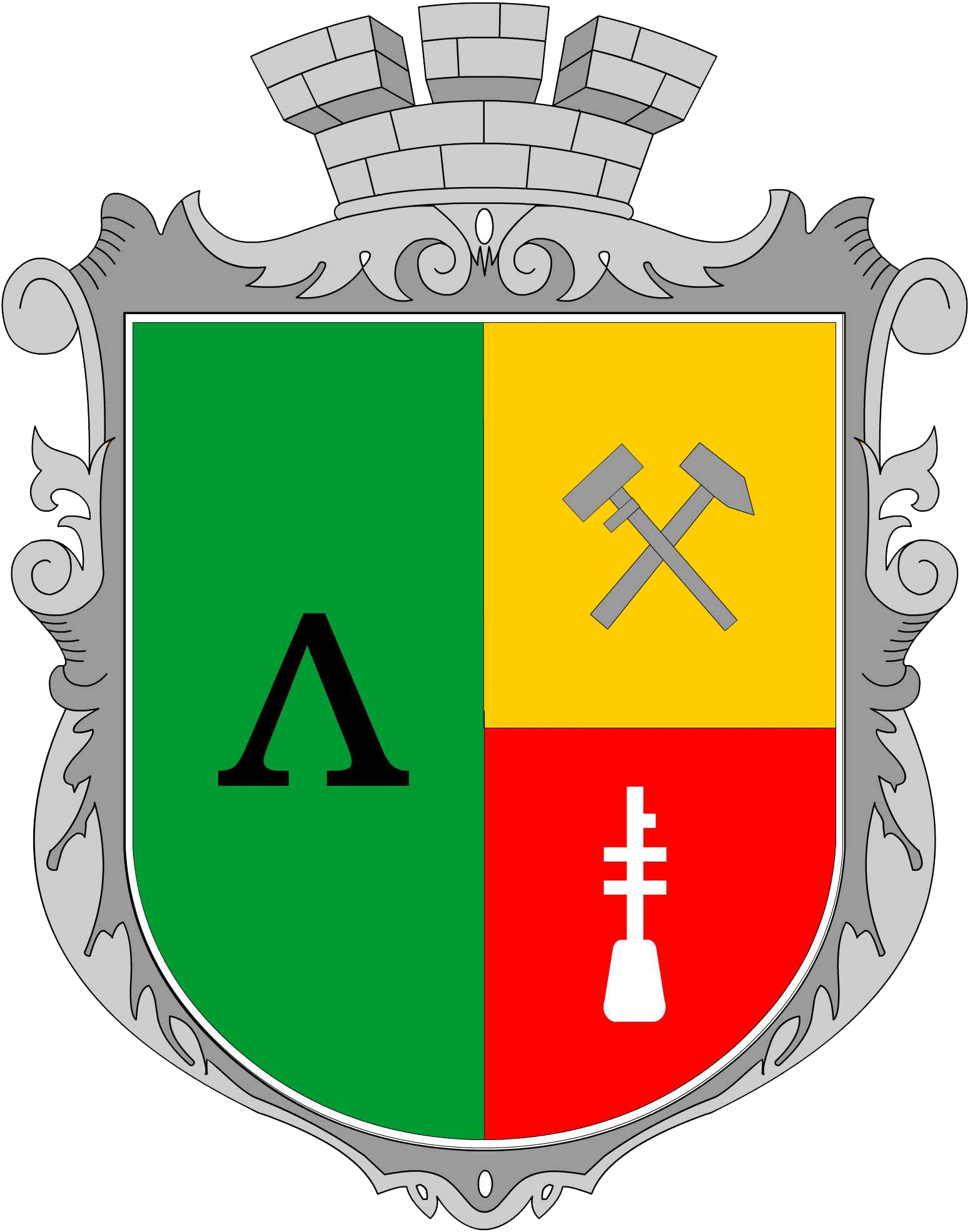
- Seal
- Interactive map of Lanchyn settlement hromada
- Country: Ukraine
- Oblast: Ivano-Frankivsk
- Raion: Nadvirna

Area
  - Total: 84.5 km^{2} (32.6 sq mi)

Population (2023)
  - Total: 11,920
  - Density: 141/km^{2} (365/sq mi)
- Settlements: 5
- Villages: 4
- Towns: 1
- Website: lanchynska-gromada.gov.ua

Lanchyn settlement territorial hromada (Ukrainian: Ланчинська селищна територіальна громада, romanized: Lanchynska selyshchna terytorialna hromada) is one of the hromadas of Ukraine, in Nadvirna Raion within Ivano-Frankivsk Oblast. Its administrative centre is the urban-type settlement of Lanchyn.

The hromada has a total area of 84.5 km^{2} (32.6 mi^{2}), as well as a population of 11,920 (as of 2023).

Prior to its current form, Lanchyn settlement hromada was established as an amalgamated hromada on 29 October 2017. It was expanded to its current form as part of decentralisation in Ukraine.

== Composition ==
In addition to one urban-type settlement (Lanchyn), the hromada contains four villages:

- Dobrotiv
- Hlynky
- Serednii Maidan
- Vyshnivtsi
