= Lanchyn =

Rural locality in Ivano-Frankivsk Oblast, Ukraine

Lanchyn Ланчин Łanczyn
- Rural settlement
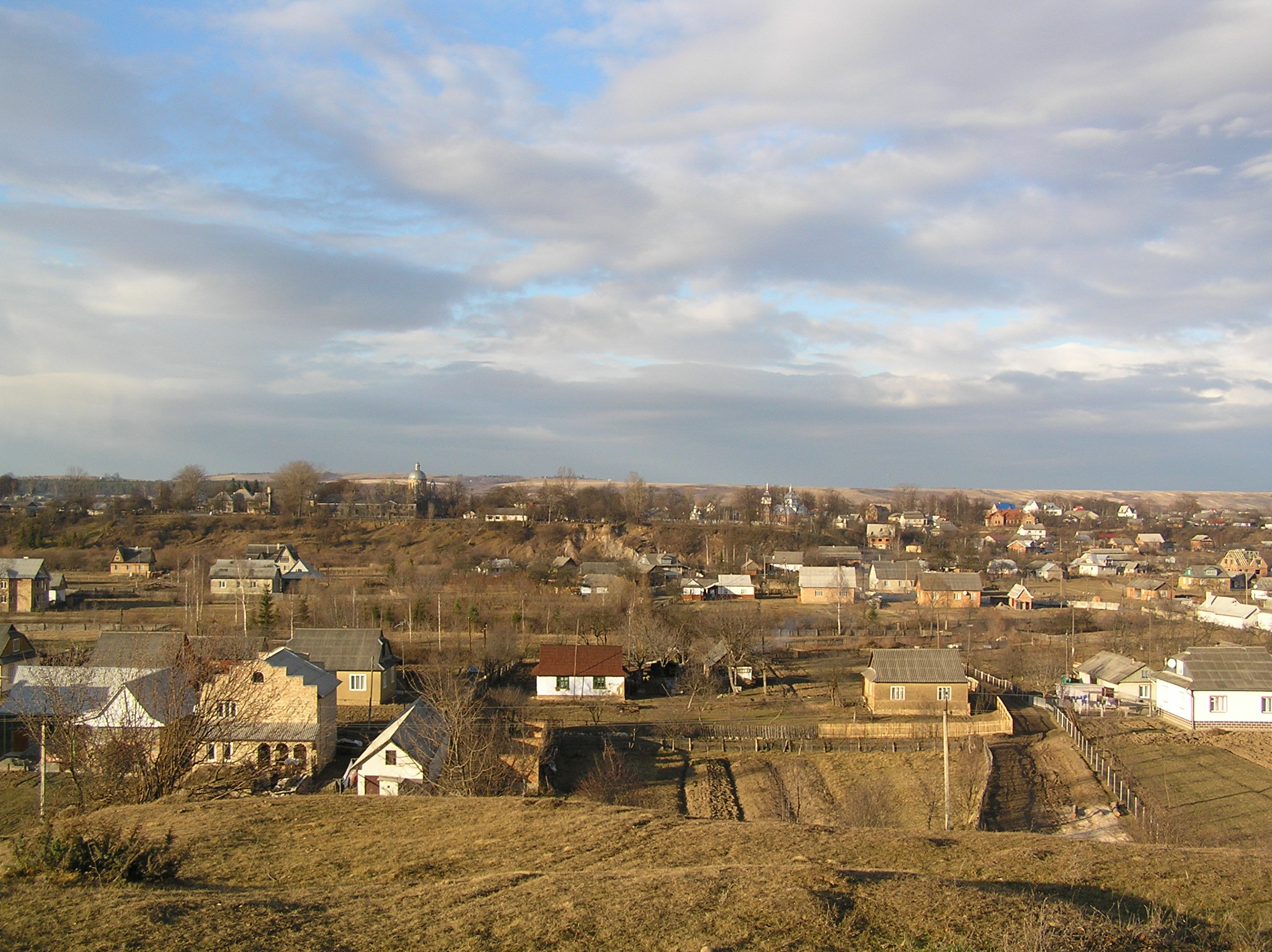

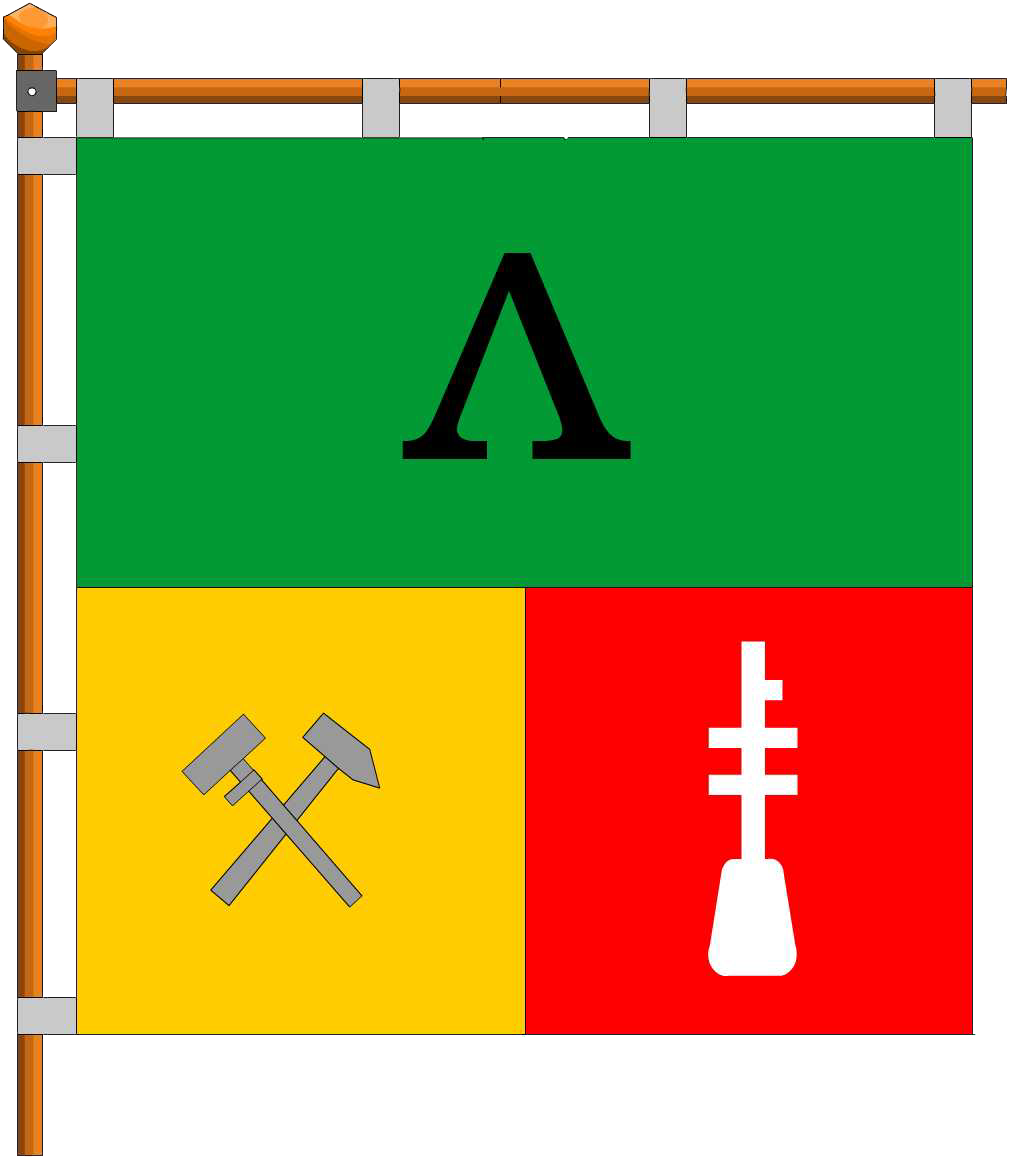
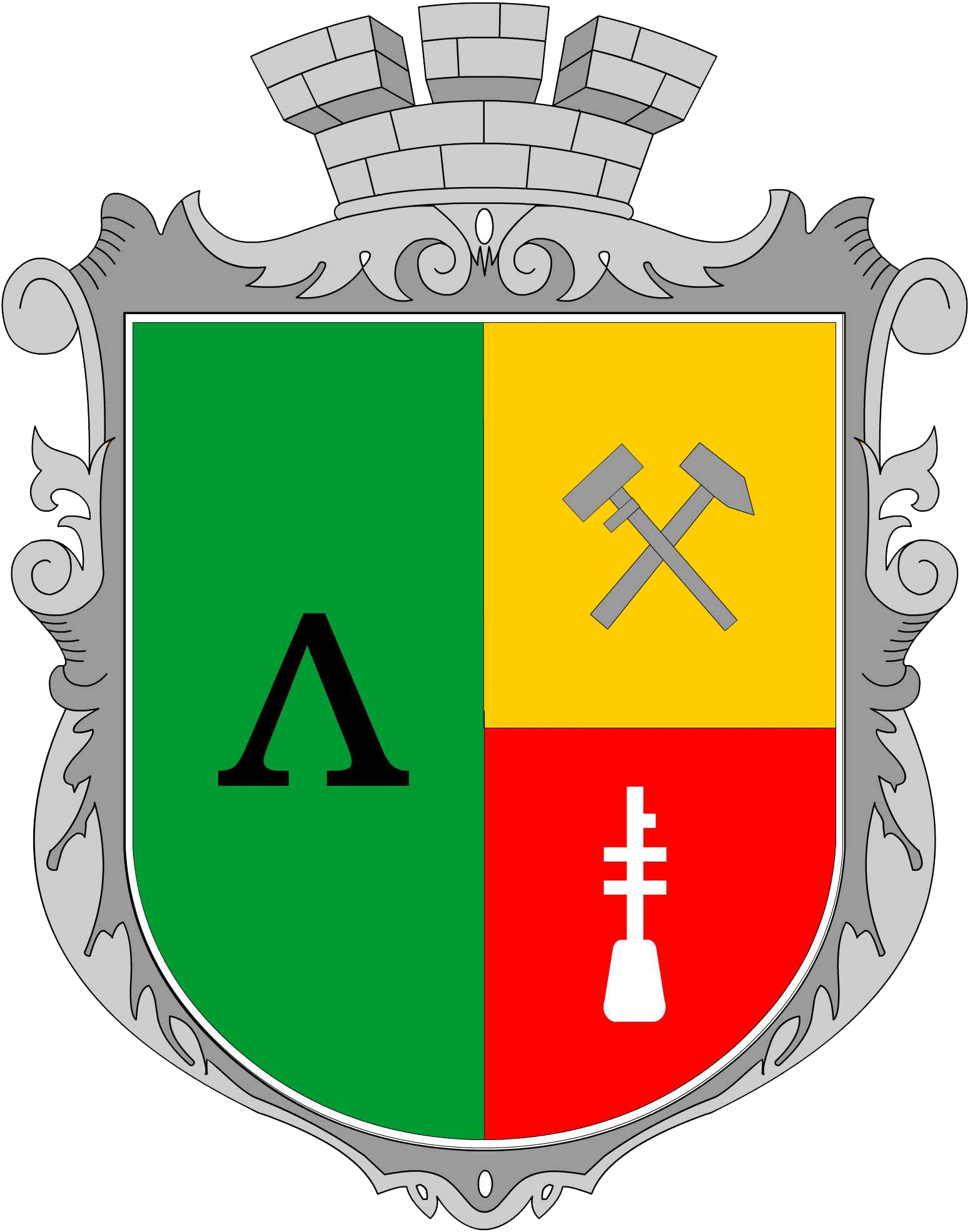
- Flag Coat of arms

- Location within Ivano-Frankivsk Oblast Location within Ukraine
- Coordinates: 48°32′51″N 24°45′6″E
- Country: Ukraine
- Oblast: Ivano-Frankivsk Oblast
- Raion: Nadvirna Raion
- Established: 1050

Government
  - Head of Village Council: Mykhaylo Mykhaylovych Ivanyuk

Area
  - Total: 27.89 km^{2} (10.77 sq mi)

Population (2022)
  - Total: 7,846
  - Density: 281.3/km^{2} (728.6/sq mi)
- Postal code: 78455
- Area code: (+380) 3475

Lanchyn (Ukrainian: Ланчин; Polish: Łanczyn; Hebrew: לאנצ'ין; Romanian: Lanciîn) is a rural settlement in Nadvirna Raion, Ivano-Frankivsk Oblast, Ukraine. It hosts the administration of Lanchyn settlement hromada, one of the hromadas of Ukraine. Its population was 7,846 (2022 estimate).

== Location ==
Lanchyn is located on the Prut about 42 kilometers south of Ivano-Frankivsk and 16 kilometers southeast of Nadvirna.

== History ==
Łanczyn, as it was known in Polish, formed part of the Kingdom of Poland until the First Partition of Poland, when it was annexed by Austria. It was part of Austrian Galicia or Austrian Poland until 1918. After the end of World War I Łanczyn became again part of Poland, within which it was administratively located in the Nadwórna County in the Stanisławów Voivodeship.

Following the joint German-Soviet invasion of Poland, which started World War II in September 1939, Łanczyn was first occupied by the Soviet Union. In 1940 it became an urban-type settlement. From 1941 to 1944, it was occupied by Nazi Germany and administered within the District of Galicia. In 1944, it was re-occupied by the Soviet Union, and eventually annexed from Poland in 1945. In 1945–1947, expelled Poles from Lanchyn settled in the villages of Błażejów and Olszyny.

Postwar, Lanchyn was briefly the center of the raion.

Until 26 January 2024, Lanchyn was designated urban-type settlement. On this day, a new law entered into force which abolished this status, and Lanchyn became a rural settlement.

== Notable people ==
- Zbigniew Horbowy (1935–2019), Polish glass artist
- Mykhajlo Levitsky (1774–1858), Metropolitan of Lviv
