= Maciej Szymon Cieśla =

Polish artist and designer

- Born: 29 June 1989; Katowice, Poland
- Died: 2 July 2016 (aged 27)
- Resting place: Cemetery on Józefowska street, Katowice, Poland; 50.276667°N 19.015833°E
- Education: Jan Matejko Academy of Fine Arts, Kraków, Poland
- Known for: digital art
- Notable work: World Youth Day 2016 Kraków decoration design
- Website: mscstudio.pl

Maciej Szymon Cieśla (29 June 1989 – 2 July 2016) was a Polish artist, graphics designer and visual communication designer. He was responsible for visual design of World Youth Day 2016.

== Biography ==
Cieśla was born in Katowice in 1989. He graduated from Jan Matejko Academy of Fine Arts, specifically Faculty of Art Conservation and Faculty of Industrial Design. In September 2014 he began working in World Youth Day 2016 organisation committee, and from December 2014 he started as full-time volunteer in the graphics design department. He designed all chasubles and computer animations for World Youth Day 2016. He was also responsible for drafting the Cracow decoration project. In November 2015 he was diagnosed with bone cancer. Despite chemotherapy, he continued working until his death on 2 July 2016. He was buried on the cemetery at Józefowska street in Katowice. On 27 July 2016 Pope Francis mentioned Maciej Cieśla and his contribution while preaching from the papal window. On 31 July 2016, during the meeting with World Youth Day volunteers which marked the end of Francis’ visit in Poland, Maciej Cieśla's letter to the Pope and pilgrims was read.

== Awards and distinctions ==
- 2012 Nagroda Województwa Małopolskiego „ARS QUAERENDI” (Małopolskie Voivodship Award „ARS QUAERENDI”)
- 2012 Nagroda Ministra Kultury i Dziedzictwa Narodowego za wybitne osiągnięcia dla studentów uczelni artystycznych (Ministry of Culture and National Heritage Award for outstanding achievements for students of art schools)

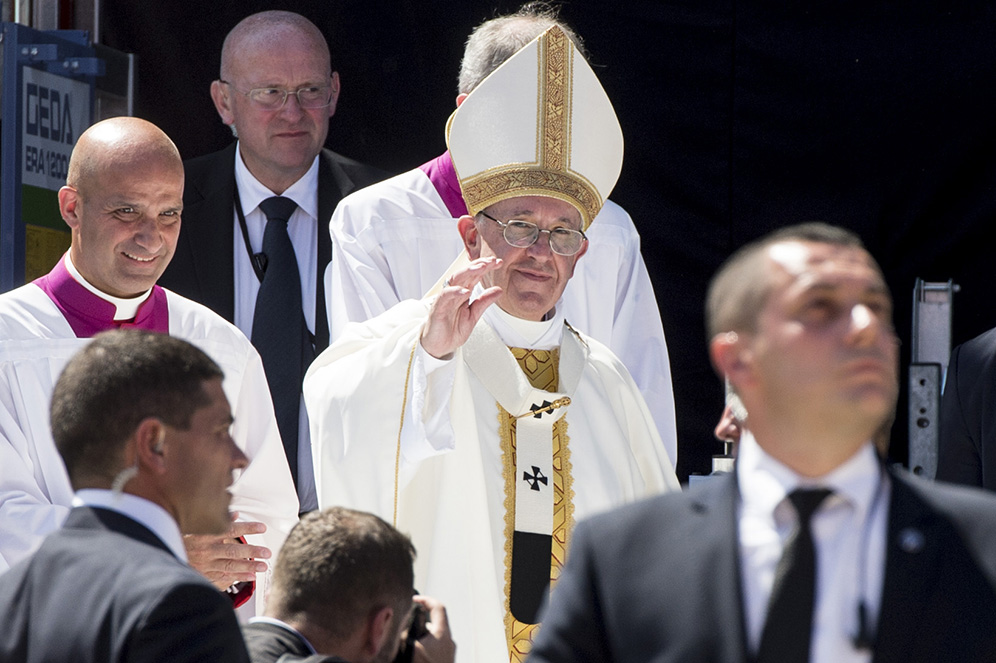
Pope Francis wearing chasuble designed by Maciej Szymon Cieśla
