= Guy Smith (writer) =

American novelist

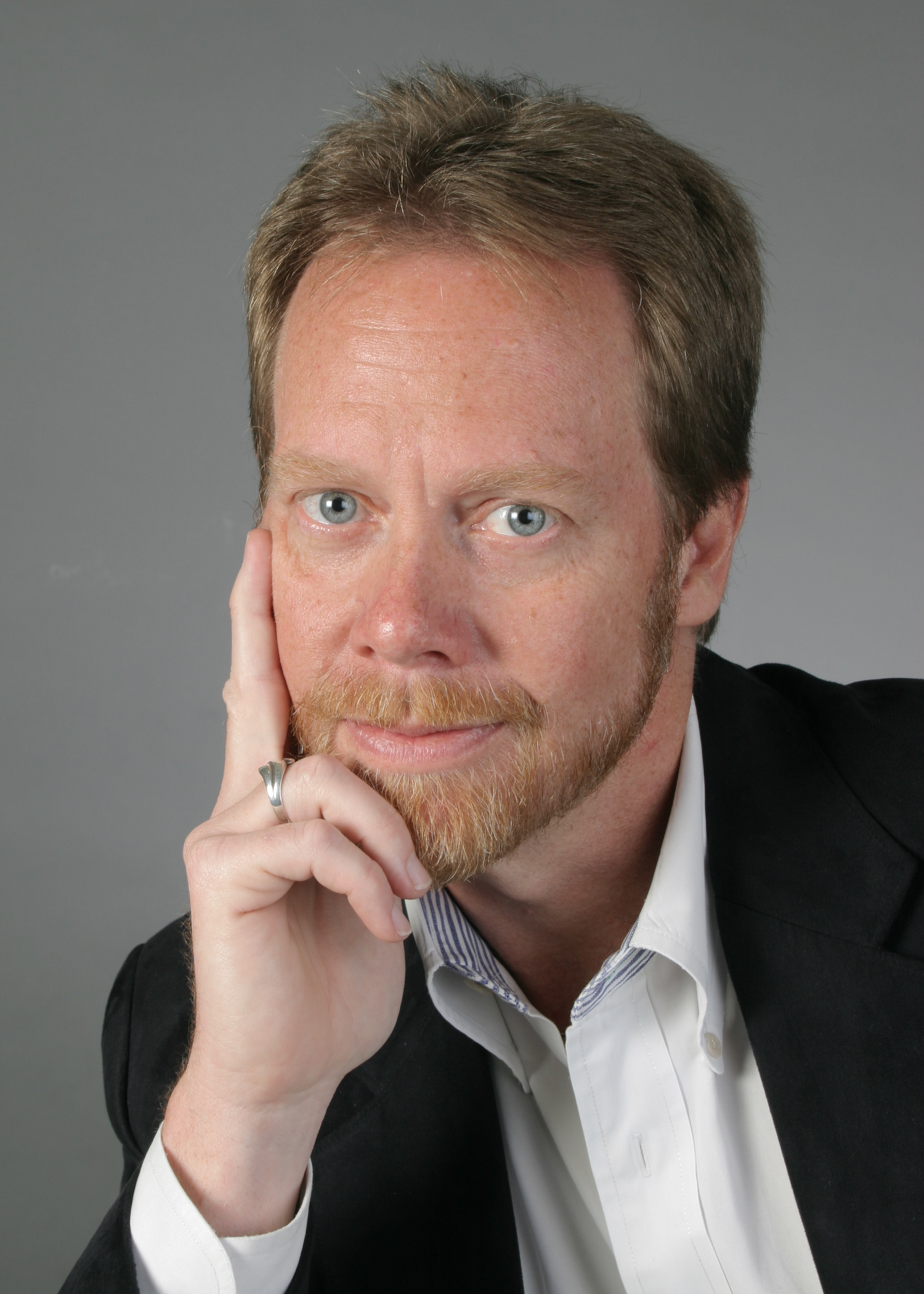
- Guy Smith, 2006
- Born: November 17, 1957 (age 68); Augusta, Georgia, U.S.
- Occupation: Writer
- Writing career
- Genres: Fiction, Non-fiction (political)
- Website: music.guysmith.org

Guy Smith (born November 17, 1957, in Augusta, Georgia) is a writer and songwriter. Smith has published both fiction and non-fiction, and bills himself as a "writer, songwriter, and provocateur."

Smith describes a childhood that included simultaneously being a surfer and a working cowboy. His writing career began while working at Kennedy Space Center, writing articles for trade press. This led to his first book devoted to architecture of the Hewlett-Packard 3000 computer.

In San Francisco Smith began writing politically focused opinion pieces for Bay Area newspapers (San Francisco Chronicle, Oakland Tribune, Contra Costa Times). While in San Francisco he expanded into fiction, publishing his first novella (Afterlife). His speaking engagements include the Libertarian National Convention and the Gun Rights Policy Conference.

In the music field, he has recorded, produced and contributed to compilation albums. In 2024, in response to the Hurricane Helene disaster in Asheville, North Carolina, he organized and produced The Flood: Music for MANNA, released in 2025, to benefit the local MANNA FoodBank.

== Books published ==
- Guns and Control (2020, Skyhorse): ISBN 978-1510760073
- Shooting the Bull (2011, Free Thinkers Media): ISBN 978-0-9832407-0-9
- Afterlife (2009, G3 Media) ISBN 978-1-4392-3743-4
- Gun Facts (1999–2015)
- The HP3000 Bible (1988, PCI Press)

== Political observations ==
=== Media and Social Media ===
In Shooting The Bull, Smith claims that a critical shift in political information has occurred. He notes that traditional media sources (or mainstream media) are no longer in control of the national conversation – that analysis and decisions concerning political “facts” and policy are now in the hands of the citizen media.

“When a few million intelligent but bored individuals are given a unified platform for research, analysis and sharing, power shifts from the organized Fourth Estate to the unorganized Fifth.”

Smith concludes that even though the citizen media produces misinformation, it has disabled centralized or institutionalized misinformation due to ongoing public propaganda analysis.

=== "Smith Doctrine" ===
Smith has articulated a "long view" doctrine for American Foreign policy. The doctrine ties U.S. economic engagement to the civil and human rights records of the partner country. The anticipated effect is that economic vitality will be limited to nations with strong civil and human rights records.

== Discography ==
Just Pluckin' Around (San Francisco Songwriters Cult 2012)

- Released: 2012
- Tracks: Rains Rust, Too Far Away, One Heartbreak

Ghosts in the Bone

- Released: 2018
- Tracks: Old Wounded and Dangerous, Too Far Away, Purgatory of Your Love, Ghosts in the Bone, Perfect and Eternal, One Heartbreak, Rains Rust, The Last Duet, The Devil's Prayer, This Old Guitar, Dagger Heart

Sentimental Nightmares

- Released: 2020
- Tracks: Austin via Dallas, Old Friend Jack, Sentimental Nightmares, Right Way, Stolen Horses, Shorter the Skirt, Cajun Queen, If You Don't Stop Crying

Side of the Road

- Released: 2022
- Tracks: Angel at the Gates of Hell, I Lost, Eli's, Side of the Road, Clarksdale, Quiet Renegade, Electric Love, Wild Horses, Drinkin' with the Devil, HARD, Steel in Her Bones

Year	Title	Album
2023	"Empty and Wrong"	
2023	"Say Amen"	
2023	"Songs of Fallen Angels"	
2023	"Hellion"	
2021	"Midnight in America"	
2023	"Songs of Fallen Angels"	
2023	"Say Amen"	
2024	"Livin'"	
2023	"Empty and Wrong"	
2024	"Dive Bar Opera"	
2024	"Cathedral"	
2024	"Ain't Nothin' What It Seems"	
