= Maciej Cieśla =

Polish painter

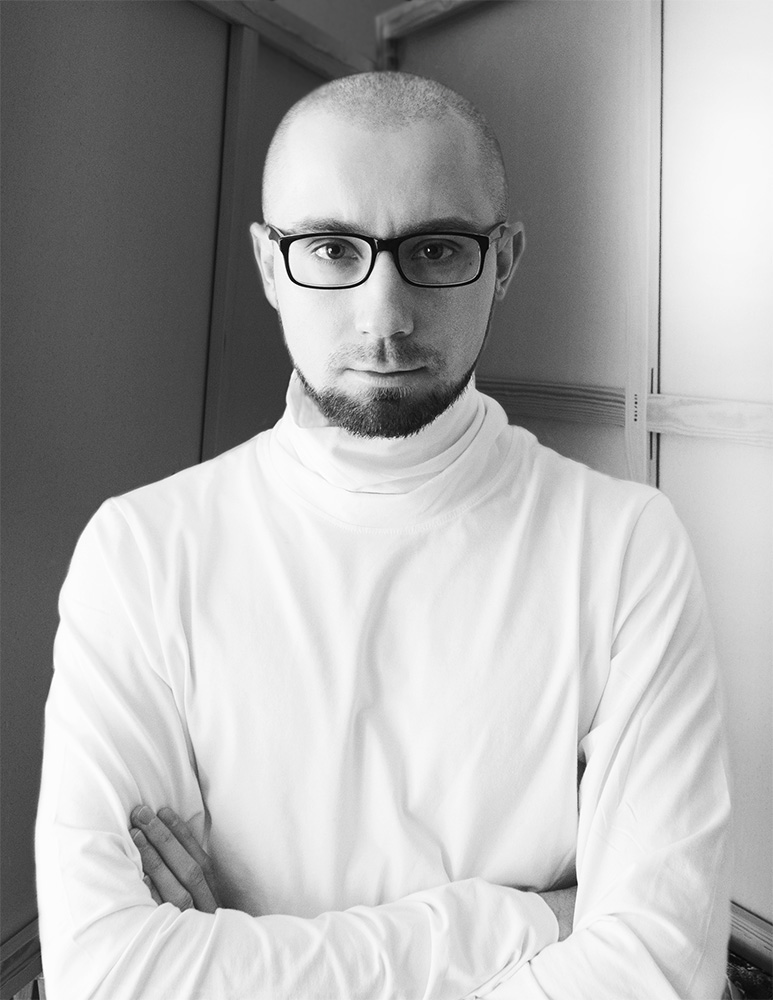
- Born: 1988 (age 37–38); Szczecin, Poland
- Education: Wrocław Academy of Fine Arts
- Occupation: Painter

Maciej Cieśla (born 1988) is a Polish contemporary painter working under nickname "Mecesla".

== Biography ==
Graduate of the Academy of Art in Wrocław with MA degree in painting and sculpture, under the supervision of Piotr Błażejewski. Earlier he attended classes given by Piotr Skłodowski, who is a watercolor painter and architect from Szczecin. Between 2013 and 2016 Maciej worked out his characteristic style, which comprises modern expressionism, neo-fauvism, symbolism and abstraction. His eyesight is impaired due to the Stargardt’s disease (inherited macular degeneration).

== Artistic work ==
His work oscillates between modern expressionism, abstraction, as well as inspirations taken from nature, folklore and social subjects. In his paintings, a woman appears very often as a symbol-form, he refers to archetypes and symbolism in general. The world created in his works contains characters borrowed from Polish folklore and fantasy, such as fauns, water nymphs or devilss of the forest. He often touches upon the subject of the form of nature itself, especially in more abstract works, for instance in the series "Mountain Creek". He also refers to city life, as illustrated by the series of paintings "After alcohol", where he depicts night lifewith a grain of irony. Over the years, Cieśla developed his own style through a reinterpretation of traditional movements, producing colorful and figurative oil paintings that often combine geometric and abstract elements. In interviews, Cieśla has emphasized his strong connection to nature, which he describes as a source of “richness, tranquility and diversity” and as a recurring source of symbols and forms in his work. Cieśla has cited artists such as Joan Miró, Pablo Picasso, Jackson Pollock, Francis Bacon and Edvard Munch as formative influences.

The artist’s first major opening was the vernissage entitled "Satan, woman and apocalypse" in Edyta Stein’s House in Wrocław in 2015. Since 2017 more than a dozen of his paintings can be found in Dresden, in the Abstrakte Momente gallery. He also cooperates with the French online gallery Singulart.

=== Painting series ===
- A composition with a girl and a dog
- Forms and colors of nature – "Mountain Creek" and "Forest cover"
- "Jagoda and Fauns"
- "After alcohol"
- "The cellists"
- Portraits "Between the archetype and self-portrait"
