= Mikhail Tsiselsky =

Ukrainian Soviet naval pilot

Mikhail Petrovich Tsiselsky
- Михайло Петрович Цисельський
- Born: 20 May [O.S. 7 May] 1909; Stoykovo, Russian Empire
- Died: 3 November 1989 (aged 80); Kiev, Ukrainian SSR, Soviet Union
- Military career
- Allegiance: Soviet Union
- Service years: 1932–1938; 1939–1948
- Rank: Major
- Conflicts: World War II; Eastern Front
- Awards: Hero of the Soviet Union

Mikhail Petrovich Tsiselsky (Ukrainian: Миха́йло Петро́вич Цисе́льський Russian: Михаи́л Петро́вич Цисе́льский); May 20, 1909 – November 3, 1989 was a Ukrainian Soviet naval pilot during World War II who was awarded the title Hero of the Soviet Union.

== Biography ==
Mikhail Tsiselsky was born on 20 May [O.S. 7 May] 1909 in Stoykovo (a village in Cherkasy Raion of Cherkasy Oblast) to a Ukrainian peasant family. He finished incomplete secondary school and specialized technical school. He lived in Ussuriysk from 1928. He repaired steam locomotives, and became a member of the All-Union Communist Party (bolsheviks) in 1932.

Tsiselsky joined the Red Army's Fourth Zabaykalsky cavalry regiment in 1932. He completed aircraft maintenance training at Irkutsky in 1934 and subsequently served in the Byelorussian command as an aircraft technician. He completed a naval aviation course at Yeisky in 1936 and then served in the Black Sea Fleet's naval aviation branch.

His first combat mission of the German-Soviet War took place on June 22, 1941. He participated in the destruction of a tank battalion in the Gros-Libental-Odessa district. On September 23, Tsiselsky and his unit sunk a heavy troop transport on the Dniester Liman and killing hundreds of Nazi soldiers and officers, as well as 15 tanks and 20 other vehicles in the Perekop-Sevastopol district in a separate action. For great services to the Motherland, Tsiselsky was awarded his first Order of the Red Banner.

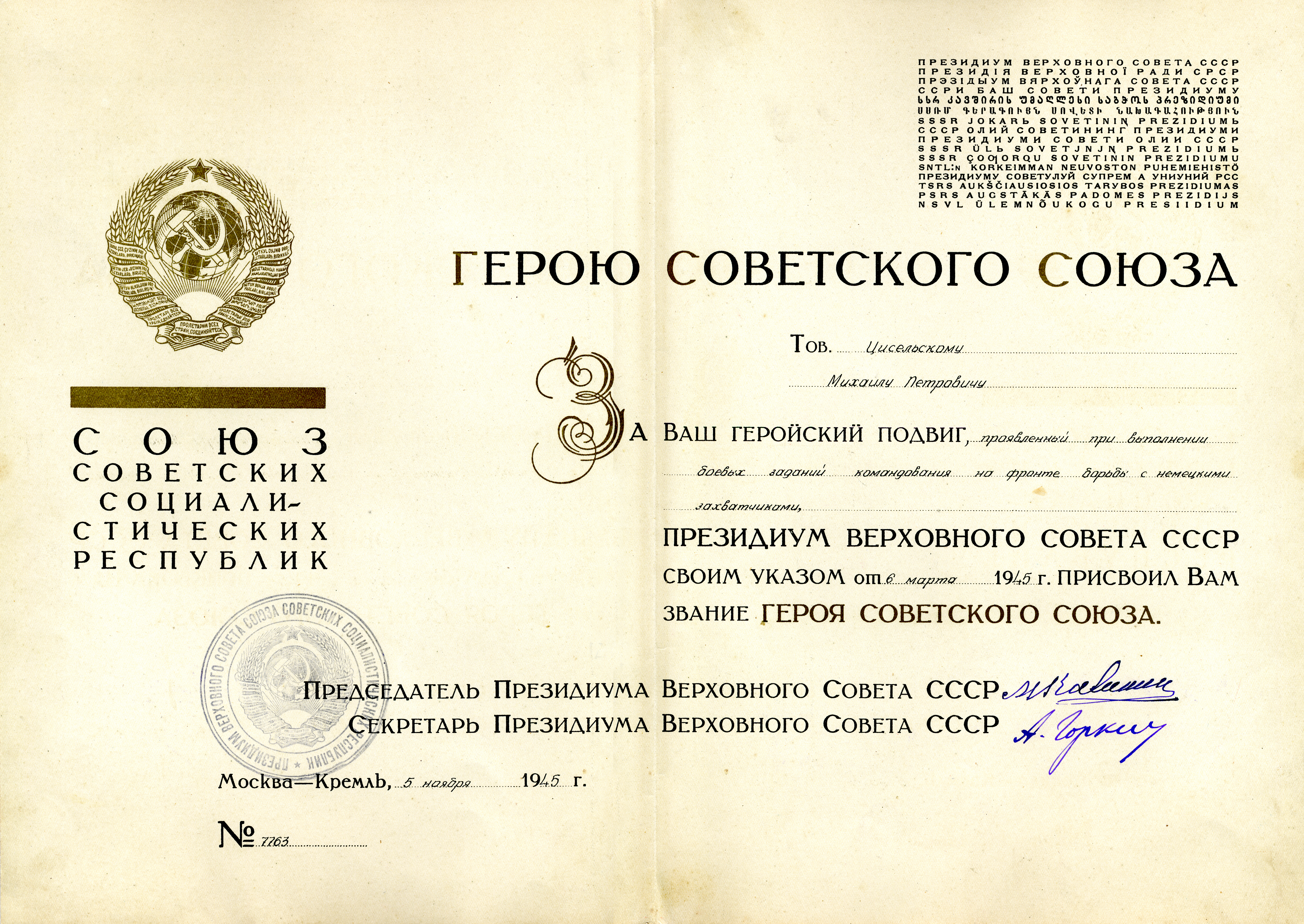
Official document of Supreme Soviet to Hero of Soviet Union Tsiselsky M.P.

Tsiselsky was a Navigator in a bomber squadron of the Baltic Fleet's 12th Guards Aviation Regiment during the German-Soviet War and performed 396 successful combat missions for air reconnaissance and bombardment of enemy ships and troops. He destroyed three troop transports of 11000 tonnes displacement, several vehicle landing craft, motorboats, motor torpedo boat, 31 tanks, 20 cars, fuel storage tanks and 4 transport aircraft. He personally downed three fascist aircraft.

March 6, 1945 he was recognized as a Hero of Soviet Union by decree of the Supreme Soviet for exemplary fulfilment of battle orders on front of the German-Soviet War, and his fortitude and heroism.

Tsiselsky was demobilized as a Major in 1948. During 1948-1955 he worked as a kolkhoz head in a native village. He lived in Kiev from 1955 and worked as a foreman at the "Krasny Rezinschik" plant for the production of mechanical rubber goods.

He died on 3 November 1989 and was buried in Kiev.

== Awards ==
- Hero of the Soviet Union Medal of Gold Star (№ 5083, 6 March 1945)
- Order of Lenin (№29282)
- Order of the October Revolution (№40988)
- Order of the Red Banner, twice (№5667 and №27662)
- Order of the Patriotic War, 1st Class (№ 478013)
- Order of the Red Star (№3737020)
- campaign and jubilee medals
