= Andrzej Ciesielski =

Polish political writer of 16th century

Andrzej Ciesielski was a Polish-Lithuanian political writer, economist and noble politician who lived in the second half of the 16th century. He served as the starosta of Wolbrom and was a supporter of urban development, trade, and urban crafts.

Andrzej Ciesielski was born into a noble family in Cieśle, which at the time belonged to the Radomsko County, part of the Sieradz Voivodeship. He did not receive a university education, instead acquiring extensive knowledge through self-education and contact with writers and people of high culture. In 1557, he stayed in Skierbieszów at the court of Bishop Jakub Uchański, who secured for him the position of starost of Wolbrom.

Andrzej Ciesielski focused mainly on the state's economy, being a supporter of urban development, trade, and urban crafts. In 1571, he published a treatise titled Ad equites legatos, ad conventionem Varsoviensem publice, designatos et declaratos, de regni defensione et iustitiae administratione... oratio, in which he argued that a positive trade balance of the Polish-Lithuanian Commonwealth ensured the inflow of precious metals and determined the country's wealth. He supported the closure of borders policy — a ban on Polish-Lithuanian merchants traveling abroad — which aimed to prevent the outflow of money and rising prices, while encouraging foreign merchants to come and settle in the country He called for the recovery of Silesia and the acquisition of Wallachia. Ciesielski sought the reform of social and religious relations, the establishment of a treasury, and the introduction of permanent taxes to support the military. He considered money to be the nerve of war and harshly criticized the debasement of coinage during the reign of Sigismund Augustus.
