= Michał Cieśla =

Polish basketball player (born 1981)

Personal information
- Born: August 4, 1981 (age 45) Częstochowa, Poland
- Listed height: 6 ft 3 in (1.91 m)
- Listed weight: 200 lb (91 kg)

Career information
- High school: ZSEM Prusa (Częstochowa, Poland)
- College: Jan Długosz University (Częstochowa, Poland)
- Playing career: 1998–2012
- Position: Shooting guard / point guard

Career history
- 1998–2005: Tytan Częstochowa
- 2005–2007: WSZ Częstochowa
- 2007–2009: Start Dobrodzien
- 2009–2010: Mansfield Giants
- 2010–2012: Bradford Dragons

Michał Cieśla (born August 4, 1981) is a Polish former professional basketball player.

== Career ==
- 1998-2005: Tytan Częstochowa POL
- 2005-2007: AZS WSZ Częstochowa POL
- 2007-2009: Start Dobrodzień POL
- 2009-2010: Mansfield Giants GBR
- 2010-2012: Bradford Dragons GBR
