= Maria Ciesielska =

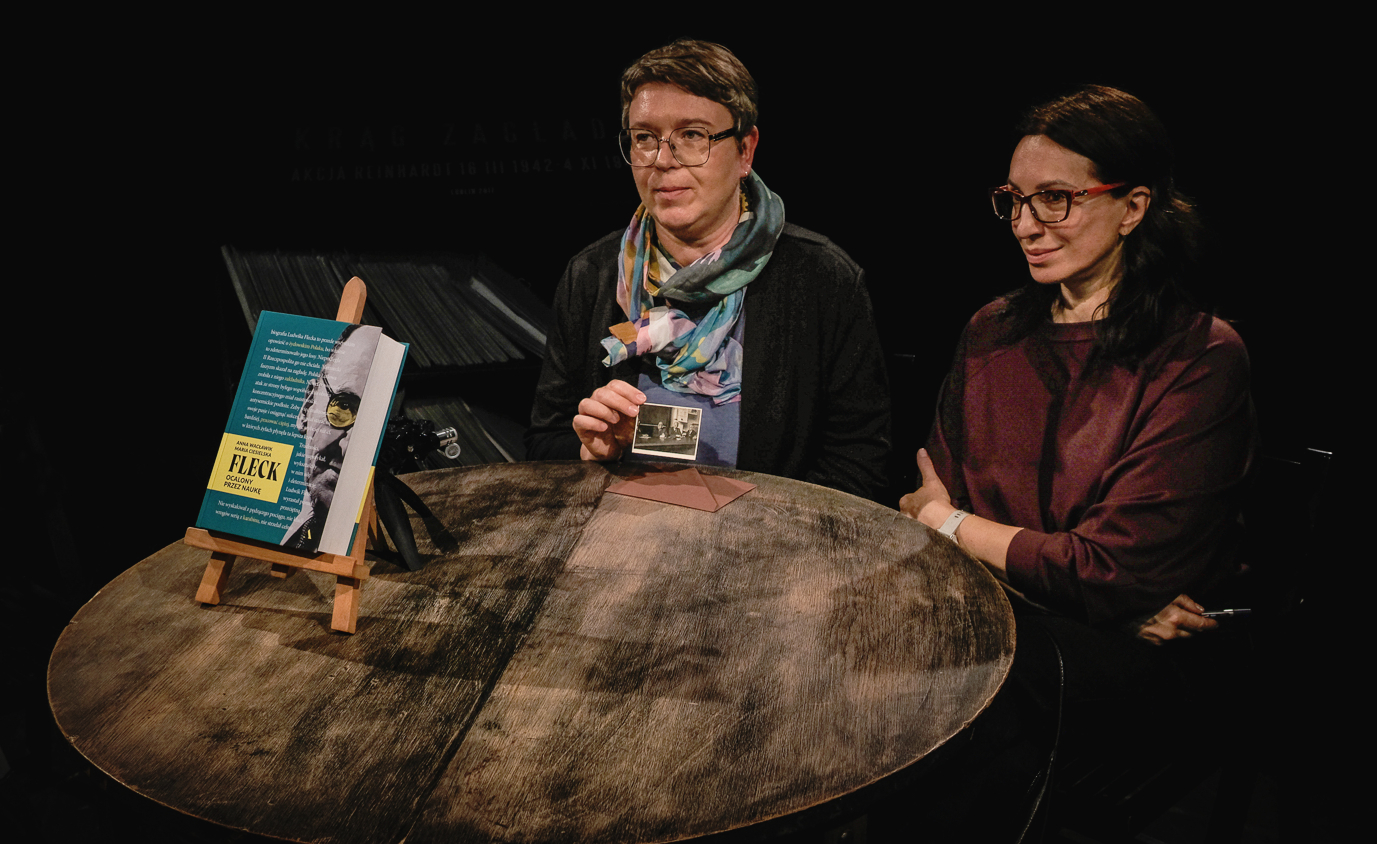
Maria Ciesielska (left) and Anna Wacławik

Maria Ciesielska is a physician and an expert in the history of medicine.

She is a specialist in family medicine and holds a doctorate in the history of medicine.

== Books ==
- 2015: "Taniec wśród mieczów. Polski personel medyczny na Pawiaku w okresie okupacji niemieckiej 1939-1944" [Dance among Swords. Polish Medical Personnel in Pawiak during German Occupation 1939-1944] – Robert Hasselbusch, Maria Ciesielska, Warszawa, Wydawnictwo Muzeum Niepodległości, 2015, ISBN 978-83-62235-64-3.
- 2015: "Tyfus – groźny zabójca i cichy sprzymierzeniec". [Typhus - a dangerous killer and a silent ally.] Maria Ciesielska, Warszawa 2015, Wydawnictwo EKOSAN, ISBN 978-83-935069-0-3.
- 2015: "Szpital obozowy dla kobiet w KL Auschwitz-Birkenau (1942-1945)". [The Camp Hospital for women in Auschwitz-Birkenau (1942-1945)]. Maria Ciesielska, Warszawa 2015, Wydawnictwo Warszawskiego Uniwersytetu Medycznego, ISBN 978-83-7637-306-5. Peer-reviewed.
- 2017: "Lekarze getta warszawskiego". Maria Ciesielska, Warszawa 2017, Wydawnictwo Dwa Światy, ISBN 978-83-948691-0-6. First edition.
- 2017: Lekarze Getta warszawskiego
  - 2022: (English translation) The Doctors of the Warsaw Ghetto, ISBN 978-1-64469-726-9
- 2025: (with Anna Wacławik) Fleck. Ocalony przez naukę, ISBN 978-83-8380-207-7; about Ludwik Fleck
