= Eugeniusz Geppert =

Polish painter

- Born: Eugeniusz Geppert; September 4, 1890; L'viv (now Lviv, Ukraine)
- Died: January 13, 1979 (aged 88); Wrocław
- Education: Jan Matejko Academy of Fine Arts, Jagiellonian University
- Known for: Painting (Colourist movement)
- Style: Colourism
- Movement: Zwornik
- Memorials: Eugeniusz Geppert Academy of Fine Arts in Wrocław

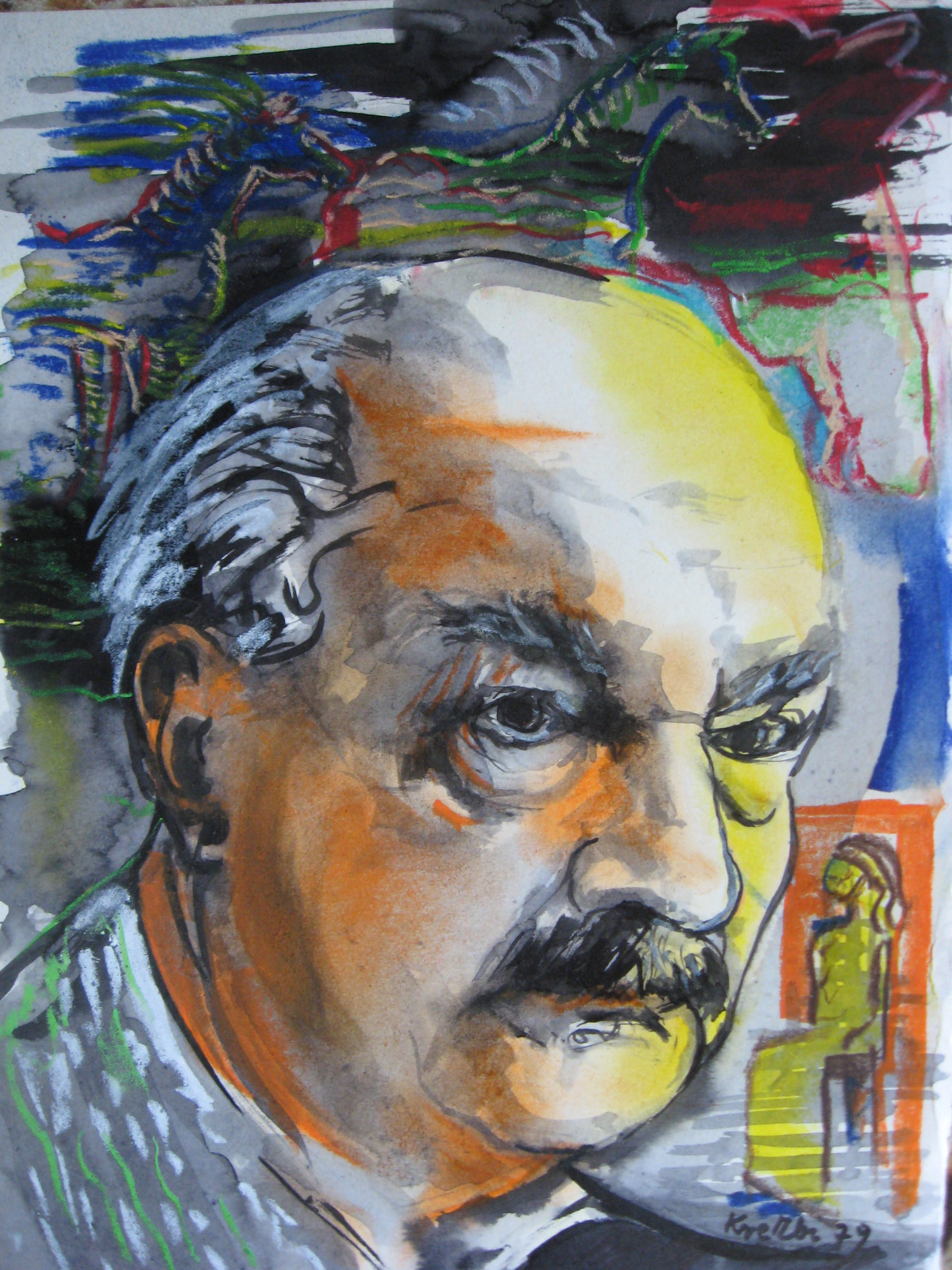
Portrait of Eugeniusz Geppert by Zbigniew Kresowaty

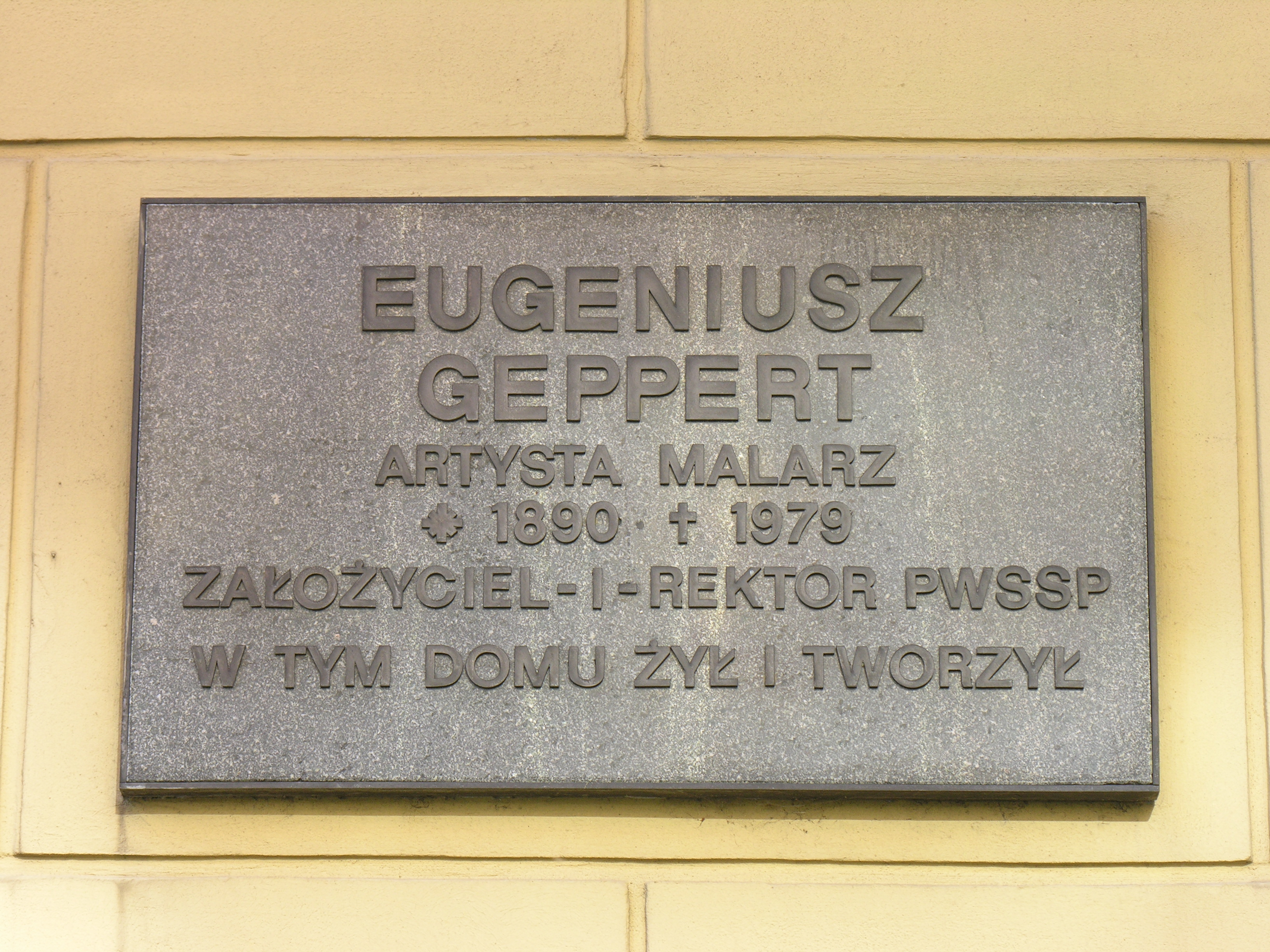
Memorial plaque in Wrocław.

Eugeniusz Geppert (born September 4, 1890 in L'viv, died January 13, 1979 in Wrocław) was a Polish painter associated with the Colourist movement, organizer of the Eugeniusz Geppert Academy of Fine Arts in Wrocław.

Received formal training at the Jan Matejko Academy of Fine Arts in Cracow under the tutelage of Jacek Malczewski as well as at the Jagiellonian University. Geppert also studied art in Paris between 1925 and 1927, as well as in 1957. Before World War II he was a member of the Zwornik arts group. He was a cofounder and the first rector of the first Higher School of the Arts in Wrocław. Between 1950-1961 and 1966-1974 he had his own painting studio.

On April 25, 2008 Wrocław's Academy of Fine Arts was renamed to commemorate him. His work was also part of the painting event in the art competition at the 1932 Summer Olympics.

== Bibliography ==
- Encyklopedia Wrocławia, Wrocław 2000.
