= Lech Rzewuski =

Polish painter

Lech Rzewuski (1941–2004) was a Polish painter.
