= Cieśle, Piotrków County =

Cieśle
- Village
- Location within Poland
- Coordinates: 51°9′14″N 19°45′1″E
- Country: Poland
- Voivodeship: Łódź
- County: Piotrków
- Gmina: Łęki Szlacheckie

Cieśle [ˈt͡ɕɛɕlɛ] is a village in the administrative district of Gmina Łęki Szlacheckie, within Piotrków County, Łódź Voivodeship, in central Poland.
