= Łukasz Konarzewski =

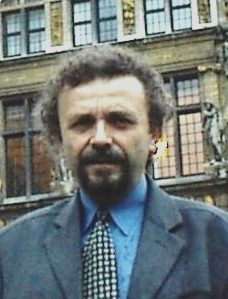
- Born: 22 September 1955 (age 70); Istebna, Poland
- Known for: Fine arts

Łukasz Konarzewski (born 22 September 1955) is a Polish historian of art, art restorer, a civil servant of both central and local governmental administration. Since 2017, the Silesian Provincial Conservator of Monuments in Katowice.

== Biography ==
Konarzewski was born on 22 September 1955 in Istebna. He comes from the Konarzewski family of artists, residing in Istebna, who have been professionally active in Silesia since the 1920s. He is the son of Ludwik Konarzewski-junior and Joanna Konarzewska. He studied in the Department of History of Art at Cardinal Stefan Wyszyński University of Warsaw (Warsaw Theological Academy at that time). In 1984 he defended his final M.A. thesis, under the supervision of the rev. prof. Janusz Pasierb and the assistant-professor Andrzej Olszewski, which dealt with Polish art of the first half of the 20th century.

In his public activity he deals with resources, culture management, popularizing culture, conservation, and also the shaping of the environment. In the years 1991-1999 he was a Municipal Restorer in Cieszyn. Thanks to his creation and application of a conservation method, which was precursory at that time and which enabled the linking of activities of various fields, such as conservation, sociology and social studies as well as planning, it was possible to recover and retain the historic and original character of Cieszyn, which also visibly influenced the quality of the public space. Thanks to this the town became an example to follow in the region, as well as beyond it, when it comes to new solutions in art conservation and architecture. In the area of scientific research, he is one of the discoverers of part of the mediaeval fortifications on Castle Hill in Cieszyn, including, especially, the cylindrical tower, the so-called Tower of Ultimate Defence from the 13th century. The discovery contributes significantly to the development of research into the history of architecture in Poland.

He also conducts research on the methodology of preservation and protection of monuments as well as the influence of activities carried out by the civil service on the shaping of the cultural environment and landscape.

Since the late 1990s of the 20th century he has been working on identification, description, management, promotion and protection of culture and the cultural heritage in Cieszyn Silesia, which is situated on the border between Poland and the Czech Republic. He is the author of a few hundred studies and publications in the fields of art and culture of the 19th and the 20th centuries in the Upper Silesia. They concern particularly the protection of the cultural heritage, methodology and guidelines, history and resources of culture and art, as well as artistic biographies and bibliography of the history of art in Cieszyn Silesia.

He was the initiator and the academic editor of the first monograph on Cieszyn Silesia with respect to the history of art. He is also the author of “The County programme for the protection of monuments…” for Cieszyn county (which was one of the first programs of this kind in Poland) and Vademecum of contemporary creators of culture and artistic groups in Cieszyn county. He was one of the originators of the idea to create the rev. Leopold Jan Szersznik Award, which is the highest distinction and promotion for people and institutions that create, propagate and protect the cultural heritage on the Polish side of Cieszyn Silesia, as well as Trans-Olza (its western part that lies in the Czech Republic). Since 2015 he has been the chairman of the committee that grants the award.

=== The most important monographs and publications ===
- “Ludwik Konarzewski senior” (1989) ( a summary in English)
- “Conservation guidelines in the form of project concepts for The Market Square in Niepołomice near Kraków” (1994)
- “Conservation guidelines in the form of project concepts for The Town Hall Square in Niepołomice near Kraków” (1995)
- “Conservation guidelines for the Clothmakers’ House in Bielsko Biała” (1996)
- “Ludwik Konarzewski junior’s real painting”1998)
- “Joanna Konarzewska, or Silesian flowers” (2001)
- “Ludwik Konarzewski Sr's patriotic and religious allegories in the pictorial presentation by Iwona Konarzewska” (2003)
- “Cultural landscape of Poland on the eve of Poland’s entering the European Union – ways to protect and shape it, following the example of activities undertaken by the civil service in Cieszyn” (2003)
- “Painting on Curtain from Ustroń” (2005)
- “Cieszyn no longer historic” (2007)
- “The County program for the protection of monuments in Cieszyn county” (2008)
- “Vademecum of contemporary creators of culture and artistic groups in Cieszyn county” (2009)
- “A record of vintage buildings in Cieszyn county” (2010)
- “Culture in the Polish part of Cieszyn Silesia in the interwar period” (1918-1939) (2011)
- “A catalogue of the collection of the Konarzewskis’ works of art and exhibits from Istebna on Bucznik” (2012)
- “The Cultural Life” (2015)
- Culture and art of Cieszyn Silesia throughout centuries (a monograph- editorial works and co-authorship) – vol. 8 of the series The History of Cieszyn Silesia from the dawn of time to contemporary times, edited by Idzi Panic (2016) (summary in English)
- “Impact of public administration on the space quality on the example of conservation effort in the 1990s in Cieszyn” (2016) (translated into English)

== Bibliography ==
- Przemysław Czernek, “The Architecture of Cieszyn Silesia after 1945,” [in:] Culture and art of Cieszyn Silesia throughout centuries edited by Łukasz Konarzewski, vol. 8. Cieszyn 2016, pp. 362, 370–371, 373 ISBN 978-83-944146-1-0;
- Łukasz Konarzewski, “The influence of the civil service on the quality of space, using examples of conservation works in the 90s of the 20th century in Cieszyn” [in:] Ochrona Zabytków, no 2/2016 2(269), LXIX, Warsaw 2016. pp. 31–54 ISSN 0029-8247;
- Wojciech Święs, “The Cultural Life” [in:] Śląsk Cieszyński w latach 1945-2015. edited by Krzysztof Nowak, Cieszyn 2015, p. 442 ISBN 978-83-935147-9-3
