= Ludwik Konarzewski =

Polish artist (1885–1954)

Ludwik Konarzewski (senior)
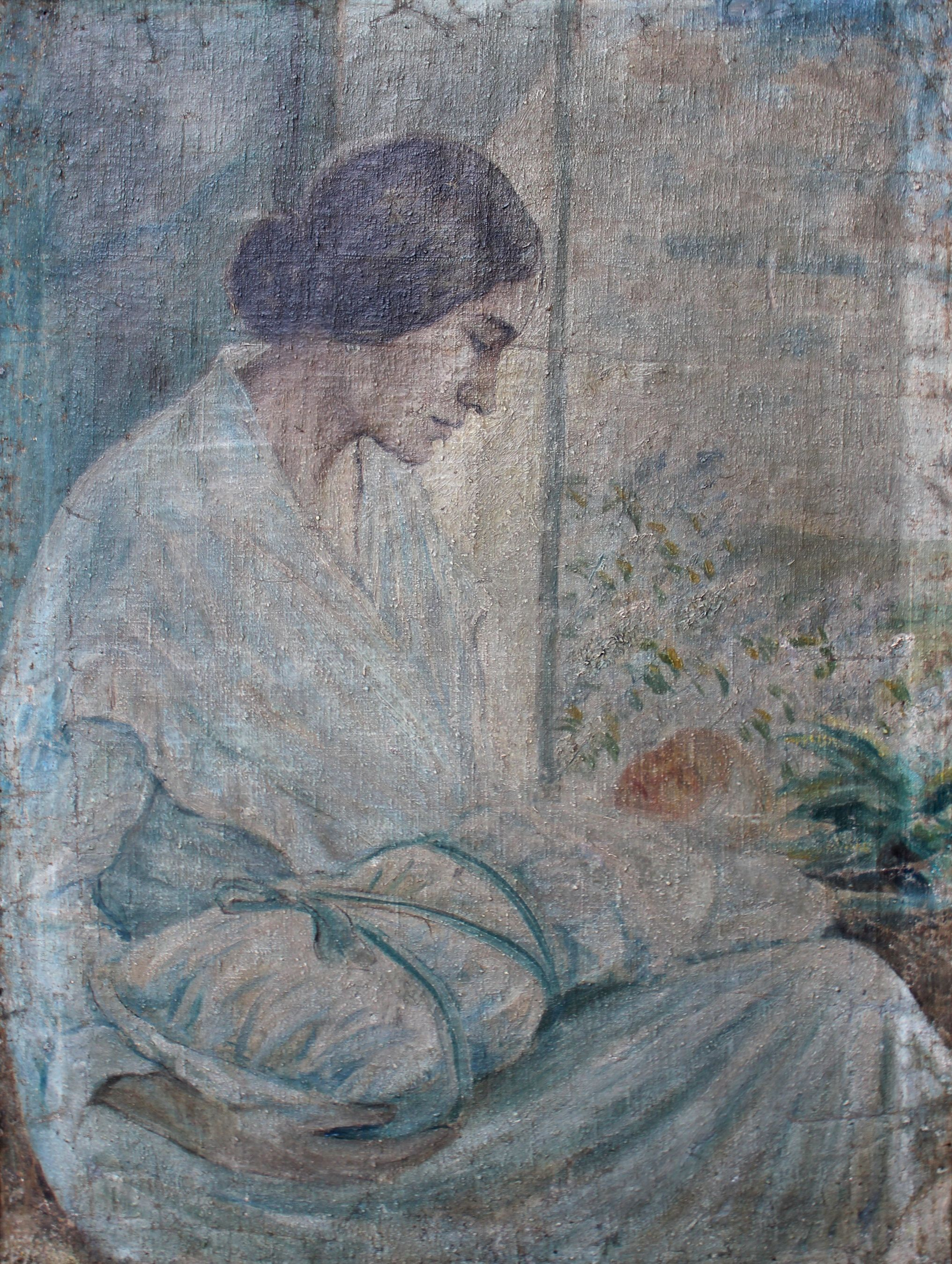
- The portrait of wife Jadwiga and their son Ludwik; Buzuluk 1918
- Born: 18 August 1885; Wilanów, Poland
- Died: 2 October 1954 (aged 69); Istebna, Poland
- Known for: Painting,
- Children: Ludwik Konarzewski (junior)

You may also be looking for Ludwik Konarzewski (junior).

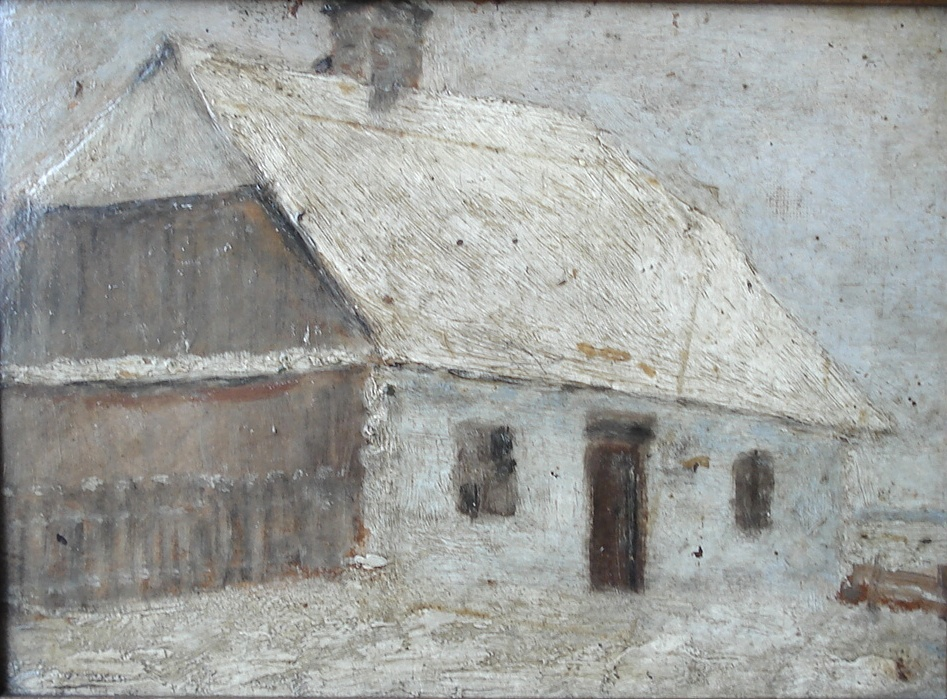
A hut near the Cracow, about 1905

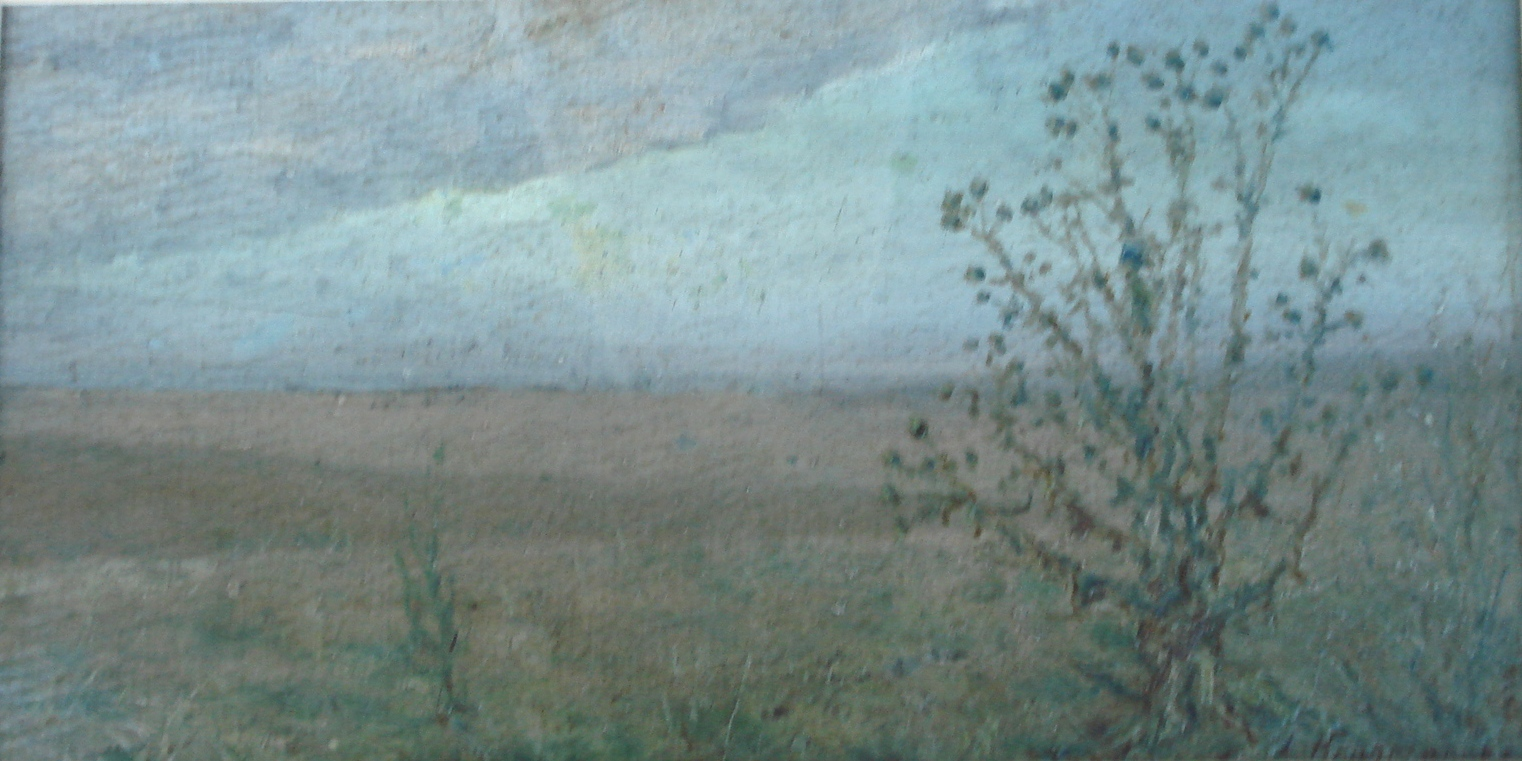
The landscape with the teasel, Buzuluk about 1915

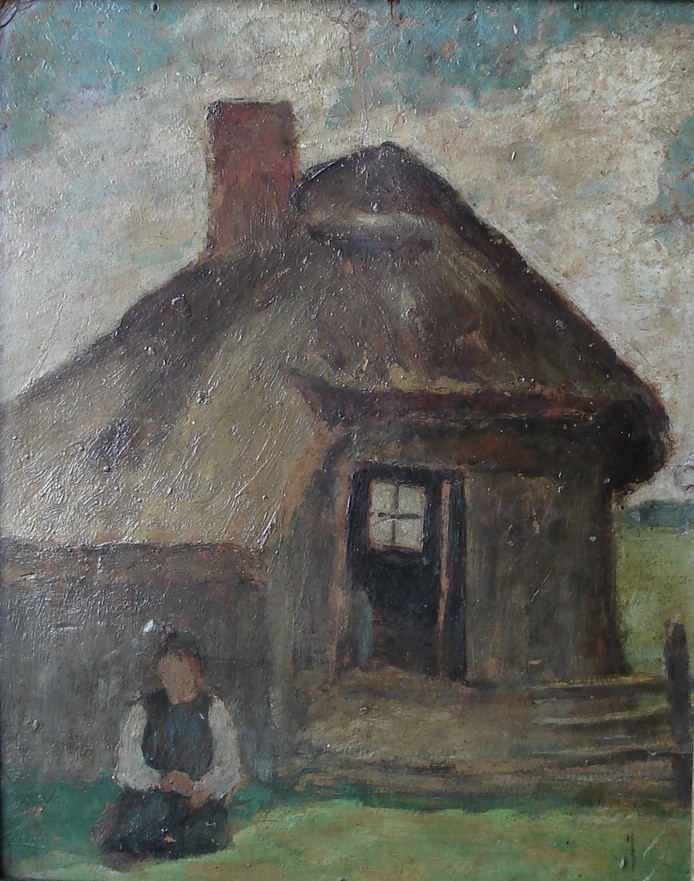
In the front of a hut, about 1910

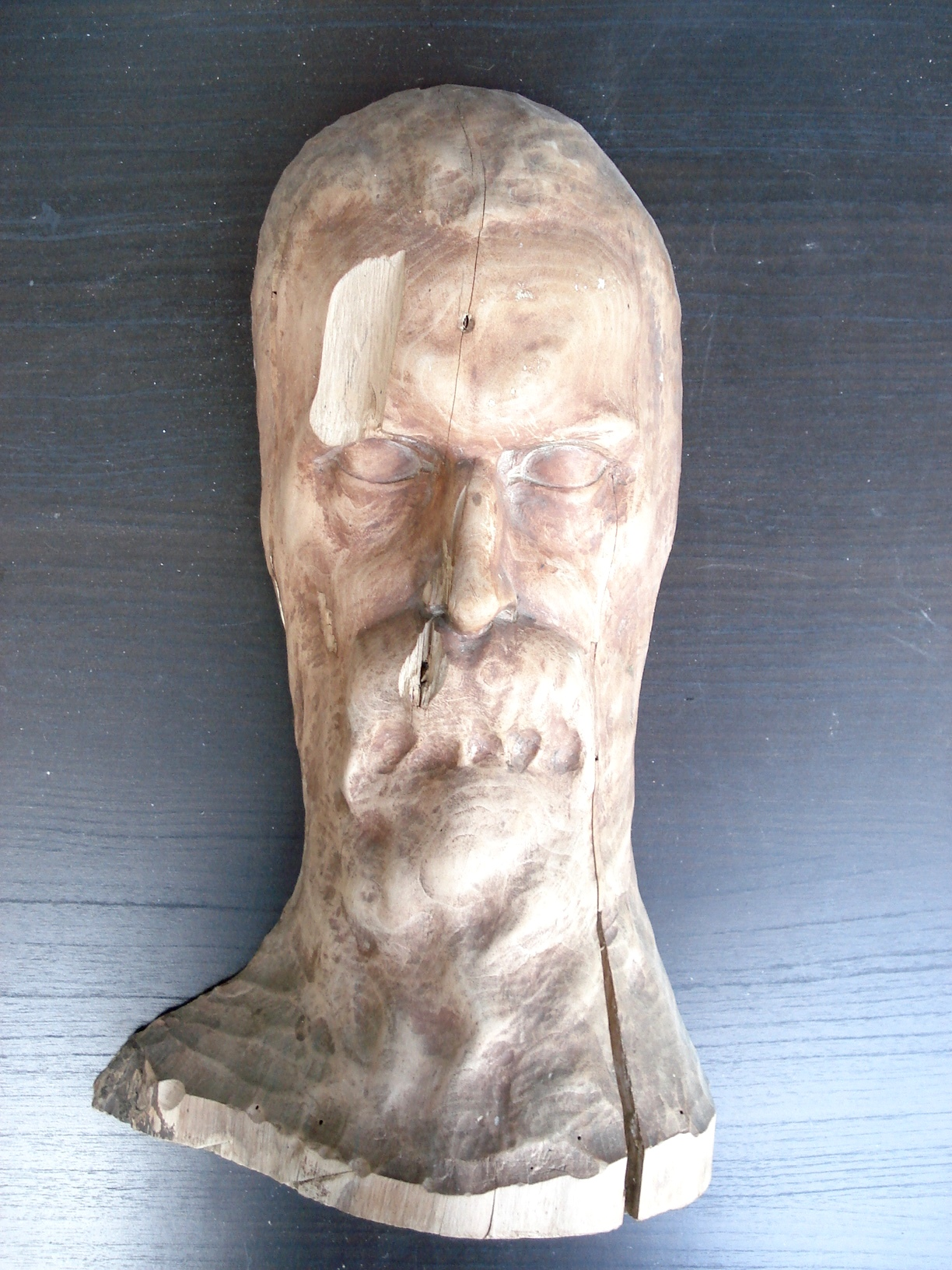
The sage; wooden sculpture, about 1930

Ludwik Konarzewski – senior (August 18, 1885, Wilanów – October 2, 1954, Istebna) was a Polish painter, sculptor and teacher of fine arts who worked in Upper Silesia and Cieszyn Silesia.

== Life ==
He commenced his plastic arts’ education at the School of Fine Arts in Warsaw in the year 1904, where at first he had his tuition under Stanisław Lentz and Karol Tichy. As a result of taking part in a youth manifestation against the Tsar’s rule in 1905 he was obliged to give up further studies in Warsaw. He continued his artistic study in Kraków between 1905-1910. He studied painting under the direction of (among others) the following artists painters, Stanisław Dębicki. Józef Mehoffer, Jan Stanisławski, Józef Unierzyski and Stanisław Wyspiański and sculpture under Konstanty Laszczka. L. Konarzewski Sr. was also a representative of the Polish school of Art Nouveau.

After completing his course of studies with distinction in 1910, he spent the following two years on foreign travels and stays in four of the great centres of European art: Paris, Munich, Vienna and Rome. He undertook these journeys in the company of Jan Wałach, with whom he had become acquainted during his student days. Wałach, who came from Istebna in the Silesia-Cieszyn region, later became known as a graphics artist, draftsman and also painter and sculptor.

In 1913 Ludwik Konarzewski Sr. painted the interior of the Orthodox Church in Rozdół, near Stryj, from where he made frequent plein-air excursion to Czarnochora in the East Carpathians, where – after pattern of a few Polish painters – Sichulski, Pautsch or Jarocki – he made a painter’s record of the Hucul culture.

After his marriage in 1914 to Jadwiga Wałach (the sister of Jan Wałach) he went to pay a visit to his father, at the time the organist in Kamieńczyk, on the river Bug. They were there when the first World War broke out. Konarzewski together with his wife, was interned deep inside the Russian empire, in the village of Gratschovka about 50 kilometers from Buzuluk a town in Orenburg Oblast. He spent his time in pedagogic and cultural activities among the families of Polish and Lithuanian exiles and their children. In 1918 he moved to the nearest township – Buzułuk, where he taught history and drawing in the local school spending his spare time painting. He exhibited his works in Buzułuk, some of them were also shown in a collected exhibition in Moscow.

At the beginning of 1920 Konarzewski returned to Poland. He stayed first of all in Lublin, then – after a brief period in Warsaw – in the summer of 1920 he settled to Ustroń, in the Silesia-Cieszyn region. But in 1923 he moved to what was to be his final home in Istebna. He not only devoted himself to his creative work but also took up organizational and educational activities in the community. He started a school of Plastic Arts, which in the course of time grew to be a workshop executing sacred and other interiors, then he built a guest house which became transformed into a vigorous cultural summer-holiday centre.

At the outbreak of World War II he escaped with his family to the Eastern part of Poland, but at the end of September, after the Soviet’s invasion from the East, he came back to Kraków. In 1940 he made an unsuccessful attempt to escape to Hungary. In the end he spent the whole time of the German occupation in Kraków.

In 1945 he opened a workshop in Katowice in Silesia and in the same year initiated a course for sculpture in coal in Rydułtowy, near Wodzisław Śląski, and then in 1948 he returned for good to Istebna, where in temporary conditions (his pre-war property was virtually entirely destroyed and plundered) he revived his workshops and the school of plastic arts.

Throughout his whole life Ludwik Konarzewski-senior devoted himself simultaneously to painting and sculpture, made stained glass windows and compositions and also applied art artifacts. In all these fields of his endeavour a mélange of influences can be seen, primarily the aesthetic ideas of Young Poland (Młoda Polska), but also other, sometimes extreme trends in European culture. His creative art has particularly original values in the context of the region where it arose.

== See also ==
- List of Polish sculptors

== Further reading and looking ==
- The lexicon of the Polish artists and foreign – active in Poland (died before 1966), edited by Jolanta Maurin-Białostocka and Janusz Derwojed, vol. 4 Wrocław 1986, p. 78-80, ISBN 83-04-01983-3
- Konarzewski Łukasz: Ludwik Konarzewski senior, [in:] "Ziemia śląska", edited by Lech Szaraniec, vol. 2, Katowice 1989, p. 49-50 ISSN 0860-6676
- Gniazdo na Buczniku („A nest on Bucznik”) – a documentary about the Konarzewski family, directed by Aleksandra Dendor, produced by Polish TV in 1993;
