= Oskar Zawisza =

Polish-Czech Catholic priest, composer, and activist (1878–1933

- Born: 23 November 1878; Jablunkov, Austrian Silesia
- Died: 18 January 1933 (aged 54); Těrlicko, Czechoslovakia
- Citizenship: Austrian, Czechoslovak
- Occupation(s): Catholic priest, publicist

Oskar Zawisza (23 November 1878 – 18 January 1933) was a Polish Catholic priest, composer and educational activist.

== Biography ==
Zawisza was born on 23 November 1878 in Jablunkov. He was son of a teacher from Jablunkov. Zawisza finished German gymnasium in Bielsko and Theological faculty in Olomouc. He was a pupil of Czech composer Josef Nešvera. Zawisza was ordained as a priest on 23 July 1902. Then he became curate in Petrovice u Karviné, Dolní Bludovice, Niemiecka Lutynia, Strumień and Cieszyn. On 1 July 1911 he became a rector in Těrlicko.

He collaborated with Gwiazdka Cieszyńska and Zaranie Śląskie magazines. Zawisza conducted historical and ethnographic research and wrote also several books: Dzieje Strumienia (History of Strumień), Dzieje Karwiny (History of Karviná) and Śpiewnik góralski (Goral's songbook); and operas Dożynki, Święta Barbara and Czarne diamenty, symphonic poem Znad brzegów Olzy and symphony Z niwy śląskiej.

Zawisza died on 18 January 1933 in Těrlicko, at the age of 54.
