= Zaranie Śląskie =

Polish magazine

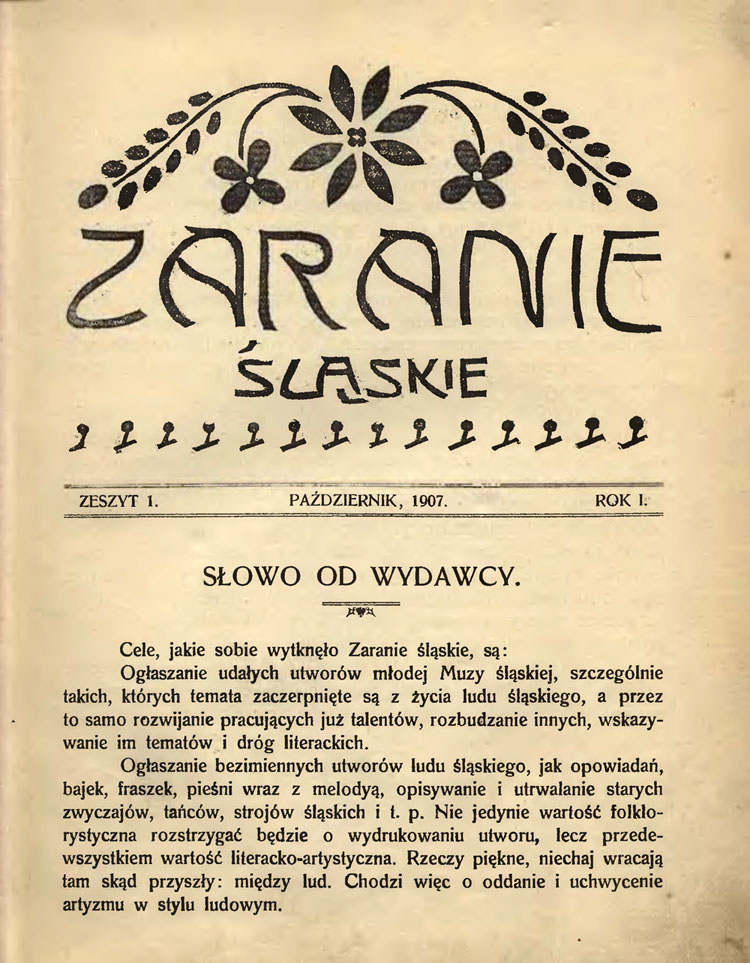
First issue of Zaranie Śląskie

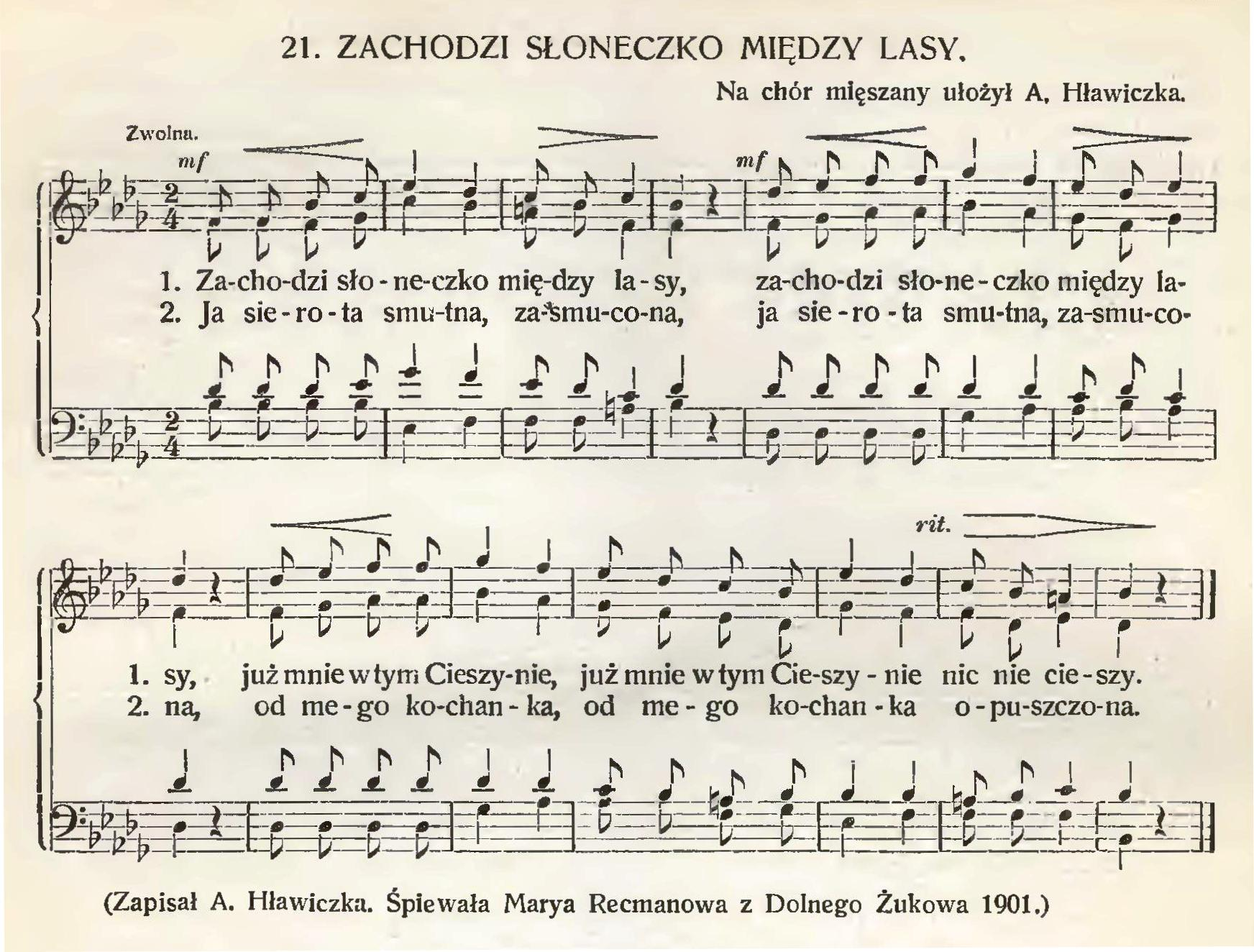
Folk song Zachodzi Słoneczko Między Lasy (The Sun is Setting Through the Woods) adapted by Andrzej Hławiczka, Zaranie Śląskie, 2/1909.

Zaranie Śląskie (Polish for "Dawn of Silesia") was a Polish quarterly literary magazine devoted to the culture and history of Silesia. It was founded in 1907 by Ernest Farnik and published in Cieszyn.

It focused on the region of Cieszyn Silesia, however, since the 1930s, the magazine gradually left this area of interest and focused more on Upper Silesia. Zaranie Śląskie published historical and folkloristic articles, literary works, folk songs, and similar cultural works of interest. Many well-known regional writers and activists contributed to the magazine, e.g. Ludwik Brożek, Emanuel Grim, Andrzej Hławiczka, Paweł Kubisz, Jan Łysek, Antoni Macoszek, Julian Przyboś, Oskar Zawisza and others.

The publishing of the magazine was resumed after World War II. It was published in Katowice in 1945-1948 and later from 1957. At this stage of its history, it hadn't too much common with the region of Cieszyn Silesia. Zaranie Śląskie ceased to exist in 1992.
