= Emanuel Grim =

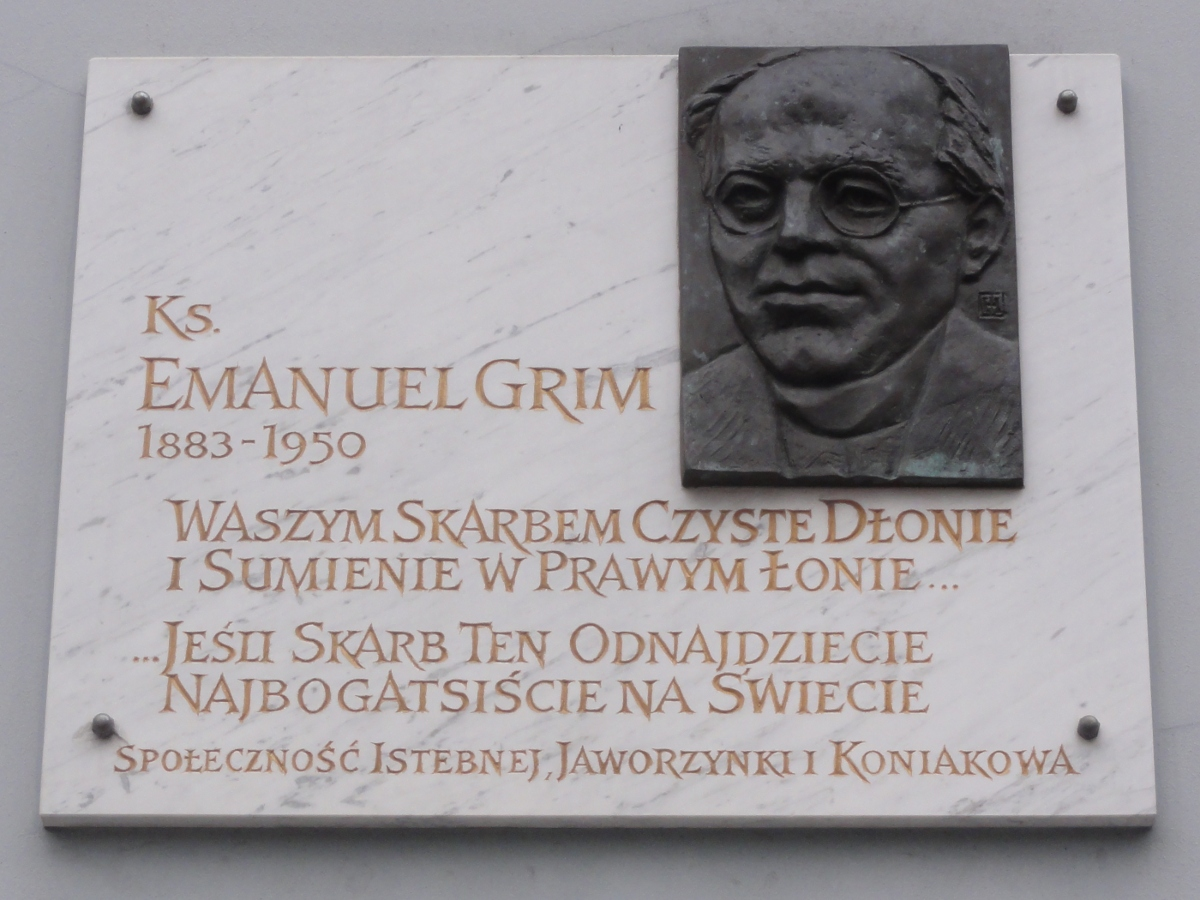
- Memorial plaque in Istebna
- Born: 1 January 1883; Karwina, Austria-Hungary
- Died: 18 October 1950 (aged 67); Cieszyn, Poland
- Resting place: Istebna
- Citizenship: Austrian, Polish
- Occupations: Catholic priest, writer

Emanuel Grim (1 January 1883 – 18 October 1950) was a Polish Catholic priest, writer and journalist from the region of Cieszyn Silesia. He was one of the most important figures of the Polish-Catholic political camp in Cieszyn Silesia in the interwar period.

He was born in the coal mining town of Karviná to a coal miner's family. Grim graduated in 1904 from Polish gymnasium in Cieszyn and later studied theological studies in Vidnava and Wrocław and on 23 August 1908 was ordained as a Catholic priest. Grim later worked as a vicar in Rychvald, Zebrzydowice, Jablunkov, Cieszyn and Brenna. He later worked as a priest in Górki Wielkie and then, in 1917-1935 and 1937-1950 in Istebna. Grim also worked briefly in 1935-1937 in Skoczów.

Grim was a member of several organizations, including Związek Śląskich Katolików (Association of Silesian Catholics), of which he was a chairman in 1929-1939.

Grim was active not only in spiritual and political life of Cieszyn Silesia but also published his works in Zaranie Śląskie and Gwiazdka Cieszyńska magazines (for long time under pen name Ślązak) and wrote several books. In his works Grim often observes the life of Gorals from Istebna and appreciates their traditions and the beauty of the Silesian Beskids mountain range. Grim was a Polish patriot, stood against the policies of Germanization and Czechization; and always connected the fate of Cieszyn Silesia with the fate of whole Silesia and Poland. Religious motives can also be found in his works. He also organized amateur theatre plays.

Grim died on 18 October 1950 in Cieszyn and is buried in Istebna.

== Works ==
- Paweł Stalmach, jego życie i działalność w świetle prawdy (1910)
- Z nad brzegów Olzy (1913)
- Jasełka śląskie (1919), (1932)
- Paweł Stalmach, niestrudzony bojownik o sprawę narodową, który budził lud śląski (1924)
- Dwa orły śląskie - pięć chwil z życia Stalmacha i Miarki, ujętych w sceniczne obrazki w setną rocznicę urodzin (1924)
- Kwiat paproci (1926)
- Wanda (1932)
- Dla Ciebie Polsko (Obrona Karwiny) (1934)
- Znad źródeł Olzy (1935)
- Baśnie z Podbeskidzia śląskiego (editor)
