= Ludwik Konarzewski-junior =

Polish artist (1918–1989)

Ludwik Konarzewski (junior)
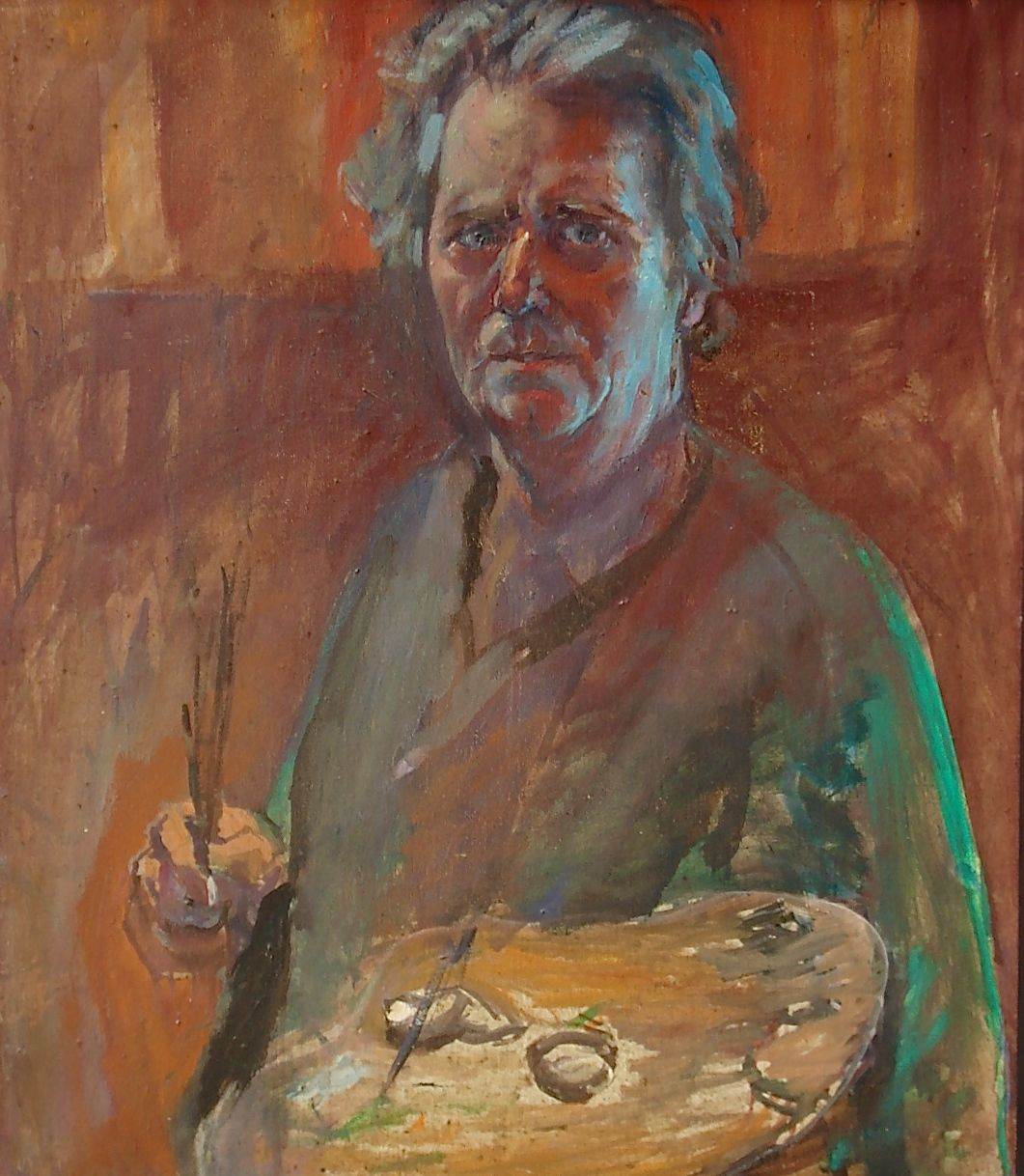
- The last self-portrait of artist
- Born: 20 April 1918; Buzuluk, Russian Empire
- Died: 23 January 1989 (aged 70); Cieszyn, Poland
- Known for: Painting, sculpture
- Movement: Neo-expressionism

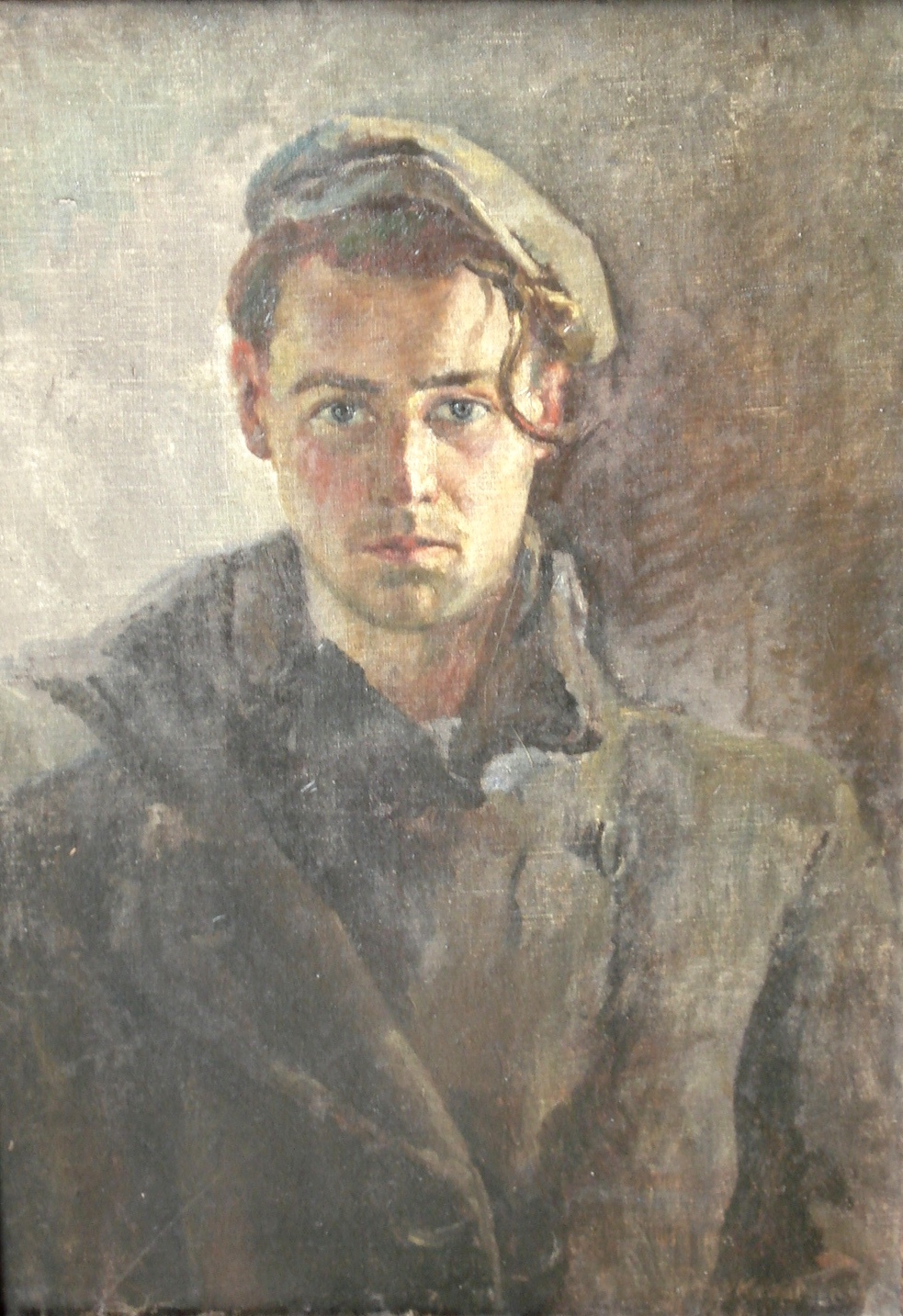
The self-portrait, Kraków 1942

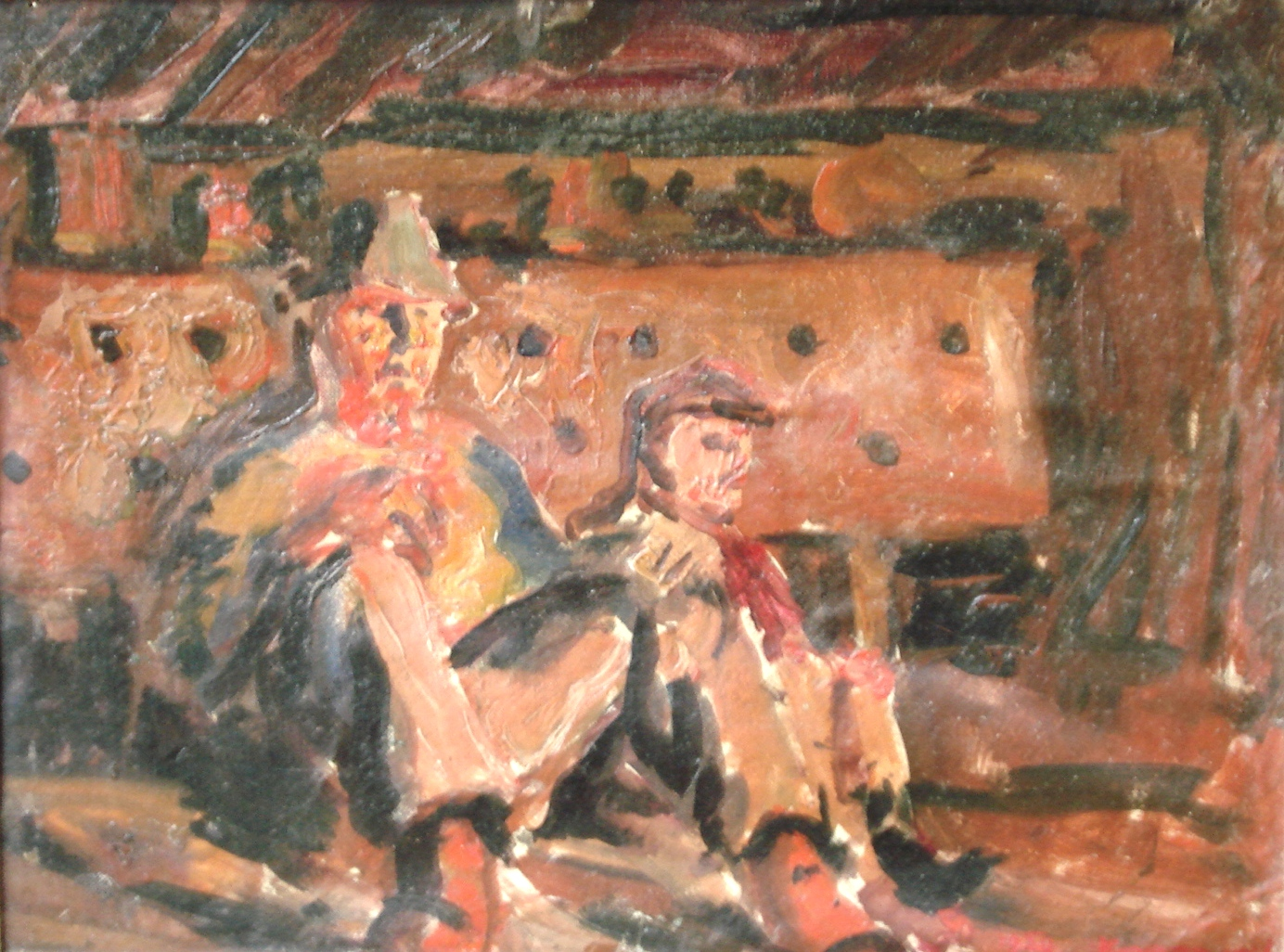
The moment of the miner's rest, about 1950

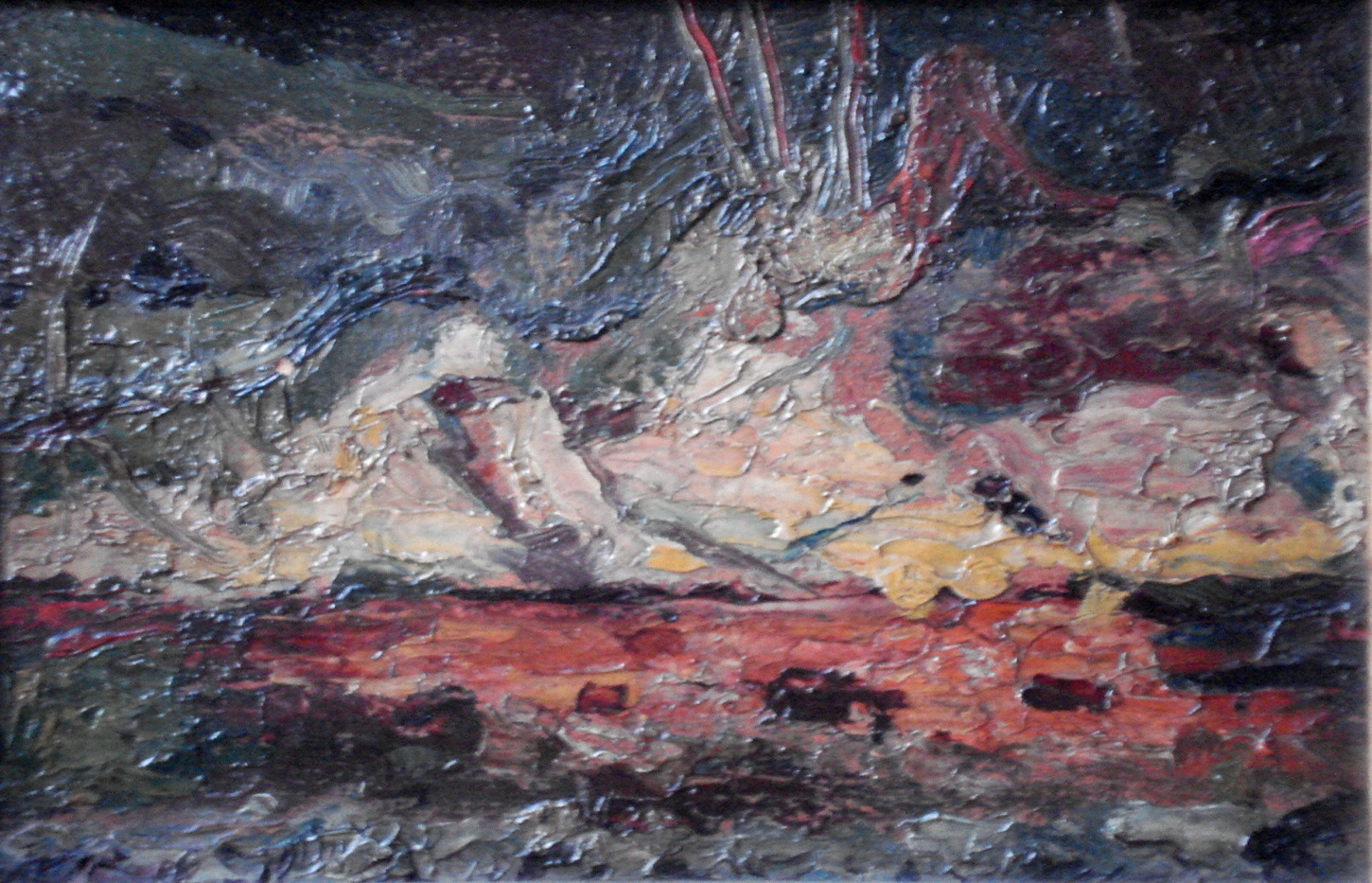
The river in the summer

Ludwik Konarzewski – junior (20 April 1918 in Buzuluk – 23 January 1989 in Cieszyn) was a Polish painter, sculptor and teacher of fine arts who worked in Upper Silesia and Cieszyn Silesia. A square in Rydułtowy is named after him. Konarzewski owed his primary artistic education to his father, Ludwik Konarzewski – senior. He started his studies (in painting) at the Academy of Fine Arts in Kraków in 1938, and finished in 1948, being interrupted by the Second World War. He studied under the direction of (among others) the following colourist painters: Wladyslaw Jarocki, Fryderyk Pautsch, Jerzy Fedkowicz, Zbigniew Pronaszko, Eugeniusz Eibisch and also, temporarily, Wojciech Weiss. He studied sculpture under Xawery Dunikowski and Stanisław Horno-Popławski. He created outdoor monuments such as the sculpture of Karol Miarka in Zabrze and Silesian Insurgents in Rydułtowy. Konarzewski worked as a teacher in Rydułtowy, near Wodzisław Śląski for 30 years. He was a director of the state owned Art Centre that he set up with his father. He had an influence on the artistic and esthetic tastes of the local community – just as his father had done in Istebna in the period between the two wars.

He is the creator of at least 1,000 oil paintings, numerous polychromes and artistic elements of church interiors and public buildings in Upper Silesia, and also in the regions around Kraków and Białystok, as well as other places in Poland.

Privately – he and his wife Joanna had three children: daughter Iwona Konarzewska – a portrait painter and two sons: Ludwik (an entrepreneur) and Łukasz.

== Paintings ==
Portraiture, and especially self-portraits and portraits of members of his family constitute the greatest elements of Ludwik Konarzewski Jr’s artistic heritage. Also, his own unique interpretation of landscape is worth noting. Following Dunikowski, with reference to compact mass and a degree of decorativeness, his sculptures are also characterized by erudition in terms of the variety of techniques used (wood, metal, stone, ceramic forms, and majolica). What is noticeable in his early paintings, from the 1940s and 1950s, is the influence of the colourists, gained from his studies at the Academy of Fine Arts. In the years that follow that influence subsides, and yields to a neo-expressionism that is manifested especially in landscapes. However, all these works share a realistic expression of reality that is revealed with special force in a very personal attitude to the people portrayed. This constitutes an essential characteristic and value in his works as compared with trends and directions in art in the second half of the 20th century which, on the whole, oscillated beside or beyond visible meaningful content. Nowadays it is his earlier works that seem to be particularly valuable: despite a visible influence of the school, they contain, in a realistic form, his personal and original way of perceiving reality through fine arts.

== Collections ==
The works of Ludwik Konarzewski Jr. are part of the collections of the following institutions: The Museum of the History of Katowice (Muzeum Historii Katowic), The Beskid Museum in Wisła (Muzeum Beskidzkie w Wiśle) and in the artist’s house and studio in Istebna in Cieszyn Silesia.

== Further reading and looking ==
- Władysław Barański: “Beskid Śląski: przewodnik”, p. 249, Pruszków 2007 ISBN 978-83-89188-71-7
- Golec Józef, Bojda Stefania: Słownik biograficzny Ziemi Cieszyńskiej. T. 2. - Cieszyn,1995, p. 101-102 ISBN 8360431868, ISBN 9788360431863
- Łukasz Konarzewski: Malarstwo rzeczywiste Ludwika Konarzewskiego-juniora (Factual painting of Ludwik Konarzewski-junior), „Znad Olzy” No 3 December/grudzień 1998, p. 4 ISSN 1506-3992
- Nasz dziennik.pl, Związani z Ziemią Cieszyńską 2008, Nr 231 (3248)
- Sylwetki twórców i popularyzatorów sztuki województwa bielskiego, [red. i oprac. haseł Zofia Bożek], Bielsko-Biała, 1987, p. 51-52 ISBN 83-7004-019-5, ISBN 978-83-7004-019-2
- Gniazdo na Buczniku ( „A nest on Bucznik”) – a documentary about the Konarzewski family, directed by Aleksandra Dendor, produced by Polish TV in 1993;
