= Jarocki =

Jarocki a surname. Notable people with the surname include:

- Feliks Paweł Jarocki (1790–1865), Polish zoologist and entomologist
- Jerzy Jarocki (1929–2012), Polish theatre director, translator, playwright and academic
- Władysław Jarocki (1879–1965), Polish explorer and painter
