= Istebna =

- Village
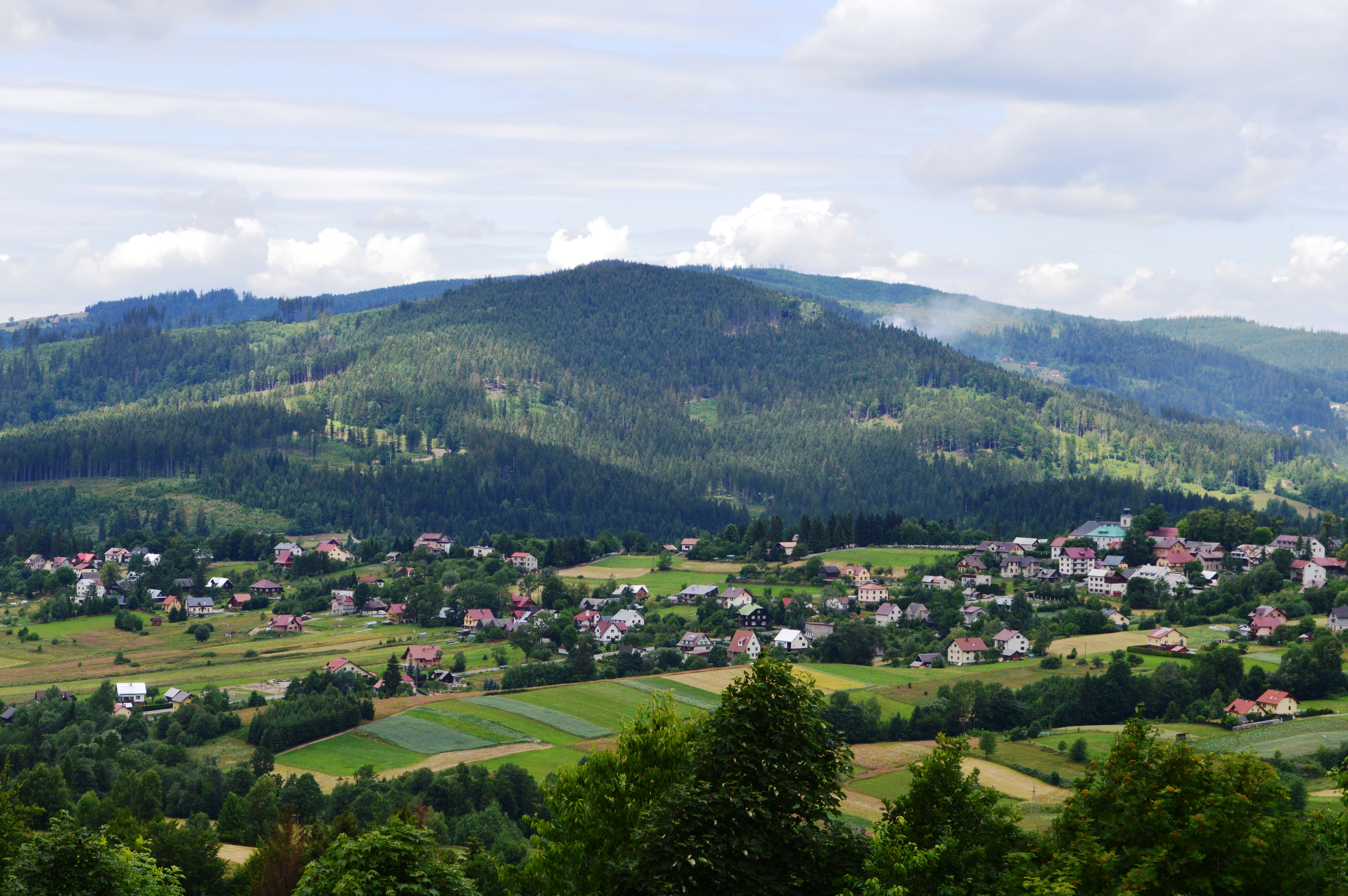
- View of Istebna

- Coat of arms
- Interactive map of Istebna
- Location within Silesian Voivodeship Location within Poland
- Coordinates: 49°33′50.75″N 18°53′35.82″E
- Country: Poland
- Voivodeship: Silesian
- County: Cieszyn
- Gmina: Istebna
- First mentioned: 1583

Government
  - Mayor: Jerzy Michałek

Area
  - Total: 47.41 km^{2} (18.31 sq mi)

Population (2012)
  - Total: 5,078
  - Density: 107.1/km^{2} (277.4/sq mi)
- Time zone: UTC+1 (CET)
  - Summer (DST): UTC+2 (CEST)
- Postal code: 43-470
- Car plates: SCI
- Website: www.ug.istebna.pl

Istebna [iˈstɛbna] is a large village and the seat of Gmina Istebna, Cieszyn County in the Silesian Voivodeship, southern Poland. The village is situated in the Silesian Beskids mountain range, near the borders with the Czech Republic and Slovakia, in the historical region of Cieszyn Silesia. The Olza River flows through the village.

== Etymology ==
The name is cultural in origin, derived from the word (j)istba, meaning a room in a (especially rural) house (see also izba). It is conjectured that the name was conveyed by settlers from Istebné in modern-day Slovakia who supposedly established the village. Historically, it was also known as Gistebna (1621, 1629) or Istebne (1724; the name in plural form, meaning rooms).

== History ==
The village was first mentioned in a 1592 document, which retrospectively mentioned a village called Jistebne which was around As early as 1583. It belonged then to the Duchy of Teschen, a fee of the Kingdom of Bohemia and a part of the Habsburg monarchy.

After the 1848 Revolutions in the Austrian Empire, a modern municipal division was introduced in the re-established Austrian Silesia. The village as a municipality was subscribed to the political district of Cieszyn and the legal district of Jablunkov. According to censuses conducted in 1880, 1890, 1900 and 1910, the population of the municipality grew from 2,112 in 1880 to 2,245 in 1910, with the majority being native Polish-speakers (between 98.2% and 99.5%), accompanied by German-speaking (at most 33 or 1.5% in 1890) and Czech-speaking people (at most 15 or 0.7% in 1880). In terms of religion, in 1910, the majority were Roman Catholics (93.9%), followed by Protestants (5.9%) and Jews (6 people). The village was also traditionally inhabited by Silesian Gorals, speaking Jablunkov dialect.

After World War I, the fall of Austria-Hungary, the Polish–Czechoslovak War and the division of Cieszyn Silesia in 1920, it became a part of Poland and was transferred to Cieszyn County. It was then annexed by Nazi Germany at the beginning of World War II. After the war, it was restored to Poland.

Archival views of Istebna

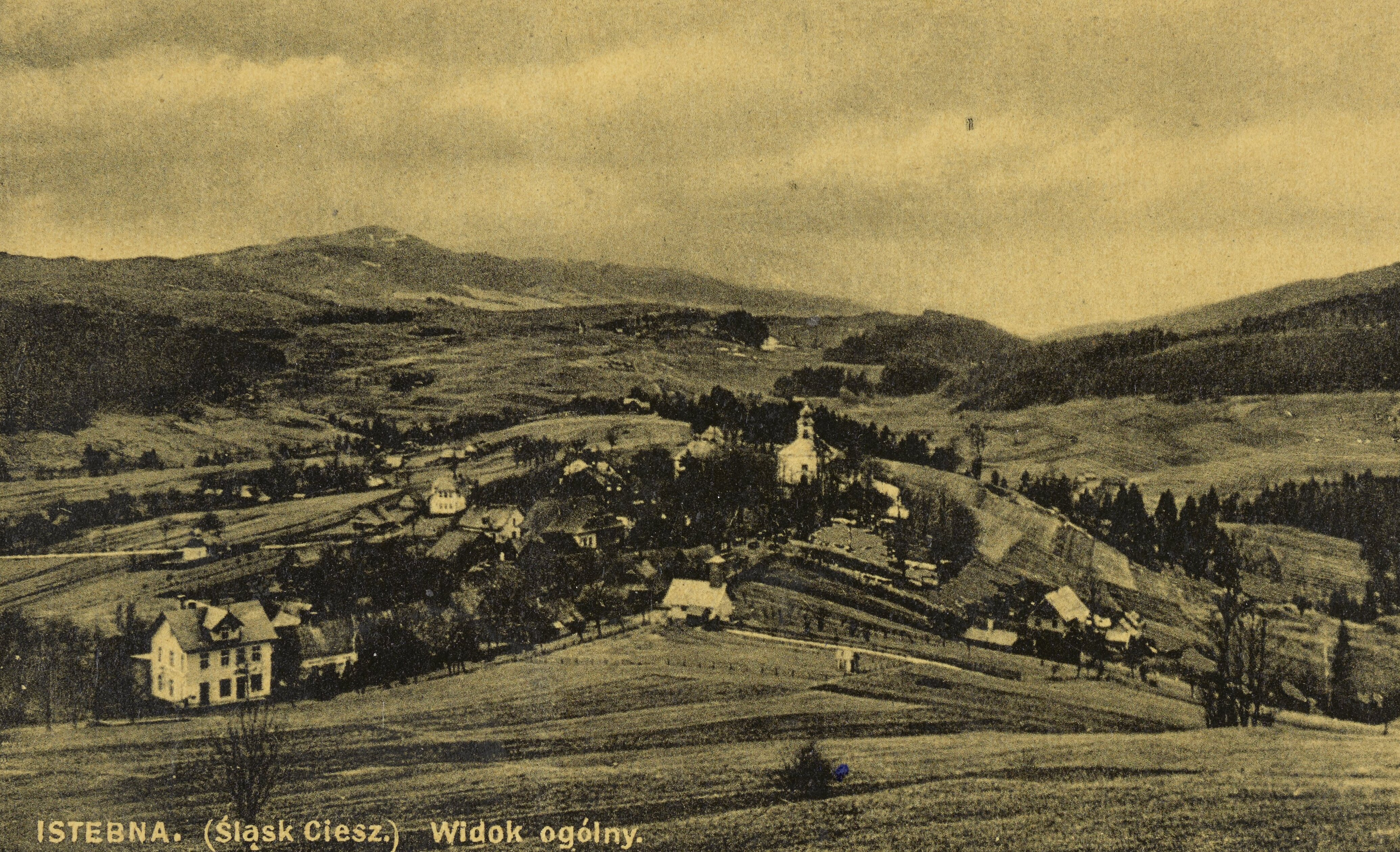
General view before 1937

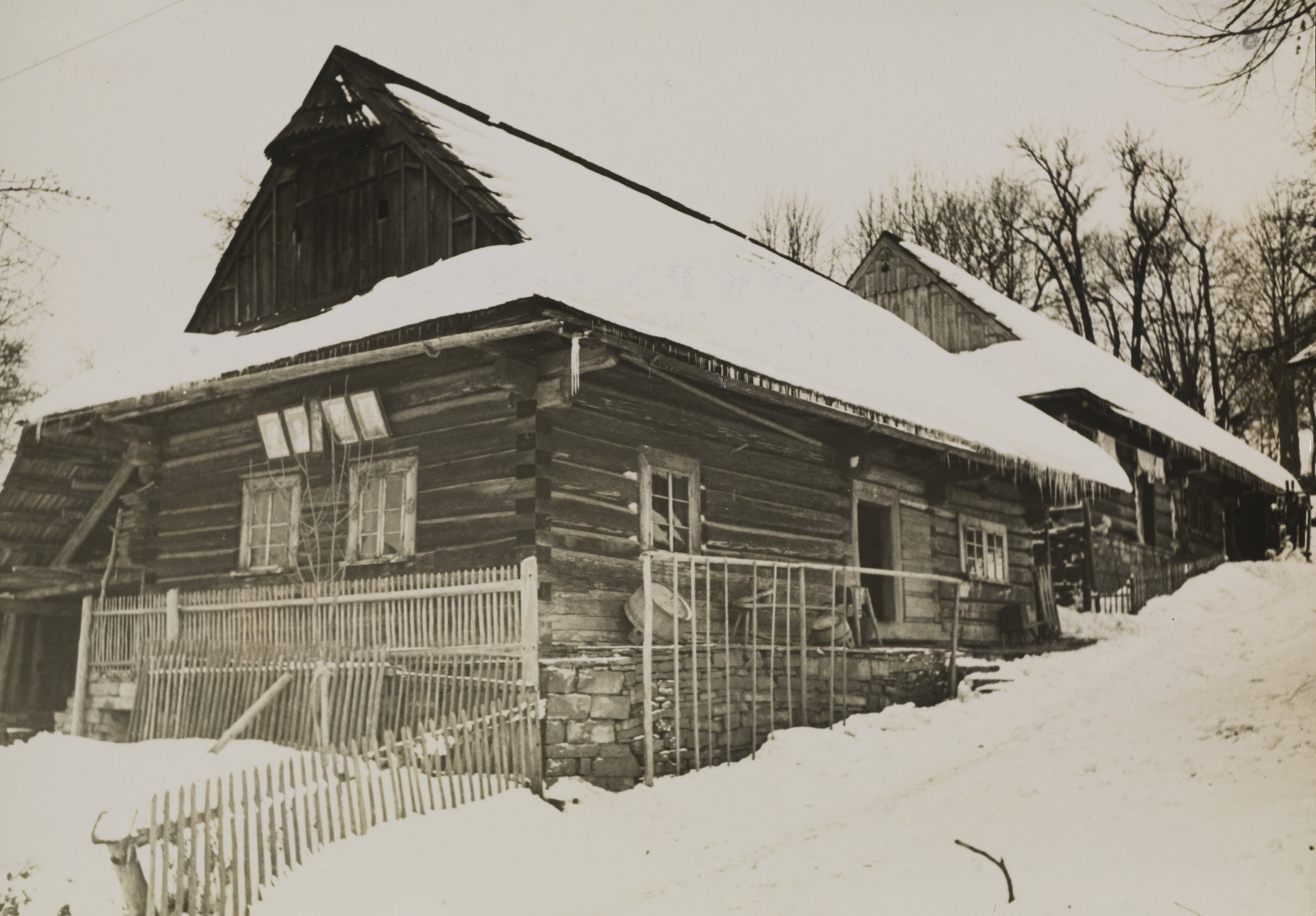
Highlander cottages, circa 1937

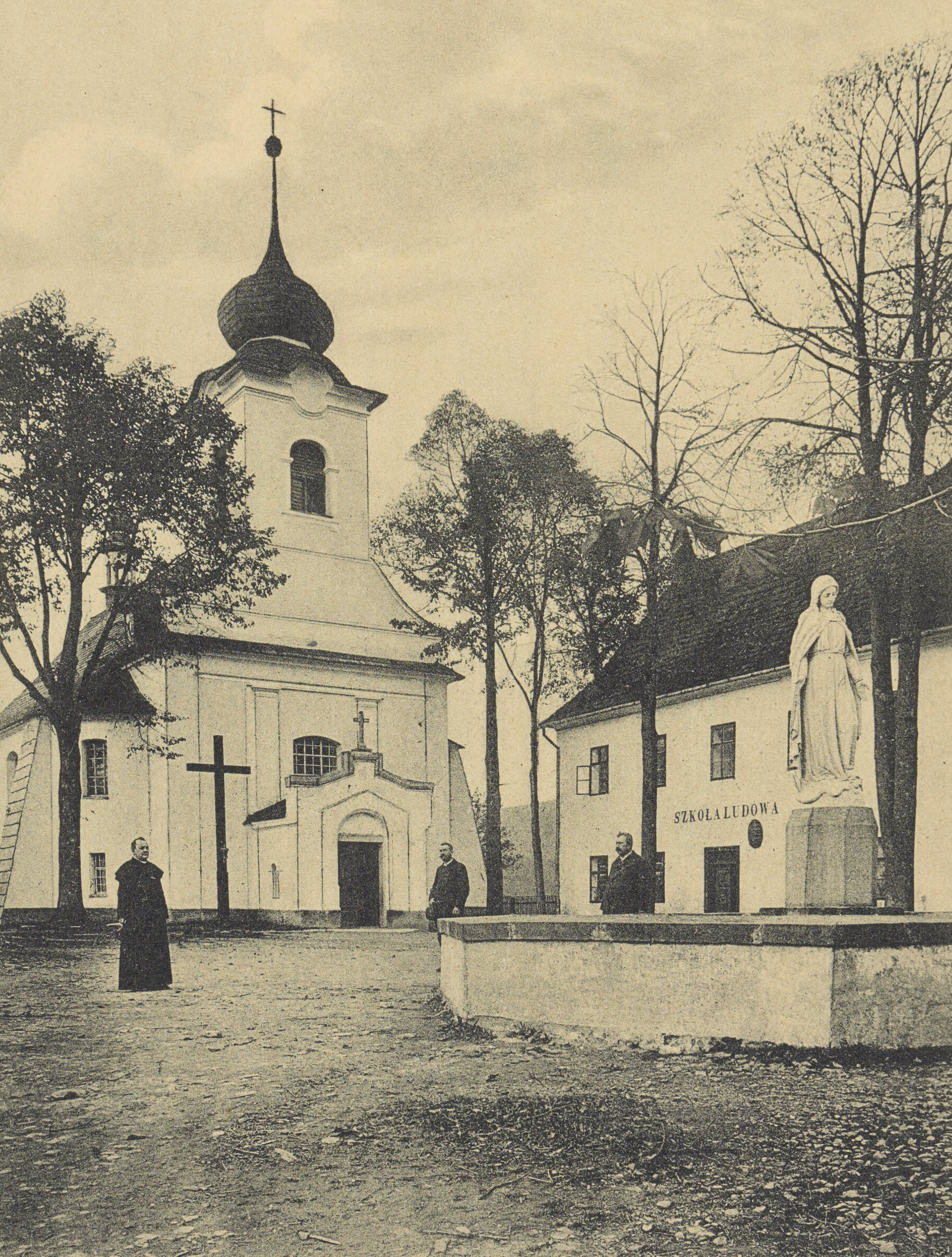
Church of the Good Shepherd, before 1931

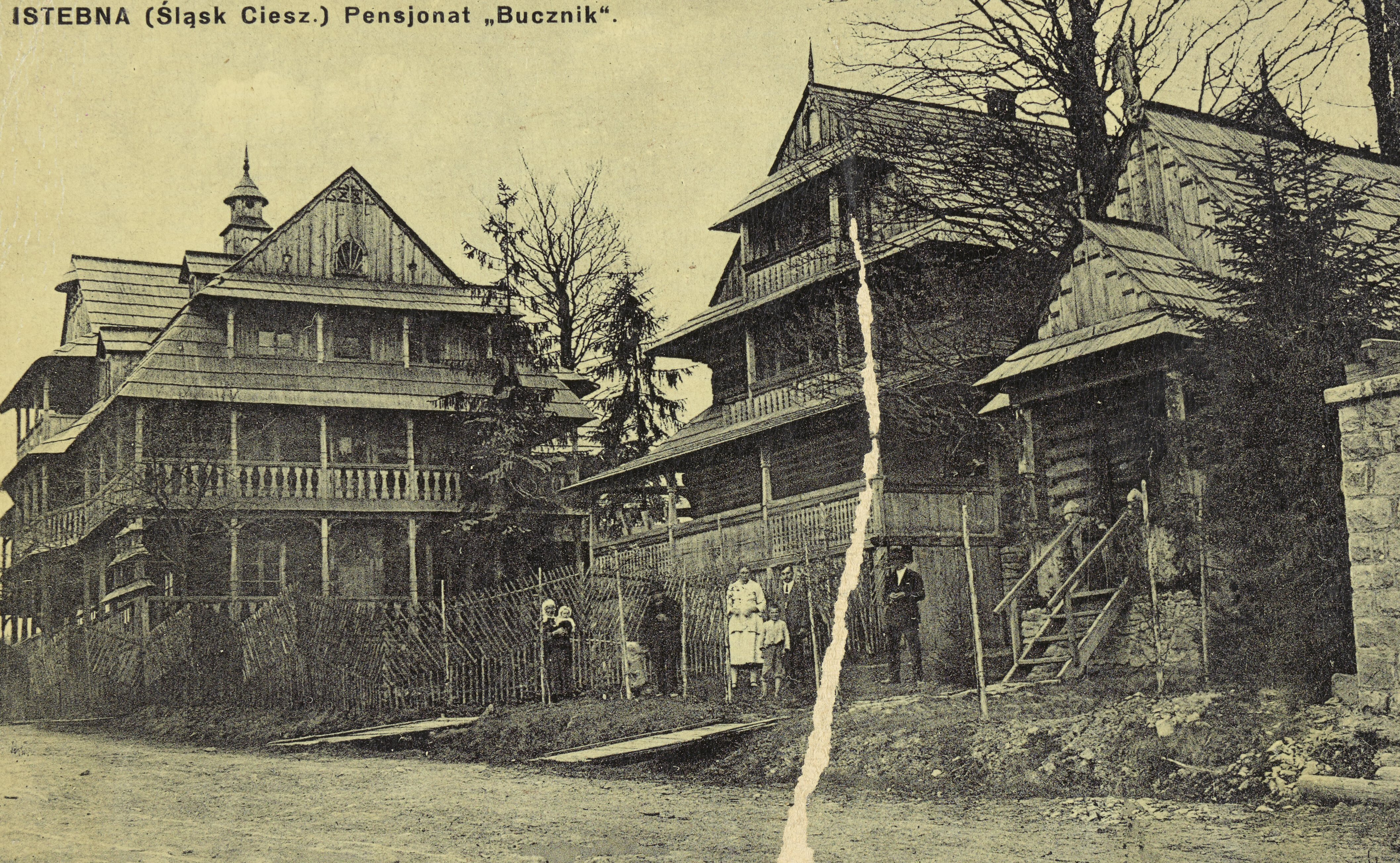
"Bucznik" guesthouse, before 1936

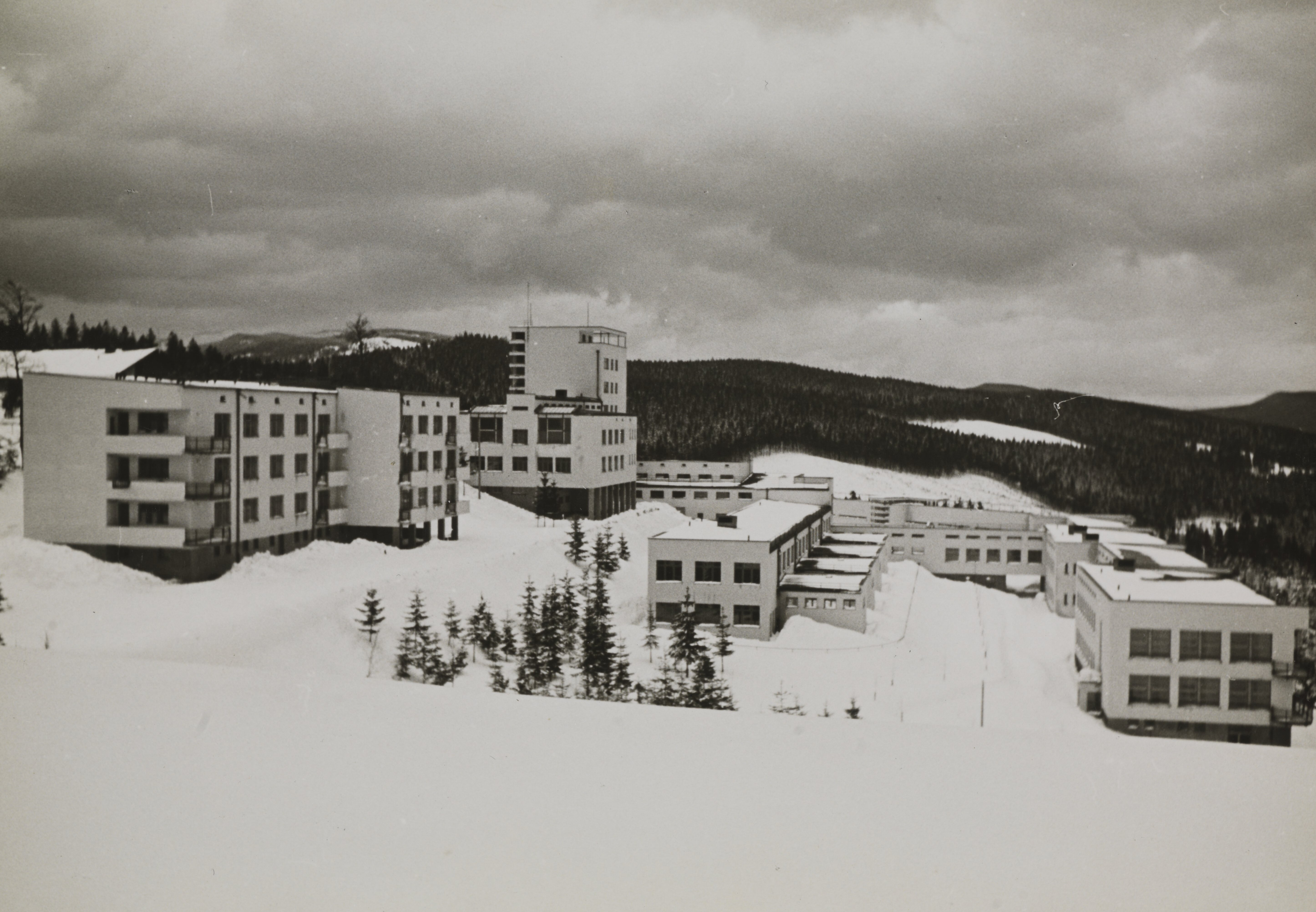
Sanatorium on Kubalonka, before 1939

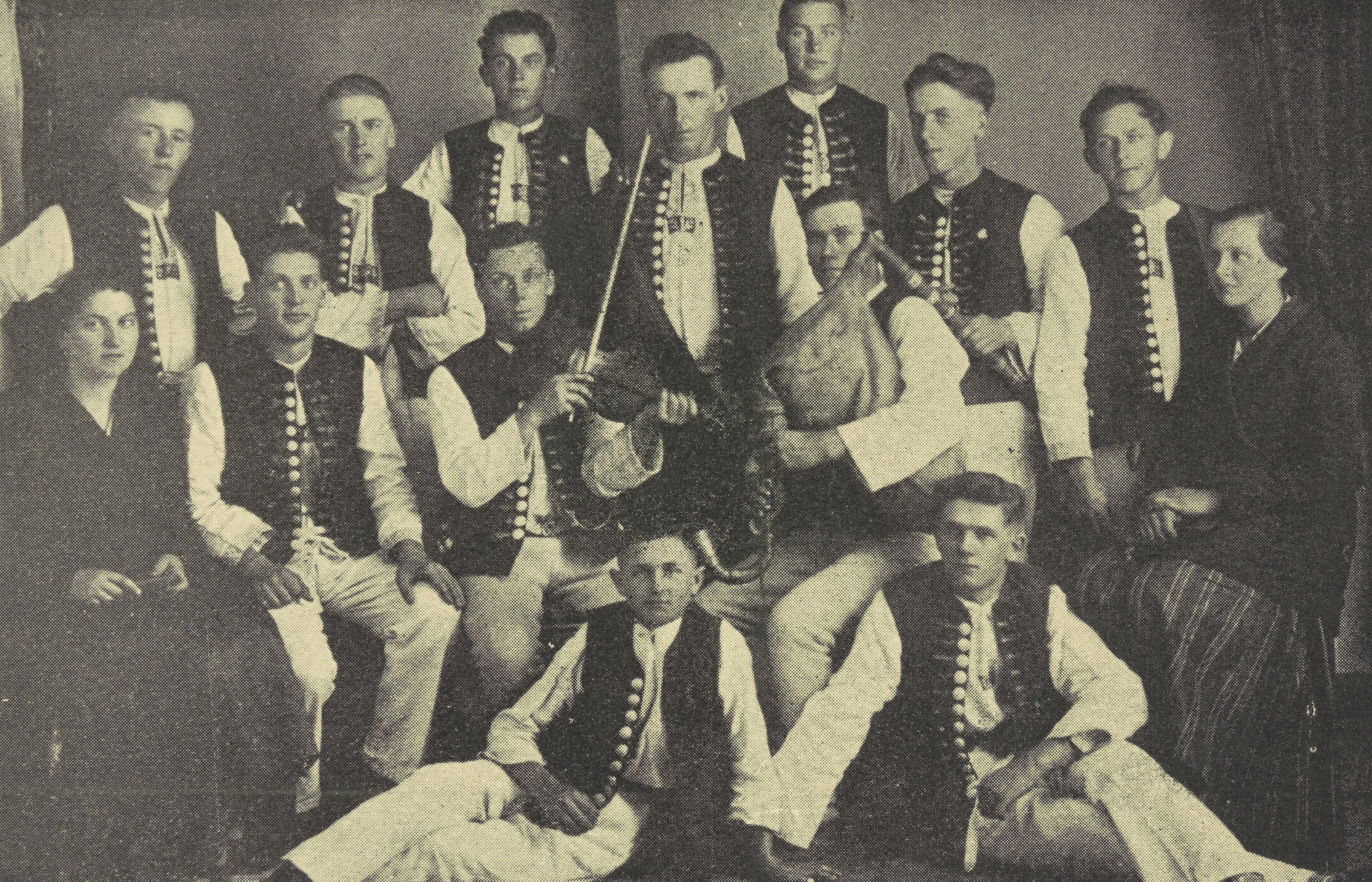
A group of highlanders, after 1906

== Landmarks ==
There is a Catholic church in the village known as the Good Shepherd Church, built in 1794 from the previous wooden one.

== Notable people ==
- Emanuel Grim, Catholic priest and writer, worked here and is buried at local cemetery
- Ludwik Konarzewski-junior, Polish painter, sculptor and also artistic educator of children (son of senior)
- Ludwik Konarzewski-senior, Polish painter, sculptor and also educator of fine arts to young people in Istebna
- Janusz Krężelok, cross-country skier
- Jerzy Kukuczka, high altitude mountaineer, and the second person to climb all of the 8,000 metre peaks (a memorial chamber dedicated to him is located in its own mountain cottage in Istebna)
- Jan Wałach, drawer, engraver (woodcuts), also sculptor and painter

== Twin towns ==
- (Poland) Iława
- (Poland) Trzebiatów

== Gallery ==
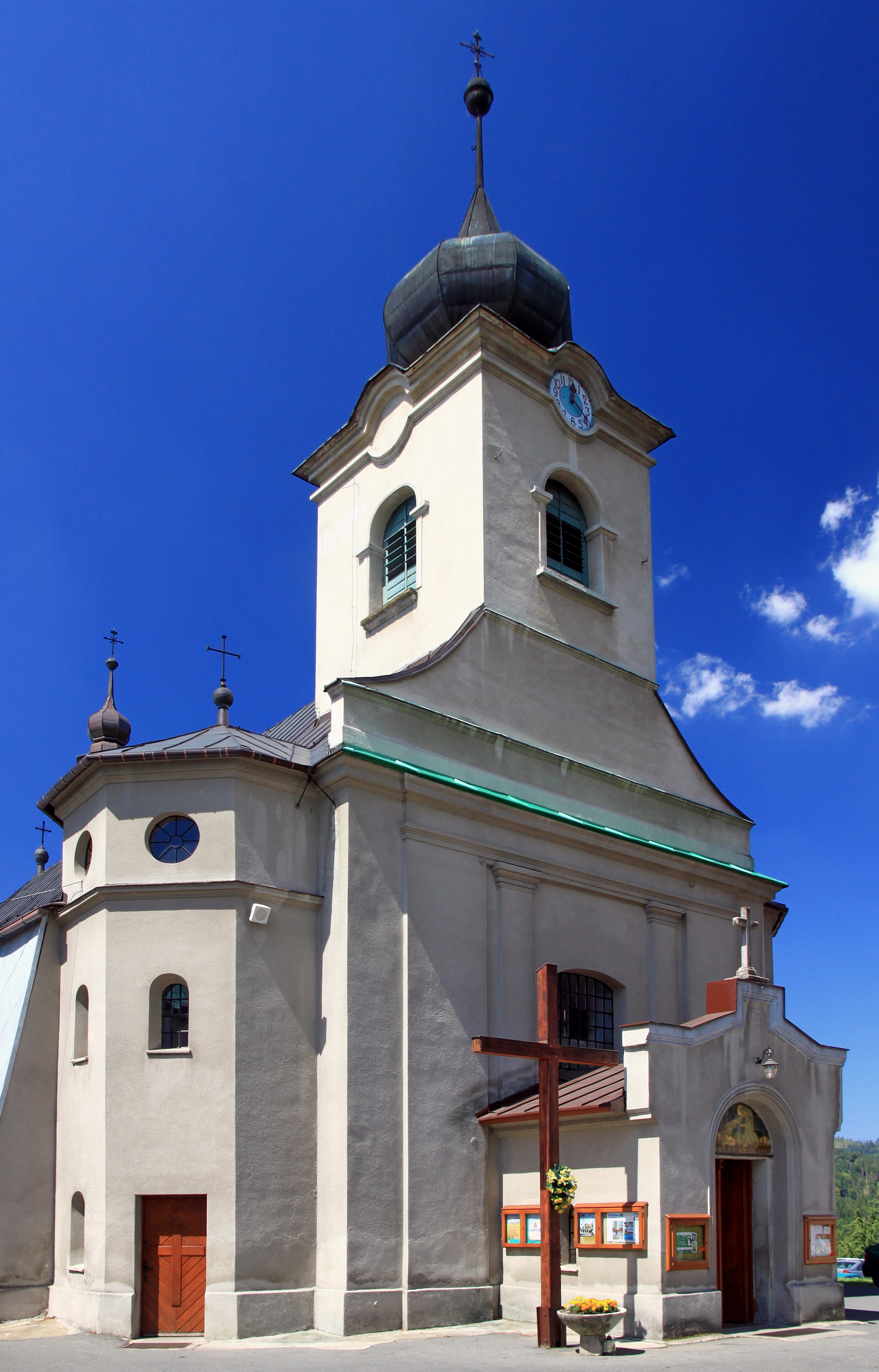
Good Shepherd parish church

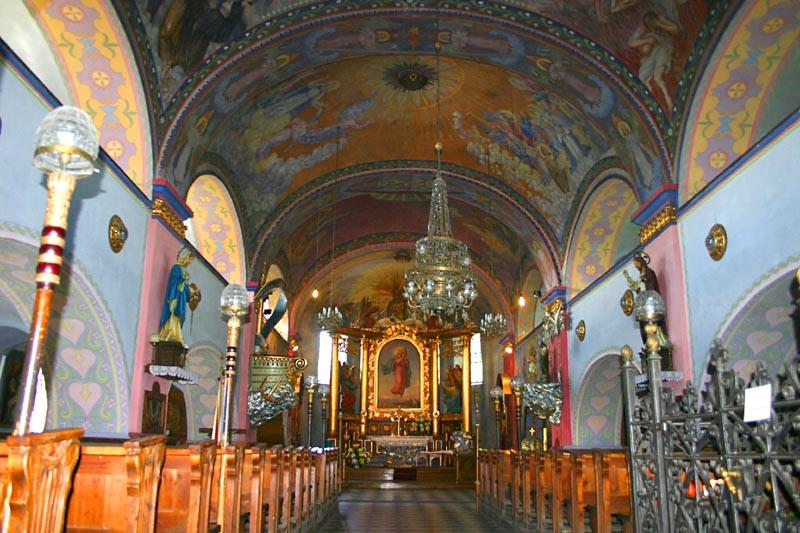
Interior of the Good Shepherd church

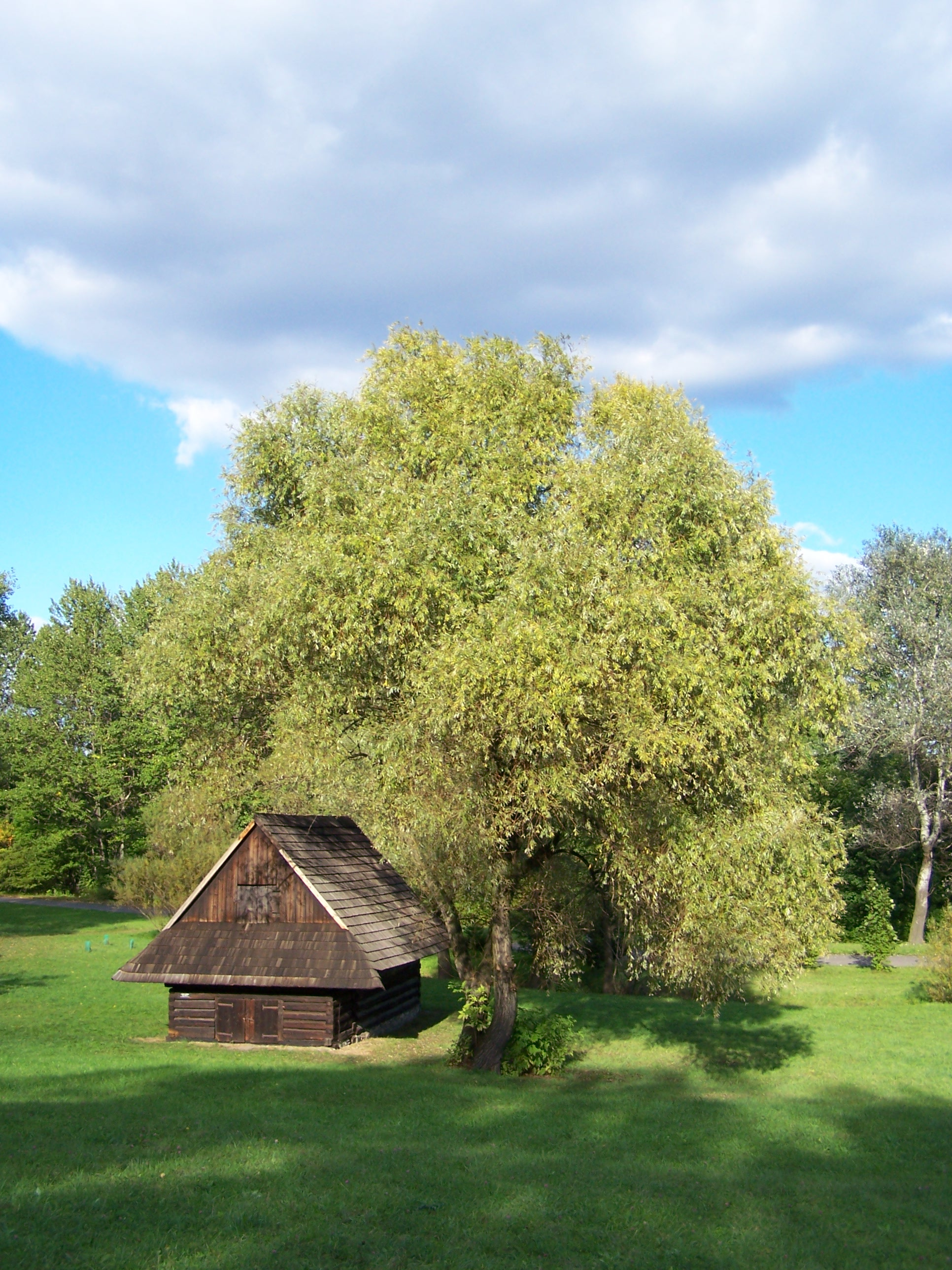
Building in Upper Silesian Ethnographic Park

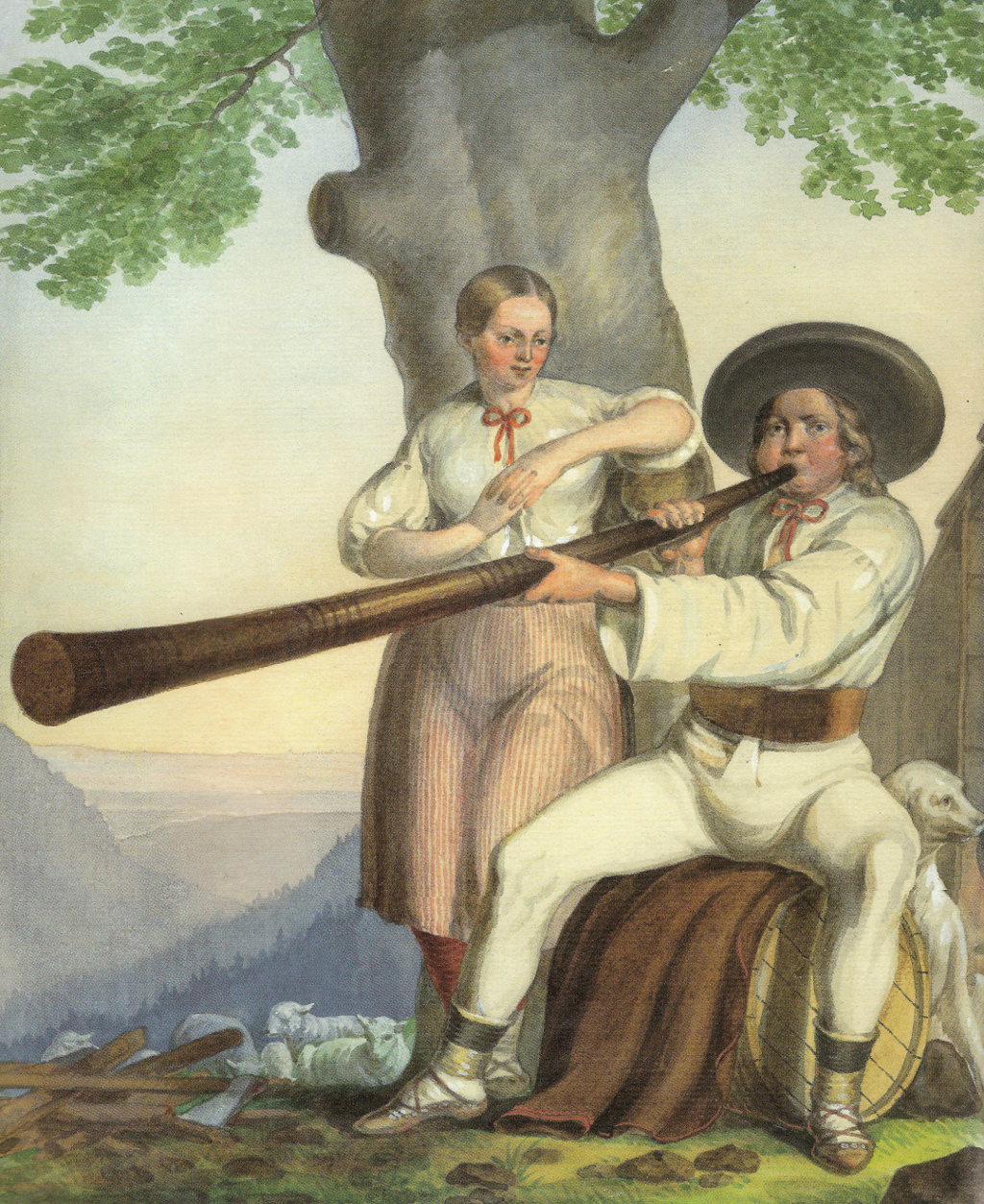
Para góralska z Istebnej, by Henryk Jastrzembski, (1846)

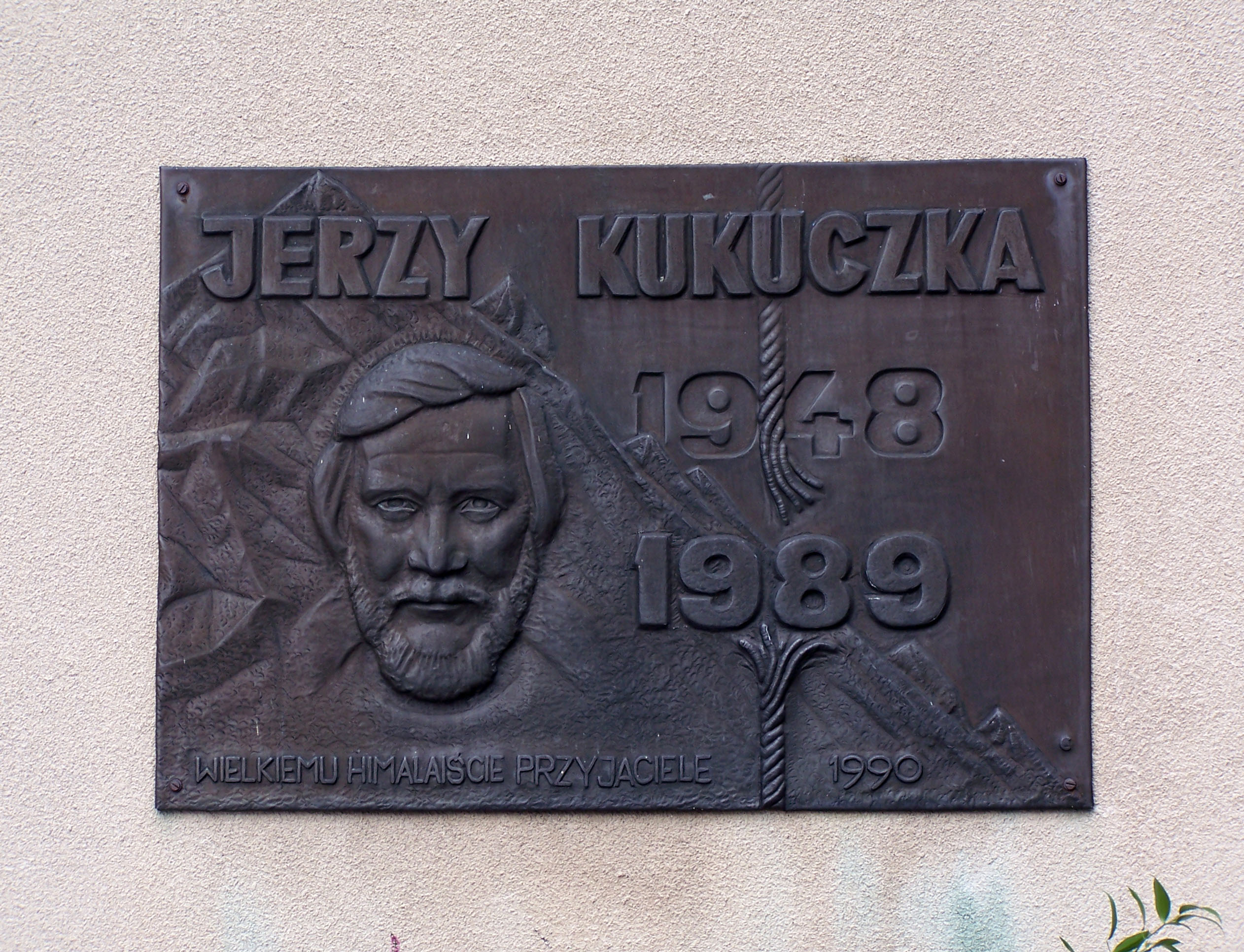
Memorial plaque Jerzy Kukuczka in Istebna
