= Ewa (given name) =

Ewa is a feminine given name in Eastern Europe and a feminine given name specifically in Poland, the Polish counterpart of English Eve or Latin Eva.

People with the name include:

== Art ==
- Ewa Juszkiewicz (born 1984), Polish painter
- Ewa Pachucka (1936–2020), Polish-Australian textile artist and sculptor
- Ewa Partum (born 1945), Polish artist
- Ewa Tarsia (born 1959), Polish-Canadian digital artist
- Ewa Zawadzka (born 1950), Polish graphic artist

== Music ==
- Ewa Demarczyk (1941–2020), Polish singer
- Ewa Farna (born 1993), Polish-Czech pop-rock singer
- Ewa Kupiec (born 1964), Polish pianist
- Ewa Malas-Godlewska (born 1957), Polish soprano
- Ewa Müller (born 1984), birth name of German rapper Schwesta Ewa
- Ewa Plonka (born 1982), Polish mezzo-soprano
- Ewa Podleś (born 1952), Polish coloratura contralto
- Ewa Sonnet (born 1985), Polish model and singer
- Ewa Strusińska (born 1976), Polish conductor

== Politics ==
- Ewa Björling (born 1961), Swedish politician
- Ewa Janik (born 1948), Polish politician
- Ewa Junczyk-Ziomecka (born 1949), Consul General of Poland in New York City
- Ewa Kierzkowska (born 1964), Polish politician
- Ewa Klamt (born 1950), German politician
- Ewa Kopacz (born 1956), 15th prime minister of Poland
- Ewa Malik (born 1961), Polish politician
- Ewa Monika Mes (born 1951), Polish politician
- Ewa Sowińska (born 1944), Polish politician

== Sport ==
- Ewa Ambroziak (born 1950), Polish rower
- Ewa Brodnicka (born 1984), Polish boxer
- Ewa Durska (born 1977), Polish Paralympic shot putter
- Ewa Gryziecka (born 1948), Polish javelin thrower
- Ewa Kasprzyk (born 1957), Polish sprinter
- Ewa Kłobukowska (born 1946), Polish sprinter
- Ewa Kuls-Kusyk (born 1991), Polish luger
- Ewa Laurance (born 1964), Swedish-American pool player
- Ewa Malewicka (1955–1995), Polish speed skater
- Ewa Mizdal (born 1987), Polish weightlifter
- Ewa Olliwier (1904–1955), Swedish diver
- Ewa Pajor (born 1996), Polish footballer
- Ewa Palies (born 1989), British handball player
- Ewa Piątkowska (born 1984), Polish boxer
- Ewa Rybak (born 1974), Polish javelin thrower
- Ewa Rydell (born 1942), Swedish gymnast
- Ewa Wasilewska (born 1967), Polish speed skater
- Ewa Wiśnierska (born 1971), German paraglider
- Ewa Zielińska (born 1972), Polish Paralympic long jumper and sprinter

== Television and film ==
- Ewa Aulin (born 1950), Swedish actress and one time winner of Miss Teen Sweden
- Ewa Błaszczyk (born 1955), Polish actress
- Ewa Da Cruz (born 1976), Norwegian-American actress
- Ewa Dałkowska (1947–2025), Polish actress
- Ewa Drzyzga (born 1967), Polish journalist and television personality
- Ewa Fröling (born 1952), Swedish actress
- Ewa Gawryluk (born 1967), Polish actress
- Ewa Kasprzyk (born 1957), Polish actress
- Ewa Krzyżewska (1939–2003), Polish actress
- Ewa Petelska (1920–2013), Polish filmmaker
- Ewa Serwa (born 1956), Polish actress
- Ewa Strömberg (1940–2013), Swedish actress
- Ewa Wiśniewska (born 1942), Polish actress
- Ewa Ziętek (born 1953), Polish actress

== Writing and journalism ==
- Ewa Białołęcka (born 1967), Polish fantasy writer
- Ewa Milewicz (born 1948), Polish journalist
- Ewa Nowak (born 1966), Polish writer
- Ewa Szelburg-Zarembina (1899–1986), Polish writer

== Other fields ==
- Ewa Bąkowska (1962–2010), Polish librarian and activist
- Ewa Kubicka, Polish mathematician
- Ewa Kurek (born 1951), Polish historian
- Ewa Lajer-Burcharth, Polish art historian
- Ewa Ligocka (1947–2022), Polish mathematician
- Ewa Minge (born 1967), Polish fashion designer
- Ewa Misiak (born 1984), Polish economist
- Ewa Miszewska (1917–1972), Polish Navy officer
- Ewa Paradies (1920–1946), Nazi concentration camp overseer executed for war crimes
- Ewa Józefina Julia Potocka (1818–1895), Polish noble
- Ewa Skoog Haslum (born 1968), Swedish Navy officer
- Ewa Thompson (born 1937), Polish-American slavicist

== Fictional characters ==
- Ewa Cybulska, a fictional Polish woman in the 2013 film The Immigrant

== See also ==
- Eva (name)
- Eve (name)
