= List of Polish women artists =

This is a list of women artists who were born in Poland or whose artworks are closely associated with that country.

== A ==
- Magdalena Abakanowicz (1930–2017), sculptor, fiber artist
- Zofia Atteslander (1874–1928), painter
- Maess Anand (born 1982), drawing artist

== B ==
- Zofia Baltarowicz-Dzielińska (1894–1970), sculptor
- Dora Bianka (c. 1895–1979), painter, illustrator; lived in France
- Goshka (Malgorzata) Bialek (born 1958), sculptor, educator and researcher
- Anna Bilińska-Bohdanowicz (1857–1893), portrait painter
- Elisa Bloch (1848–c.1904), sculptor
- Olga Boznańska (1865–1940), painter
- Ewa Braun (born 1944), decorator, costume designer
- Fredda Brilliant (1903–1999), sculptor, actress
- Bogna Burska (born 1974), installation artist, playwright
- Alicja Buławka-Fankidejska (born 1983), ceramist

== C ==
- Iwona Chmielewska (born 1960), author and illustrator
- Halina Chrostowska (1929–1990), visual artist, printmaker, educator, activist
- Ewa Ciepielewska (born 1960), painter, performance artist, activist

== D ==
- Krystyna Dąbrowska (1906–1944), sculptor, painter
- Maria Dulębianka (1861–1919), painter, portraitist
- Dorota Dziekiewicz-Pilich (born 1969), sculptor, drawing artist

== G ==
- Wiktoria Goryńska (1902–1945), painter, graphic artist, book illustrator.
- Małgorzata Dawidek Gryglicka (born 1976), contemporary artist, writer

== H ==
- Esther Hamerman (1886–1977), Polish-American painter

== J ==
- Zuzanna Janin (born 1961), visual artist
- Bronisława Janowska (1868–1953), painter, publisher
- Jadwiga Janus (1931–2019), sculptor
- Danuta Joppek (born 1955), painter
- Ewa Juszkiewicz (born 1984), painter

== K ==
- Kali (1918–1998), Polish-American painter
- Anna Kamieńska-Łapińska (1932–2007), sculptor, animator
- Stanisława de Karłowska (1876–1952), painter
- Katarzyna Kobro (1898–1951), Russian-born Polish sculptor
- Urszula Kolaczkowska (1911–2009), textile artist
- Halina Korn (1902–1978), painter, sculptor, writer
- Chana Kowalska (1899–1942), Jewish Polish painter and writer
- Katarzyna Kozyra (born 1963), video artist

== L ==
- Małgorzata Turewicz Lafranchi (born 1961), contemporary artist
- Tamara de Lempicka (1898–1980), Art Deco painter
- Maria Magdalena Łubieńska (1833–1920), Polish painter, and founder of an art school in Poland

== M ==
- Goshka Macuga (born 1967), artist
- Barbara Massalska (1927–1980), painter, educator
- Agata Materowicz (born 1963), contemporary artist
- Julie Mihes (1786–1855), painter, lithographer

== N ==
- Dorota Nieznalska (born 1973), visual artist, sculptor

== O ==
- Paulina Olowska (born 1976), contemporary artist

== P ==
- Ewa Pachucka (1936–2020), textile artist and sculptor
- Ewa Partum (born 1945), contemporary artist
- Felka Platek (1899–1944), painter
- Urszula Plewka-Schmidt (1939–2008), tapestry artist

== R ==
- Anna Rajecka (1762–1832), painter
- Zofia Romer (1885–1972), painter
- Hanna Rudzka-Cybisowa (1897–1988), painter

== S ==
- Joanna Salska (active since the 1980s), Polish-American visual artist
- Resia Schor (1910–2006), Polish-American artist
- Maria Seyda (1893–1989), portrait painter
- Iwona Skowron-Dobrowolska (born 1966), painter
- Krystyna Smiechowska (born 1935), painter
- Karina Smigla-Bobinski (born 1967), intermedia contemporary artist
- Anna Sobol-Wejman (born 1946), printmaker
- Monika Sosnowska (born 1972), contemporary artist
- Irena Stankiewicz (born 1925), graphic artist
- Irene Monat Stern (1932–2010), painter
- Zofia Stryjeńska (1891–1976), painter, graphic designer, illustrator, scenographer
- Rahel Szalit-Marcus (1888–1942), painter, illustrator
- Alina Szapocznikow (1926–1973), sculptor
- Zofia Szeptycka (1837–1904), painter, poet

== T ==
- Franciszka Themerson (1907–1988), painter, illustrator, filmmaker
- Joanna Troikowicz (born 1952), sculptor, designer, painter

== U ==
- Helena Unierzyska (1867–1932), painter, sculptor

== W ==
- Aleksandra Waliszewska (born 1976), painter
- Irena Weissowa (1888–1981), painter
- Eva Janina Wieczorek (born 1951), painter
- Katerina Wilczynski (1894–1978), painter and illustrator
- Maria Wodzińska (1819–1896), painter

== Z ==
- Idalia Zagroba (born 1967), printmaker
- Teresa Żarnowerówna (1895–1950), painter, sculptor, scenographer, architect
- Joanna Zastróżna (born 1972), photographer
- Ewa Zawadzka (born 1950), graphic artist
- Wanda Zawidzka-Manteuffel (1906–1994), graphic artist, ceramist
- Mira Żelechower-Aleksiun (born 1941), painter

== See also ==
- List of Polish artists
