= Atteslander =

Atteslander is a surname. Notable people with the surname include:

- Peter Atteslander (1926–2016), Swiss sociologist
- Zofia Atteslander (1874–c. 1928), Polish painter
