= Halina Chrostowska =

Polish visual artist (1929–1990)

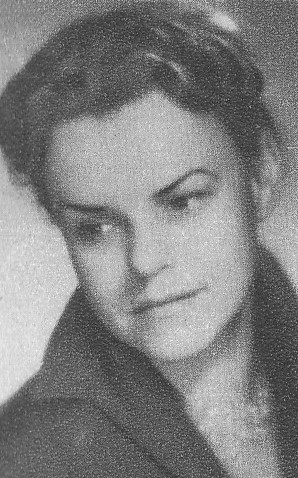
- Halina Chrostowska in the 1960s
- Born: 25 July 1929; Warsaw, Second Polish Republic (now Poland)
- Died: 22 April 1990 (aged 60); Warsaw, Poland
- Burial place: Powązki Cemetery, Warsaw, Poland
- Other names: Halina Chrostowska-Piotrowicz
- Education: Academy of Fine Arts in Warsaw
- Occupation(s): Visual artist, graphic artist, educator, illustrator, printmaker, activist
- Years active: 1946 to 1989
- Father: Stanisław Ostoja-Chrostowski

Halina Chrostowska (25 July 1929 – 22 April 1990), also known as Halina Chrostowska-Piotrowicz, was a Polish visual artist, graphic artist, printmaker, activist, educator, and illustrator.

== Biography ==
Halina Chrostowska was born on 25 July 1929 in Warsaw, Second Polish Republic (now Poland). She was the daughter of noted artist, Stanisław Ostoja-Chrostowski. Chrostowska studied painting and printmaking at the Academy of Fine Arts in Warsaw (1946 to 1950) under Tadeusz Kulisiewicz.

After graduation she taught at the Academy of Fine Arts in Warsaw's faculty of graphic arts from 1950 to 1989. She found a printmaking studio in Warsaw in 1962, which remained open until 1989. Her early work was within the social realism movement, followed by a move towards more formal and technical work. She would combined various printing techniques, such as etchings combined with linocuts and woodcuts. Starting in 1968, she created colored prints, gradually blurring the boundaries between printmaking and painting.

She was a member of the Association of Polish Artists and Designers. Her artwork can be found in the museum collections at the Museum of Modern Art.

== Exhibitions ==
- 1955, International competition and exhibition organized during the 5th World Festival of Youth and Students (2nd prize and silver medal)
- 1959, 1st Biennale of Young Artists, Paris, France
- 1960, 2nd International Graphic Design Biennale, Tokyo (Ohara Museum Prize)
- 1961, 6th São Paulo Art Biennial, São Paulo, Brazil
- 1970, 2nd International Graphic Design Biennale, Florence Biennale, Florence (gold medal)

== See also ==
- List of Polish women artists
