= Ewa Tarsia =

Canadian artist (born 1959)

- Born: 1959; Starogard, Poland
- Education: Tama University
- Known for: artist

Ewa Tarsia RCA (born 1959) is a Polish-Canadian digital artist.

Tarsia was born and raised in Poland, where she graduated from the Gdansk School of Fine Art in 1979 before emigrating to Canada, settling in Winnipeg in 1991. She was inducted into the Royal Canadian Academy of Arts in 2007. In addition to being an artist, Tarsia has worked as a graphic designer and curator. She has received numerous awards and acclaim for her work in gardening, including selection in Winnipeg's 2016 Cool Gardens competition and a 2008 story in Manitoba Gardener Magazine.

== Collections ==
University of North Dakota

Tama University
