= Stanisław Ostoja-Chrostowski =

Polish artist

Olympic medal record

Art competitions
Bronze medal – third place	1936 Berlin	Applied graphics

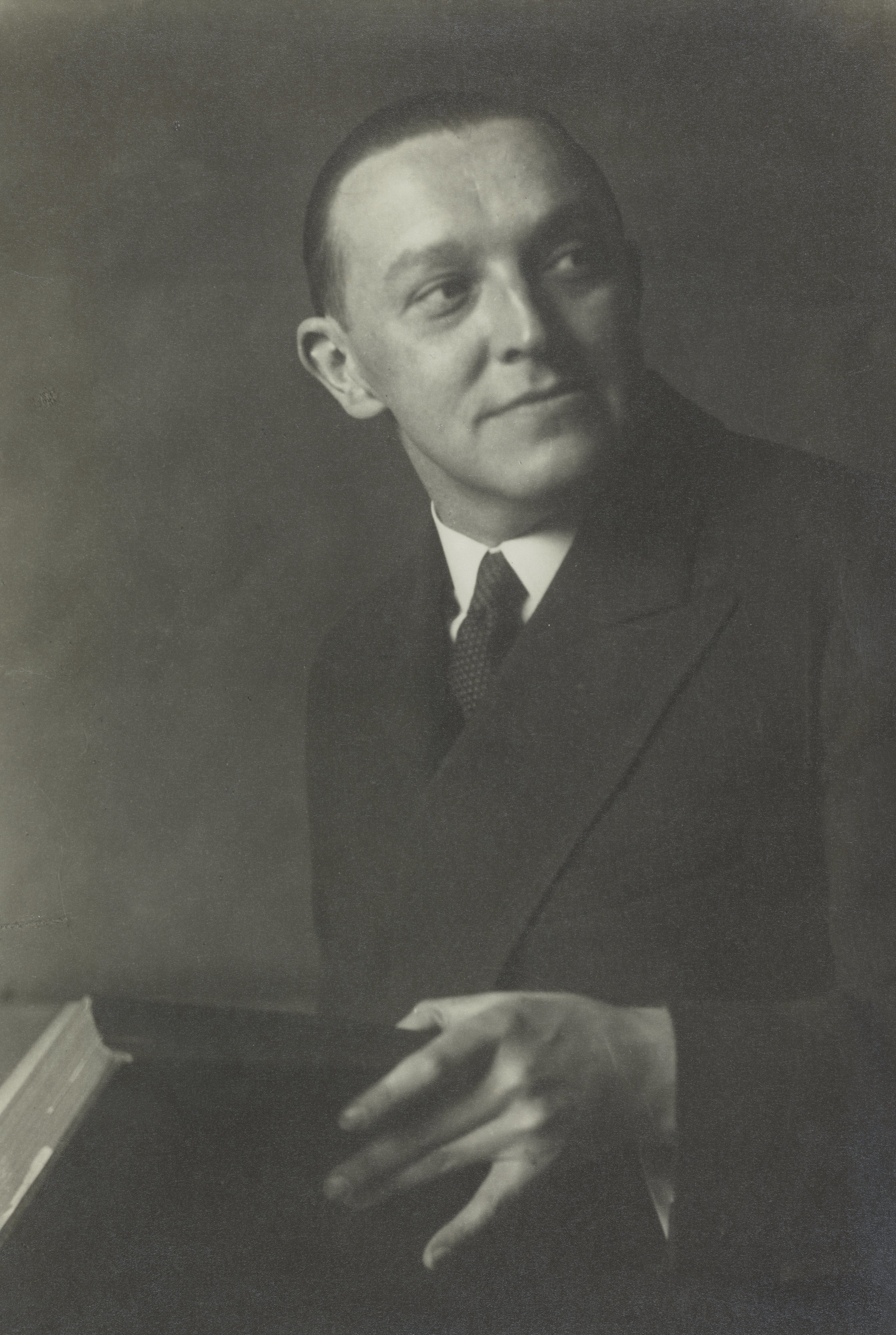
Stanisław Ostoja-Chrostowski in 1930

Stanisław Ostoja-Chrostowski (December 14, 1900 – November 13, 1947) was a Polish painter, woodcut artist and professor at the Warsaw Academy of Fine Arts. He began studying at the School of Fine Arts in Warsaw. He studied painting with Tadeusz Pruszkowski, woodcut with Władysław Skoczylas and commercial art with Edmund Bartłomiejczyk.

In 1936 he won a bronze medal in the art competitions of the Olympic Games for his "Dyplom Yacht Klubu" ("Yachting Club Certificate").

During World War II, he was active in the intelligence department of the underground Polish Home Army. After the war, he was elected as the rector of the rebuilt Academy of Fine Arts in Warsaw. He was father of artist Halina Chrostowska.
