= Ewa Nowak =

Polish writer, teacher, therapist and journalist

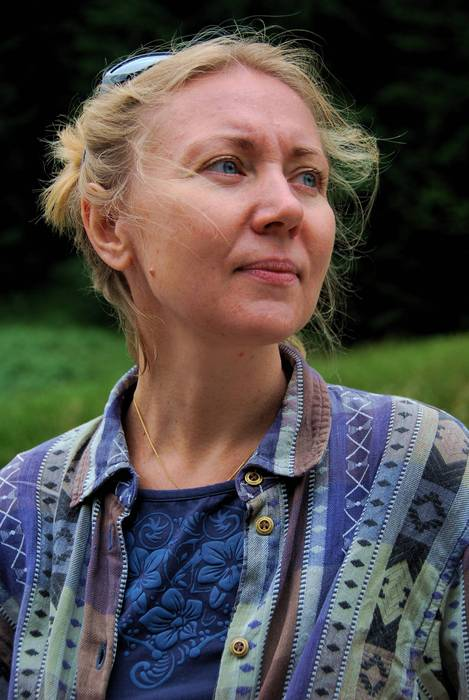
- Born: 21 December 1966 (age 59); Warsaw, Poland

Ewa Nowak (born 21 December 1966 in Warsaw) is a Polish writer, teacher, therapist and journalist. She has published over thirty novels.

== Biography ==
Ewa Nowak was born in a family of teachers and grew up in a Warsaw district Powiśle. She graduated from Academy of Special Education in Warsaw. She worked as a teacher and therapist.

== Career ==
She made her writing debut in 1997 in "Filipika " with a text about passing oral exams titled 100% effectiveness.

In 2002, Pracownia Słów published her debut novel entitled Anything but mint. The writer has worked with the following publishing houses: Czarna Owca, Egmont, Greg, HarperCollins, Prószyński i S-ka, Słowne, Wydawnictwo Literackie.

One of the most important topics that Ewa Nowak tackled is the topic of children's love, which had not been discussed in Polish literature so far. For her book Spider on a Bike, she received a distinction in the 1st Children's Literature Competition. Halina Skrobiszewska. Another important topic discussed by the author is the issue of psychological violence in youth relationships. In 2009, her novel Very White Crow received the title of Book of the Year of the Association of Friends of Books for the Young (Polish Section of IBBY ). The title of Book of the Year of the Polish Section of IBBY (2020) was also awarded to the novel Orkan Depresja, which deals with depression among teenagers. The latter novel was also included in the list of White Ravens of the International Youth Library.

Nowak's most important theme is psychological violence among young people. Nowak also discusses difficult choices, overcoming weaknesses, natural problems with distinguishing goodness and evil, consequences of thoughtlessness, family feuds, mental weaknesses and physical disabilities.

She writes for the newspapers Cogito, Victor Gimnazjalista, Victor Junior, Trzynastka, Sens.

== Selected works ==
- Wszystko, tylko nie mięta (Warsaw 2002, 2005, 2012)
- Diupa (Warsaw 2002, 2005, 2012)
- Krzywe 10 (Warsaw 2003)
- Lawenda w chodakach (Warsaw 2004, 2012)
- Chłopak Beaty (Warsaw 2004, 2008)
- Cztery łzy (Warsaw 2004, 2008)
- Lina Karo (Warsaw 2004, 2010)
- Furteczki (Warsaw 2004, 2010)
- Piątki (Warsaw 2004, 2010)
- Nasze (Warsaw 2004)
- Drugi (Warsaw 2005, 2013)
- Prawie czarodziejki (Warsaw 2005)
- Michał Jakiśtam (Warsaw 2006, 2013)
- Ogon Kici (Warsaw 2006, 2013)
- Koleżaneczki (Warsaw 2006, 2011)
- Prawie czarodziejki II (Warsaw 2006)
- Środek kapusty (Warsaw 2006, 2012)
- Kiedyś na pewno (Warsaw 2007, 2013)
- Lisia (Warsaw 2007, 2013)
- Piotruś Kita (Warsaw 2007)
- Pajączek na rowerze (Warsaw 2008)
- Rezerwat niebieskich ptaków (Warsaw 2008, 2013)
- Yellow Bahama w prążki (Warsaw 2009)
- Bardzo biała wrona (Warsaw 2009, 2013)
- Skorpion i koń dziąsło (Warsaw 2010)
- Niewzruszenie (Warsaw 2010)
- Dane wrażliwe (Warsaw 2011)
- Szarka (Warsaw 2012)
- Drzazga (Warsaw 2012)
- Pułapka na ktosia (Warsaw 2013)
- Bransoletka (Cracow 2013)
- Mój Adam (Warsaw 2013)
- Apollo 11 (Warsaw 2014)
- Noga w szufladzie, czyli domowa historia szpiegowska (Warsaw 2014)
- Dwie Marysie (Warsaw, 2014)
