= Ewa Kurek =

Polish historian

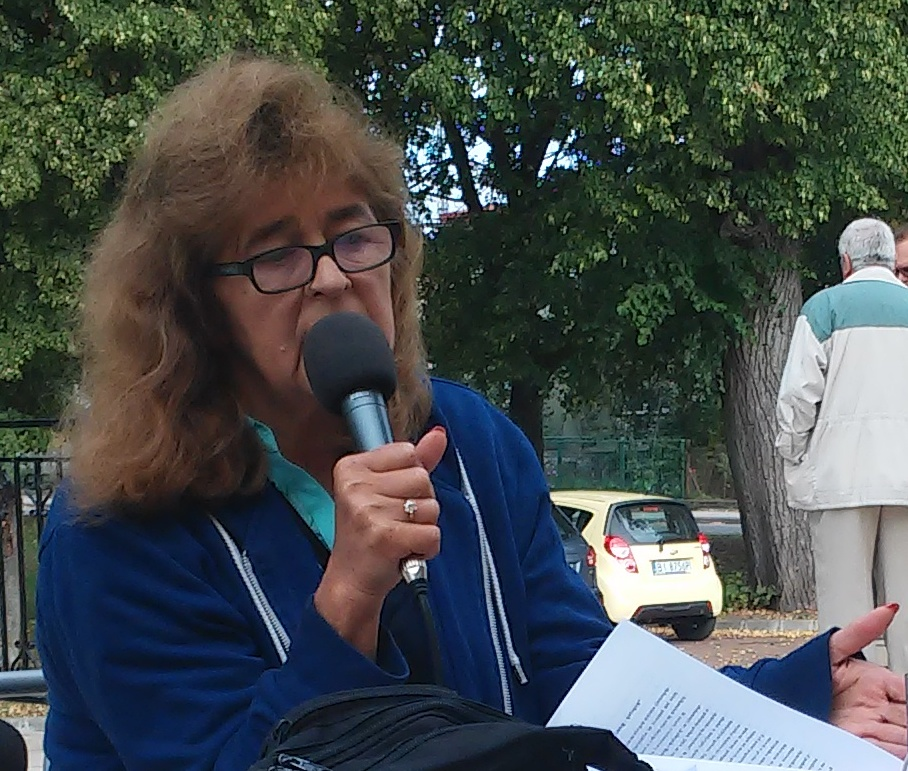
Ewa Kurek interviewed, 2015, by Polish Radio WNET

Ewa Janina Kurek (also Ewa Kurek-Lesik; born 24 November 1951 in Kielce) is a Polish historian specializing in Polish-Jewish history during World War II. She has been associated with the far-right, and her revisionist views regarding the Holocaust in Poland have been widely categorized as indicative of antisemitism and Holocaust denial.

== Education and career ==
From 1971 to 1977, Ewa Kurek studied history at the Catholic University of Lublin, gaining a master's degree in 1979 and later a Ph.D. from the John Paul II Catholic University of Lublin on the rescue of Jews by Polish nuns under the supervision of Władysław Bartoszewski. She edited the underground NSZZ Solidarność FSC Information Bulletin in Lublin and collaborated with the underground Spotkania and with Polish and American scholars and press. She has been a lecturer at the Humanities-Economy Academy in Łódź and at the Higher School of Learning in Kielce.

== Works ==
=== Cursed Soldiers ===
In 1995, Kurek published Zaporczycy, 1943-1949 about the "cursed soldiers". The family of one of the subjects objected to the accuracy of his alleged links with the communist security apparatus, and filed a suit — consequently, the second edition dropped pertinent fragments.

=== Pole Nuns and Jew Children ===
In 1997, Kurek published an English translation of her dissertation thesis —Your Life Is Worth Mine: How Polish Nuns Saved Hundreds of Jewish Children in German-Occupied Poland, 1939-1945 — from Hippocrene Books; it carried an introduction by Jan Karski. Barbara Tepa Lupack, found her account "compelling and historically significant" but took issue with her analysis; Kurek "oversimplified both the nuns' attitudes towards their Jewish charges and the Polish Jews' attitudes towards their own impending doom."

In 2001, she expanded on her dissertation and published Dzieci żydowskie w klasztorach. Udział żeńskich zgromadzeń zakonnych w akcji ratowania dzieci żydowskich w Polsce w latach 1939–1945 (Jewish Children in Convents. The Participation of Nuns' Congregations in the Rescue Operation of Jewish Children in Poland Between 1939 and 1945). Joanna Michlic, a historian specializing in Polish-Jewish history and the Holocaust, noted Kurek's chapter on the postwar recovery of the children to offer a "rather biased perspective colored by anti-Jewish prejudices" — she implied that the Jewish children would have been "better off" had they been left in the hands of Polish convents and families, and blamed Jewish organizations and individuals for traumatic changes in the children's lives, rather than the war and the genocidal destruction of Jewish families. Her assumptions were questionable from historical as well as moral points of view.

=== Polish-Jewish Relationship ===
In 2006, Kurek submitted her habilitation dissertation titled Poza granicą solidarności: Stosunki polsko-żydowskie, 1939–1945 ("Beyond the Border of Solidarity: Polish-Jewish relations, 1939-1945") to John Paul II Catholic University of Lublin but was summarily rejected. It was published by Kielcke in 2006.

Michlic finds the work to present Jewish-Polish relations as a conflict between incompatible civilizations. Kurek's interpretation of ghetto development in German-occupied Poland — where she suggested that ghettos "were essentially autonomous Jewish provinces built ... by Polish Jews with the approval of the German occupation authorities", and that the Jews "for the first time in over 2,000 years built their own framework of sovereignty" — was described as "outlandish" by Laurence Weinbaum; he found her work as "another troubling development" in the context of a "conservative clerical culture" and rising anti-semitism that followed the 2005 election of Lech Kaczyński as president.

== Views ==
In 2016, Kurek circulated a petition calling for exhumation of the victims of the Jedwabne pogrom — academics agree that the pogrom was committed by local Poles with active support of the Nazi state apparatus but far-right Polish nationalists challenge the involvement of Poles and deny culpability. A couple of years later, in the aftermath of the Amendment to the Act on the Institute of National Remembrance, that penalized any public speech which attributes responsibility for the Holocaust to Poland, Kurek expressed elation about the Poles becoming increasingly aware of the abuse perpetrated upon them by the Jews.

Later, in 2018, across multiple speeches delivered across the United States, she accused Poland's urban Jews of collaborating with Nazis during the Holocaust against Hasidic Jews; days later, she absolved native Poles of any responsibility for the purge of Jews in 1968. In March 2020, she claimed that the 2020 coronavirus pandemic in Europe was a weapon used to replace "Western Christian culture" with Jewish culture, and that Western Europe was controlled by "Jewish conglomerates".

== Reception ==
Havi Dreifuss, a historian and head of the Center for Research on the Holocaust in Poland at Yad Vashem, finds Kurek to have distorted Jewish-Polish history in a bid to spread hate. According to David Silberklang, editor-in-chief of Yad Vashem Studies, she might be the only legitimate Holocaust scholar to have become a Holocaust revisionist or distorter later; while David Irving could be considered as a precedent, he lacked the academic credentials. However, both Irving and Berel Lang emphasize that Kurek is not a denialist in the traditional sense; she doesn't deny the genocide but argues rather that the Jews were complicit with the Nazis.

Aleksandra Hadzelek finds Kurek's scholarship to be a representative example of the nationalist developments in Polish politics that had birthed a vigorous one-dimensional emphasis on Polish help to Jews during the War than a nuanced study of the variety of Polish attitudes; this new wave of scholarship primarily depended on singular personal accounts than archival sources. Katka Reszke concurs that Kurek's scholarship exhibit a disingenous cherry-picking of contemporary sources to advocate fringe viewpoints. In 2018, she was scheduled to be awarded by a Polish-American NGO for her work on Jewish history at the Polish consulate in New York; however, following media criticism, including from the Simon Wiesenthal Center, the award was withdrawn.

== Bibliography ==
- Kurek, Ewa (1992). The Role of Polish Nuns in the Rescue of Jews, 1939-1945. New York University Press. ISBN 9780814762295.
- Kurek, Ewa (1997). Your Life is Worth Mine: How Polish Nuns Saved Hundreds of Jewish Children in German-occupied Poland, 1939-1945. Hippocrene Books. ISBN 978-0-7818-0409-7., introduction by Jan Karski.
- Kurek, Ewa (2006). Poza granicą solidarności: Stosunki polsko-żydowskie, 1939–1945. Kielcke.
  - self-published in English as Kurek, Ewa (2012). Polish-Jewish Relations, 1939-1945: Beyond the Limits of Solidarity. iUniverse. ISBN 978-1-4759-3832-6.
