= Ewa Plonka =

Polish-American operatic soprano

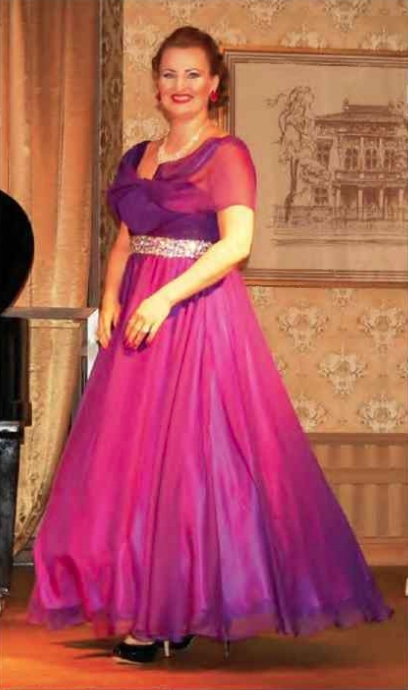
Ewa Płonka in Prudnik, 2014

Ewa Płonka is a Polish-American operatic soprano.

== Biography ==
Born 1982 in Prudnik, Płonka graduated with honors from music schools in Poland including the Academy of Music in Poznań. She studied piano performance in Poland and Norway, as well as at Oklahoma City University and University of Utah, USA, where she received her doctoral degree in piano performance. Płonka studied voice simultaneously in Poland and the United States. She graduated from The Juilliard School with The Artist Diploma in Opera Studies in 2016.

Recent operatic roles have included Azucena from new production of Il Trovatore in Oper Frankfurt, Giovanna Seymour in new production of Anna Bolena in Badisches Staatstheater Karlsruhe, Maddalena from new production of Rigoletto in Oper Frankfurt and Mary from new production of Der Fliegende Hollander in Oper Frankfurt. She has also appeared with the Munich Radio Orchestra and the Nuremberg Symphony Orchestra. She made her first appearance at the Carnegie Hall in 2013. As of 2015–16,

Recently she appeared in Carnegie Hall in Stabat Mater by K. Szymanowski, Wesendonck Lieder by Wagner in Oulu Symphony/Norway and Symphony No. 3 by Mahler in Opera National Orchestra Montpellier. She has won several awards, including first prize at the New Jersey Association of Verismo Opera, the Deborah Voigt special prize at the International Marcello Giordani Singing Competition in 2014, The Gerda Lissner Foundation Vocal Competition in 2014.
