= Julie Mihes =

Polish artist (1786–1855)

Julie Mihes (July 13, 1786 – January 16, 1855) was a Polish painter and lithographer. She was born in Breslau in 1786, and studied in her native city, as well as in Dresden, and at Vienna. Here she was married in 1823 to the custos A. Primisser, after whose death in 1827, she became a nun. She is remembered for reproducing the characteristics of the Old Masters, as in copies of a 'Christ', by Bellini, and a 'Madonna', after Annibale Carracci (both at Dresden). She lithographed Albrecht Dürer's "Verehrung der heiligen Dreieinigkeit" ('The Adoration of the Holy Trinity') in 15 sheets (begun 1821 in Vienna). She died in Vienna in 1855.
