= Ewa Monika Mes =

Polish politician

6th Voivode of Kuyavian-Pomeranian Voivodeship
- Incumbent
- Assumed office 14 Dec 2010
- Preceded by: Rafał Bruski

Personal details
- Party: Polish People's Party (PSL)

Ewa Monika Mes (born 6 May 1951) is a Polish politician who is currently a Voivode of Kuyavian-Pomeranian Voivodeship.

Ewa Mes worked in the Kuyavian-Pomeranian Marshal Office (Polish: Kujawsko-Pomorski Urząd Marszałkowski, UM) in the Department of Agriculture and later as a Director of UM delegation in Bydgoszcz.

When in the 2010 local elections, Dariusz Kurzawa (Vicevoivode) was elected to the Kuyavian-Pomeranian Regional Assembly, she was a potential candidate for new Vicevoivode. Incumbent Voivode, Rafał Bruski was elected as a President of Bydgoszcz. After that, PO-PSL government coalition decided that the voivode will be from the PSL, and representative of the PO will be vicevoivod. She was nominated as a Voivode on 14 December 2010. Mes is first woman who served this office (Marzenna Drab was acting voivode in 2006).

On 12 December 2011, she was renominated in the Second Cabinet of Donald Tusk.

== See also ==
- Kuyavian-Pomeranian Voivodeship
- Greater Poland Voivodeship
