= Krystyna Smiechowska =

Polish artist

- Born: 1935 (age 90–91); Kraków, Poland

Krystyna Smiechowska (born 1935) is a Polish painter. She is recognized for her intaglio prints and lithographs, often drawing inspiration from ancient maps, inscriptions, and Slavic manuscripts from the High Middle Ages.

Her work is included in the collections of the Musée national des beaux-arts du Québec and the Portland Museum of Art.
