= Tama University =

Japanese University

Coordinates: 35°37′50″N 139°27′51″E

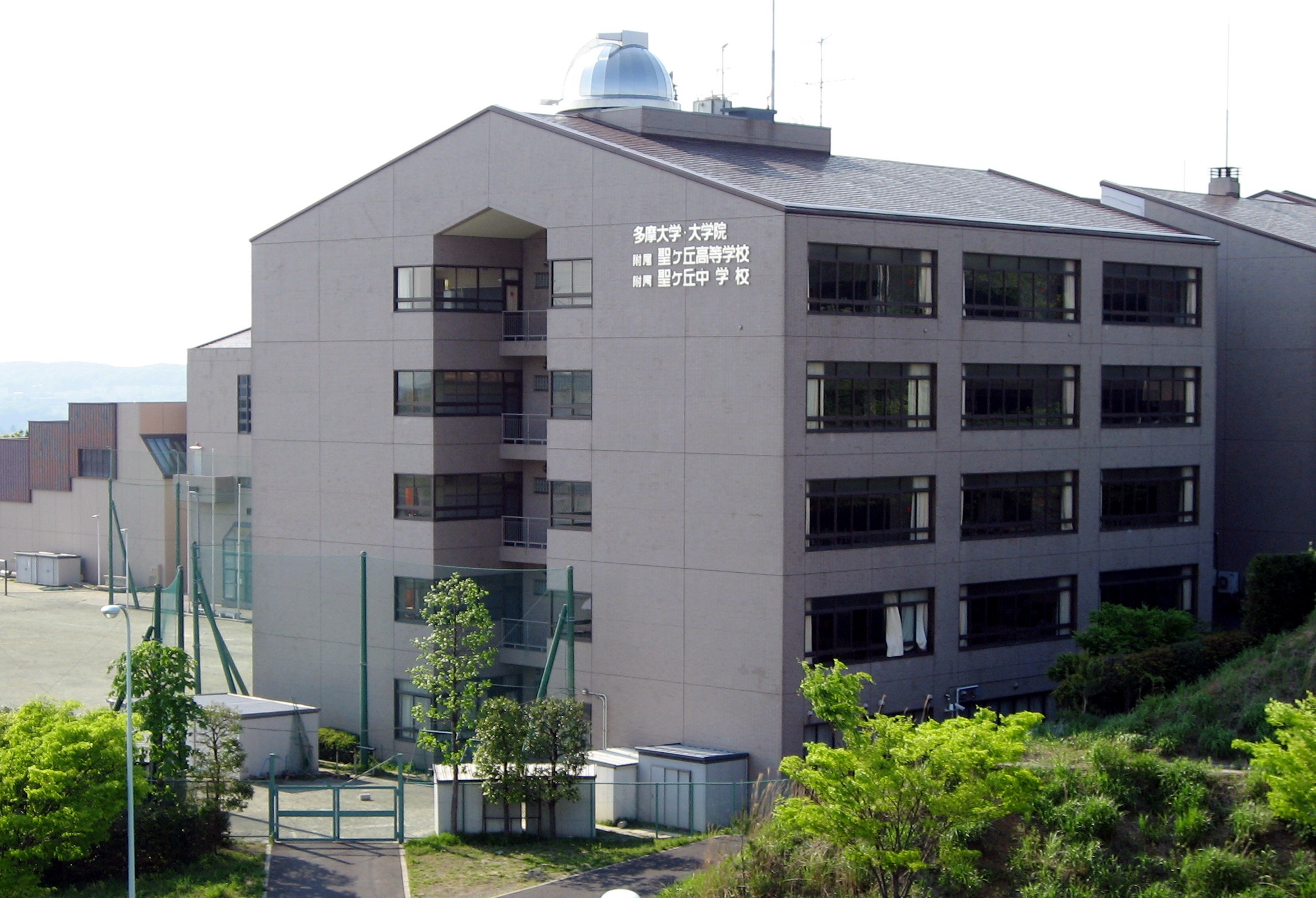
Tama University (April 2009)

Tama University (多摩大学, Tama daigaku) is a private university in Tama, Tokyo, Japan, established in 1989.
