= Wanda Zawidzka-Manteuffel =

Polish graphic artist and author

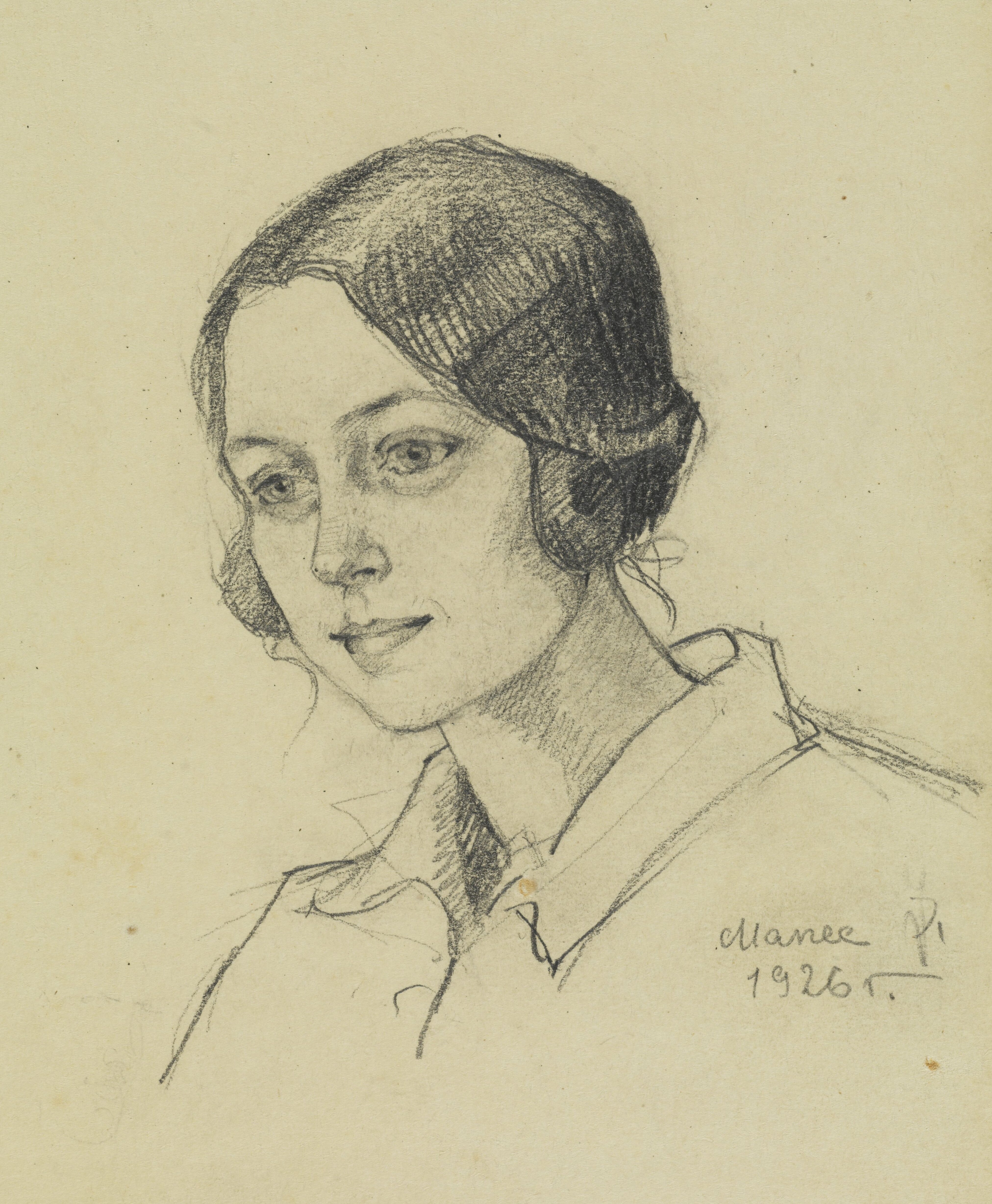
Wanda Zawidzka-Manteuffel

Wanda Zawidzka-Manteuffel (February 7, 1906 in Warsaw – May 4, 1994 in Warsaw) was a Polish graphic artist, author of book illustrations, posters, projects of glass, ceramics, and textures. She was member of the Koło Artystów Grafików Reklamowych.
