= Ewa Misiak =

Polish economist

Ewa Maria Misiak (born 1984) is a Polish economist, president of the National Employment Center, chairwoman of the Supervisory Board of Work Service International, earlier the president of this Company. Since 2012, she has been the Chairwoman of the Managements Boards of the People Care and from June 2016 PTWP S.A. companies; pro-family policy expert in the team of the president of Poland, Bronisław Komorowski.

== Biography ==
=== Education ===
A graduate of the IESE Business School in Barcelona, where she obtained the Advanced Management Program diploma in 2013. Earlier, she completed the Management Program, organized by Harvard Business Review and the Canadian Management Institute. In 2016 she graduated GLOBAL CEO program organized by IESE, CEBIS, WHARTON Business Schools. She is also a graduate of the Wrocław University of Economics.

=== Career ===
Since 2014, she has been the Chairwoman of the Management Board of the National Employment Center, a highly specialized employment agency implementing programs for the vocational activation of the long-term unemployed in the public-private partnership. The mission of the company is to use the wasted potential by bringing people distanced from the job market back to employment and adapting their skills to the employers' needs.

In December 2013, she took up the duties of the chairwoman of the Supervisory Board of Work Service International. The company is part of the Capital Group Work Service, the biggest employment agency in Poland and Central-Eastern Europe.

In 2011-2013, she managed Work Service International as its president; starting from 2008, she was a vice-president of this Company. Her management of the company, as well as acquisition actions implemented by her, ensured the presence of WSI in eight European countries and the leadership in the field of the cross-border employment in Poland and Central-Eastern Europe.

Ewa Misiak participated in the IPO process of the company Work Service SA and contributed to its introduction to the Warsaw Stock Exchange in 2012.

Since 2012, she has also been the Chairwoman of the Management Board of People Care - this company, operating under the Baby&Care brand, is currently the biggest national firm offering medical and care services for children of all ages, pregnant women and seniors.

=== Social activity/public functions ===
Ewa Misiak promotes the legal employment of nannies in Poland and the idea of Work Life Balance. She is the author of several innovative projects for families and working parents, e.g. "Legal Nanny - Safe Child" and "Family Care - an innovative program for companies helping to combine family and professional life of the companies' employees"

She is a pro-family and social policy expert of the Polish President of Employers, Andrzej Malinowski.

Since April 2013, she also has been carrying out the functions of the vice-president of the Foundation Work Service that supports people who are excluded from the job market.

=== Serving at President Bronisław Komorowski’s team ===
In 2013 she was selected for an expert commission consisting of 15 people that dealt with the issues of pro-family policy under the auspices of President Bronisław Komorowski. The decrease in the number of births noted for several years in demographics of Poland are the reason why the pro-family policy is one of the priority issues in Polish social policy. The appointment of a commission of experts led by Minister Irena Wóycicka, was supposed to help create solutions that favour the family and parental work. With the help of the commission having Ewa Misiak as a member several projects were launched whose aim was to support families and making it easier for them to coordinate personal and professional life, such as Big Family Card (in cooperation with the Ministry of Labour and Social Policy), where families having at least three children are covered by a system of discounts and additional rights; a contest for a „Family-friendly employer”, whose aim is to popularise best practices in the area of family-friendly employment; the proposal of a reform of the tax system; or the project of a family statute introducing changes concerning the simplification and flexibility of the system of childcare-related leaves and making it easier to use flexible working time.

=== Awards and distinctions ===
- In March 2015, she received the title of "Influential Women of 2015" in a plebiscite of Gazeta Wrocławska

- For her achievements, in April 2014, she received one of three main awards in the plebiscite "She is a Treasure", organized by the website OnaOnaOna.com - Beautiful Sites of Women and the monthly magazine SKARB ("Treasure").

- In March 2014, she received the honorable title of the Businesswoman of the Year in the category "Responsible Leader", according to the magazine Businesswoman&Life.

- In February 2014, she received the title of the Businesswoman of the Year 2013 in the category "Corporation", in the competition "A Success Written in Lipstick - The Businesswoman of the Year".

- In a plebiscite for entrepreneurial women "Women's Faces", the final of which took place in January 2014, she was awarded the second prize in the category "Woman Manager of the Year".

- In December 2013, she was awarded by Puls Biznesu and was included in the ranking "100 Business Women of 2013", where she was placed third in an Internet vote.

- In November 2012 she was included in the list of 30 emerging business stars of the daily newspaper Gazeta Prawna.
