= Peter Atteslander =

Swiss sociologist (1926–2016)

Peter Atteslander (17 March 1926 – 15 January 2016) was a Swiss sociologist. His research fields are industrial sociology, urban sociology, medical sociology and research methods. A recognized expert on the interaction between health and society, he has also worked as a consultant of the tobacco industry.

Atteslander was born in Ennenda. He earned the doctorate in 1952 at the University of Zurich. Until 1954, he was a visiting fellow at the New York State School of Industrial and Labor Relations. In 1960, he earned the Habilitation in Bern, and served as professeur régulier at the Centre d’Études Industrielles at the University of Geneva from 1963 to 1965. He was Professor in Bern from 1964 to 1972, and at the University of Augsburg from 1972 until 1991, when he became Professor Emeritus.

== Selected works ==
- Methoden der empirischen Sozialforschung, 12. Aufl., Erich Schmidt, Berlin 2008
- Anatomie der Ratlosigkeit, NZZ, Zürich 2007
- Die Tabakfrage aus der Sicht eines empirischen Sozialforschers, in: Tabakfragen. Rauchen aus kulturwissenschaftlicher Sicht, Zürich 1996
- Die Bedeutung sozialer Daten für die Gesundheitssystemforschung der Zukunft, in: Erwartungen an die Gesundheitssystemforschung zum Jahr 2000. Festschrift zum 75. Geburtstag von Professor Dr. med. Fritz Beske, Kiel 1997, S. 125-128
- Epidemiologie als Demoskopie: Die Verwendungen von Fragebögen in epidemiologischen Studien, in: Gesundheit, Medizin und Gesellschaft. Beiträge zur Soziologie der Gesundheit, Zürich 1999, S. 361-383
- Methodische Herausforderungen der Sozial-Epidemiologie aus Sicht der empirischen Sozialforschung, in: Sozial-Epidemiologie. Eine Einführung in die Grundlagen, Ergebnisse und Umsetzungsmöglichkeiten, Juventa/Weinheim/München 2001, S. 264-276
- Soziale Konflikte in der Gesellschaft von heute und morgen, in: Therapeutische Umschau, Bern/Stuttgart/Wien, 1971, S. 353 ff.
- Moderne Medizin zwischen individueller Erwartung und gesellschaftlichem Anspruch, in: Psychosomatische Medizin, H. 1, Bd. 15, Basel 1987, S. 27 ff.
- Grenzen medizinischer Statistik - Streit ums Passivrauchen, in: Vorwärts, Nr. 49, 3. Dezember 1988
- Gefragt ist die soziale Kompetenz des Arztes, in: Deutsches Ärzteblatt 96, Heft 23, 11. Juni 1999, S. A-1549-1550
- Abundance of Medical Information - Shortage of Medical Orientation, in: World Medical Journal Vol. 52, No. 2, June 2006, pp. 31–33
- Abundance of Medical Information - Shortage of Medical Orientation, in: JMAJ - Japan Medical Association Journal, Vol. 50, No. 4, July–August 2007
