= Idalia Zagroba =

Polish printmaker (born 1967)

Idalia Zagroba (born 1967) is a Polish printmaker.

Zagroba graduated from the Academy of Fine Arts, Krakow, in 1995. An untitled woodcut of 1995 is owned by the National Gallery of Art.
