= Ewa Zawadzka =

Polish graphic artist (born 1950)

Ewa Zawadzka (born 1950) is a Polish graphic artist.

Born near Łódź, Zawadzka received her diploma from the Jan Matejko Academy of Fine Arts in 1976. She continued her studies under Andrzej Pietsch before taking a teaching position in Częstochowa. Beginning in 1995 she taught at the European Academy of Arts in Warsaw. A collagraph by Zawadzka is owned by the National Gallery of Art.
