= Zofia Atteslander =

Polish artist (1874–c. 1928)

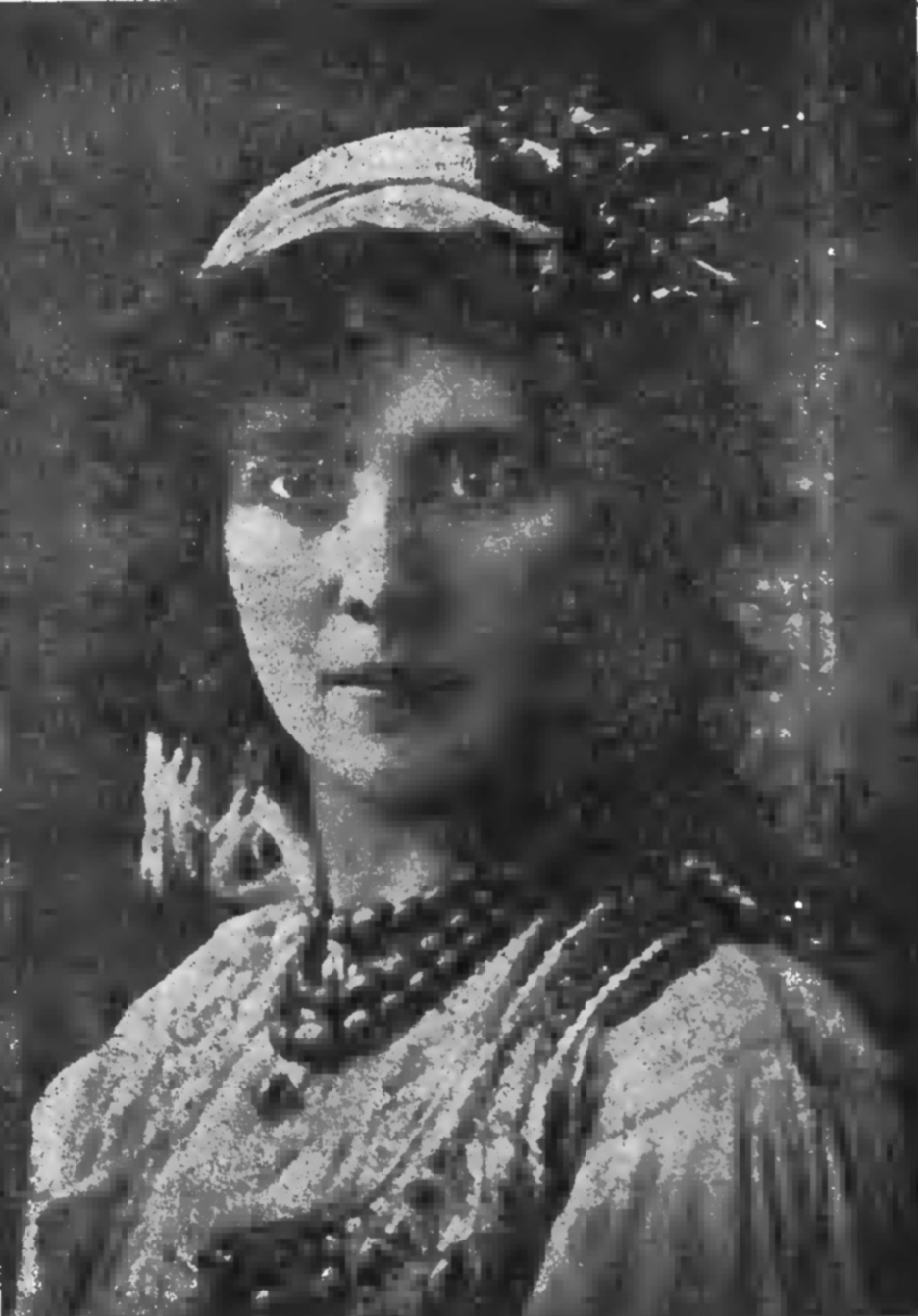
- Zofia Atteslander
- Born: Zofia Atteslander; 12 March 1874; Luborzyca, Poland
- Died: c. 1928; Berlin, Germany
- Education: Privately with Jacek Malczewski in Kraków
- Known for: Painting

Zofia Atteslander (12 March 1874 – c. 1928) was a Polish painter, active from 1889 until 1928 in inter alia Berlin, Paris and Wiesbaden.

== Biography ==
She was born in Luborzyca. Her artistic training began privately with Jacek Malczewski in Kraków, later with Franz von Lenbach, Heinrich Knirr (1862–1944), with Stanisław Grocholski in Munich, and after 1902 with Adolf Hölzel in Dachau. She specialised in portrait painting and still life.

During her stay in Wiesbaden in 1904 she painted portraits for the Romanian Royal Family. During her stay in Paris in 1908 she received an honour at the Saloon of French Artists. In 1904, she took part in Warsaw's Society of the Incentive for Fine Arts (Towarzystwo Zachęty Sztuk Pięknych), as well as in 1903, in Kraków's Society of the Friends of Fine Arts (Towarzystwo Przyjaciół Sztuk Pięknych). Apart from oil painting she also practised pastel drawing. She has often marked her paintings with "Zo". The last documented information of Zofia Atteslander came from 1928.

== Works ==
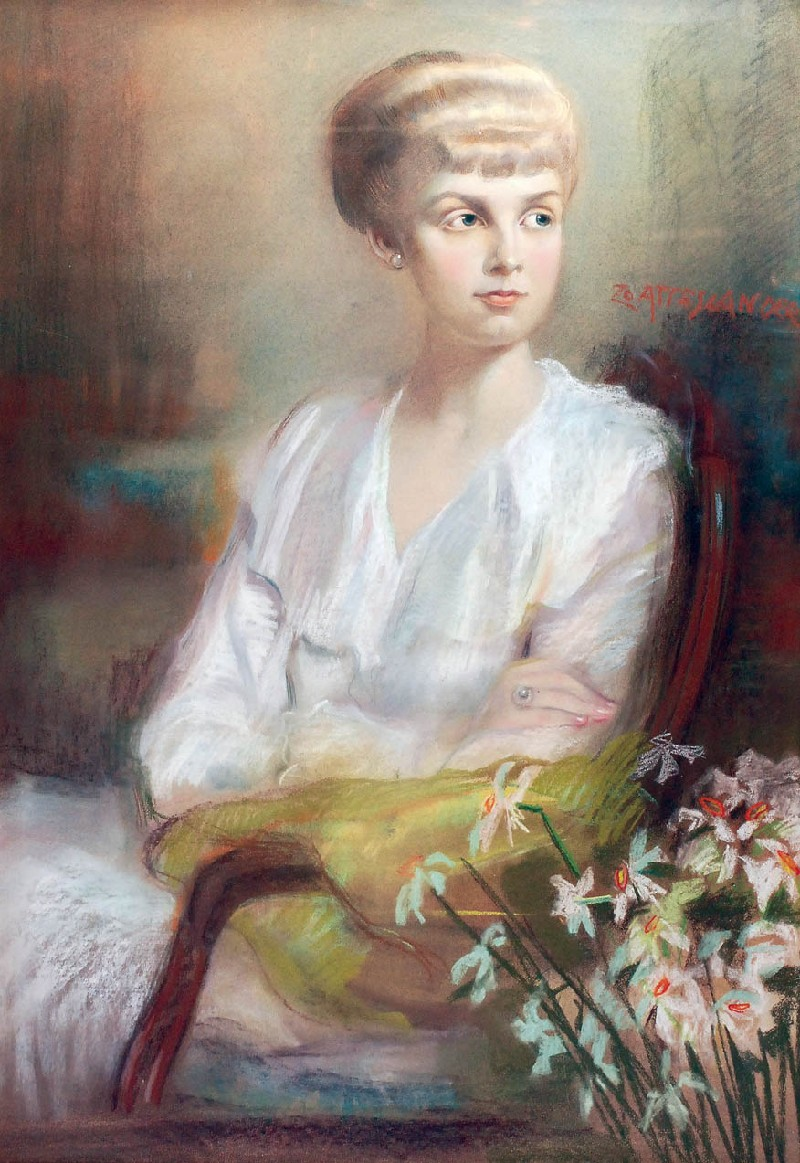
Portrait of a young woman
with narcissus

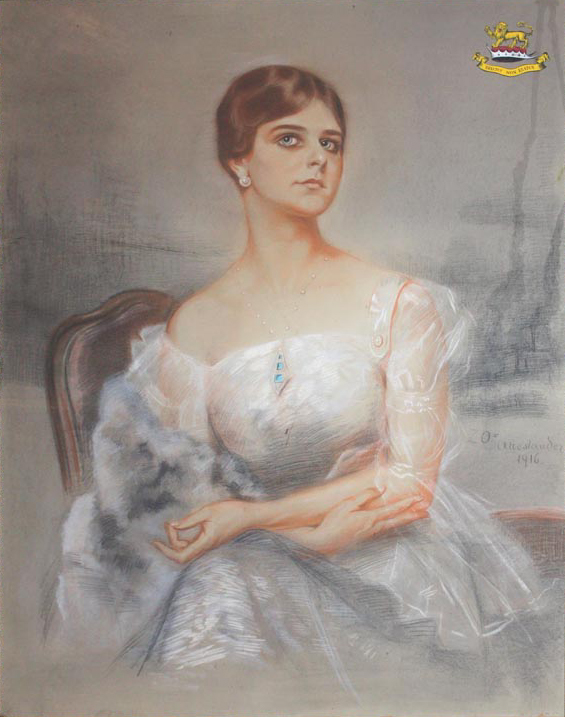
Portrait of a woman

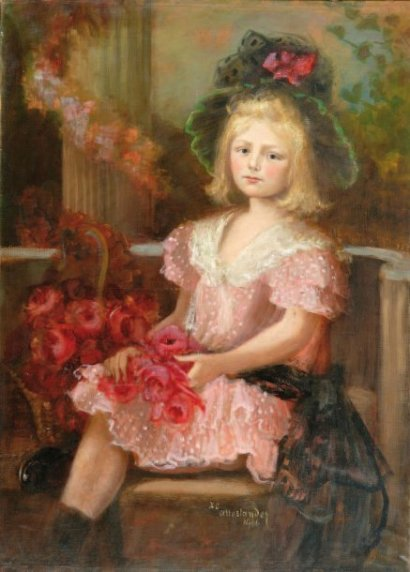
Girl with a green hat

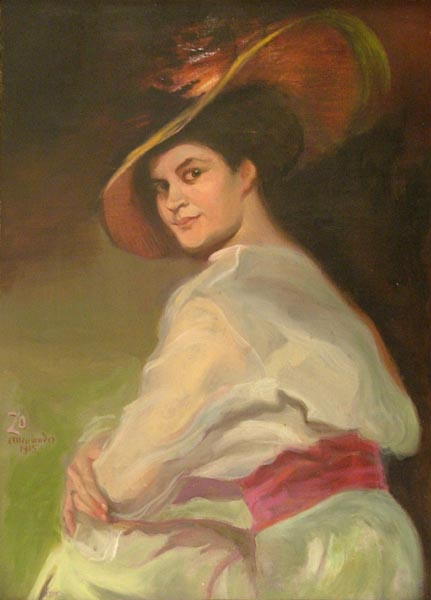
Portrait of a girl with a hat

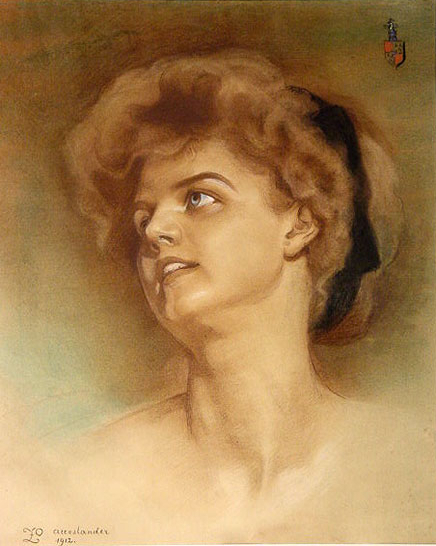
Portrait of Lady Stanhope (1912)
