= Ewa Pachucka =

Polish-Australian sculptor (1936–2020)

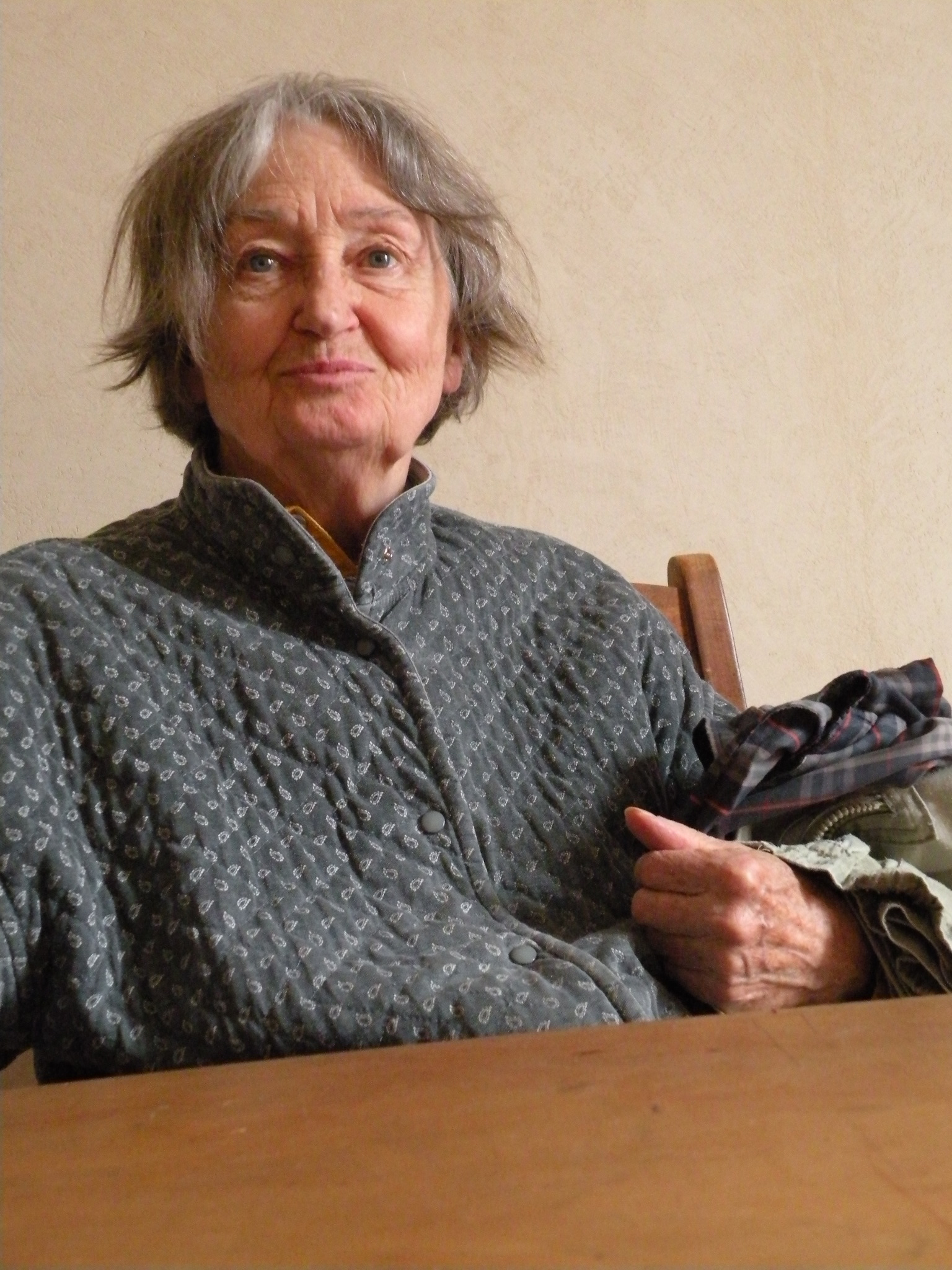
- Ewa Pachucka, 2016
- Born: Ewa Teresa Jaroszyńska; 17 February 1936; Lublin, Poland
- Died: 28 July 2020 (aged 84); Castres, France
- Occupation: Sculptor
- Known for: Crochet art
- Notable work: Landscape and Bodies, 77
- Parent(s): Stanisław Jaroszyński and Lidia Marynowska

Ewa Pachucka (nee Jaroszyńska) (17 February 1936 – 28 July 2020) was a Polish-Australian sculptor.

== Biography ==
Pachucka was born in Lublin, Poland on 17 February 1936. She studied visual art in Warsaw at the Lyceum of Plastic arts from 1952 to 1954, then at the Lyceum of Plastic Arts in Lublin (1954–1957), and then studied at the Academy of Fine arts in Łódź from 1957 to 1958, which is known as the historic site of Poland's textile industry.

While studying as an art student, Pachucka was inspired by the abstraction movement, defying traditional Polish Socrealizm (Socialist Realism) art, which was the dominant style at the time in post-World War II Poland.

Pachucka was influenced by renowned Polish experimental textile artist and weaver Jolanta Owidzka, and began to move from painting and printmaking into sculptural and textile works. Pachucka began to experiment with crocheting on a large scale, creating three-dimensional works with string made from hemp and jute rope that she sourced from a local fishermen's shop.

Pachucka married Romek Pachucki in 1969, moving and emigrating with him first to Denmark, and after to Australia in 1970, first living in Sydney, before moving to Hobart in 1976.

Pachucka's arrival to Australia coincided with the revival of fibre arts movement of the 1970s, and her large sculptural weaving work in natural fibers such as hemp, coir and sisal, gained Pachucka major recognition in Australia, Europe and the United States.

Pachucka's first show in Australia was held in 1972, at the Rudy Komon Gallery in Sydney, where she sold nearly the entire collection of crocheted figures on display.

On her own method Pachucka said, "I build forms laboriously with a crochet hook... in this world of ours where 'instant' is 'promoted', art being no exception, I find satisfaction in this technically unaided function".

Pachucka was the only female artist represented in the 1973 exhibition Recent Australian Art at the Art Gallery of New South Wales, with her work Landscape and Bodies (1972), which was purchased by the National Gallery of Australia and displayed in their 2009 exhibition Soft Sculpture.

One of Pachucka's major works is the multi-part installation titled Arcadia: Landscape and Bodies (1972–1977), which was created over a four-year period, first being displayed at the Rudy Komon Gallery in Sydney in November 1977, then later being acquired and exhibited at the Art Gallery of New South Wales in 1978. The work has been described as "a remarkable tour de force," by Australian art critic Elwyn Lynn. In 2018, Arcadia: Landscape and Bodies (1972–1977) was put back on display in the titular exhibition Ewa Pachucka "Arcadia: Landscape and Bodies", held at the Art Gallery of New South Wales.

In 2010 Pachucka exhibited in the 3rd International Art Festival in Krakow, where she received a prize for "the artist recognized for her long term creative achievements, comprehensive activity in contemporary unique textiles and uncompromising daring in the creation of new phenomena and values in art so that her attitude and talent have stimulated invention among young generations of artists".

Pachucka returned to live in Europe in 2000, dying in France on 28 July 2020 in Castres.

Pachucka was featured in the Know My Name exhibition at the National Gallery of Australia in 2020–2021.

== Public art commissions ==
Pachucka completed a couple of public art commissions in Australia during the 1980s, including a large sculpture Roman Wall, a large sculpture for the Australian Archives building in Hobart, 1982, and which is now located at the University of Tasmania, Hobart.

In 1988 Pachucka was commissioned to create the large (12.5 meters long) sandstone installation, The Sun Calendar or Fossilized Architectural Landscape for the courtyard of the House of Representatives at the Parliament House of Australia, Canberra.

== Exhibitions ==
- 1958 "Prints" Writers Park, Warsaw.
- 1968 Warsaw Festival of Arts Tapestry Exhibition, Warsaw.
- 1969 "Wall Hangings", Museum of Modern Art, New York.
- 1969 Norrkoping Museum, Norrkoping, Sweden.
- 1970 Crocheted forms, Grabowski Gallery, London.
- 1970 National Museum, Stockholm.
- 1970 Crocheted forms, Ved Aen Gallery, Arhus, Denmark.
- 1972 Ewa Pachucka, Landscape & bodies ’72, 9 September to 7 October 1972. Rudy Komon Gallery.
- 1972 Ewa Pachucka, crochet sculptures, Tasmanian Museum and Art Gallery, Hobart, TAS.
- 1973 Sculpturescape, Mildura Sculpture Trienniale, Mildura. April–July, 1973.
- 1973 Imprints in Paint, Rudy Komon Gallery, Sydney.
- 1973 Recent Australian Art, crocheted forms, Art Gallery of New South Wales, Sydney, October–November 1973.
- 1973 Contemporary Australian Painting and Sculpture, New Zealand tour, 1973.
- 1973 Cartlon Festival, Australian Council for the Arts and Victorian Ministry for the Arts, Victoria.
- 1973 Sculpture by Ewa Pachucka. Queen Victoria Museum and Art Gallery, Launceston, TAS.
- 1974 Represented Australia in Triennale of Contemporary Art, New Delhi, India.
- 1974 World Crafts Council conference in Toronto, Canada.
- 1976 Twentieth Tasmanian Art Gallery Exhibition – Sculpture, June 1976.
- 1977 One person show, Landscape and Bodies 77, Arcadia, November – December 1977.
- 1977 Project 20: Fabric Art. Art Gallery of New South Wales, Sydney, NSW, 3 September 1977 – 9 October 1977.
- 1978 Collection Pieces, National Gallery of Victoria, 1978.
- 1978 Survey 5: Ewa Pachucka. National Gallery of Victoria, Melbourne, VIC.
- 1980 20 Years Jubilee Exhibition, Rudy Komon Art Gallery, Sydney, 8 December 1979.
- 1981 The Art Fabric, Mainstream. Museum of Modern Art, NY, USA.
- 1981–1983 American Federation of Arts Touring America.
- 1984 Fantastic Fabrics, Lake Macquarie Gallery.
- 1990 A Free Hand. Powerhouse Museum, New South Wales.
- 1995 National Women's Art Exhibition. Art Gallery of New South Wales, Sydney, NSW, 8 March 1995 – 8 June 1995.
- 1995 Colonial Pastime to Contemporary Profession: 150 years of Australian Women's Art. Tasmanian Museum and Art Gallery, Hobart, Tas. 8 March 1995 – July 1995.
- 2009 Soft Sculpture. National Gallery of Australia. 24 April – 12 July 2009.
- 2010 3rd International Art Festival, Krakow, Poland.
- 2018 Ewa Pachucka Arcadia: landscape and bodies. Art Gallery of New South Wales, 3 March – 29 April 2018.
- 2020–2021 Know My Name: Australian Women Artists 1900 to now, National Gallery of Australia.

== Collections ==
- National Gallery of Australia, Canberra.
- Art Gallery of New South Wales, Sydney.
- National Museum, Stockholm.
- Lars Wetterling Collection, Sweden.
- Grabowski Gallery, London.
- Omme Gallery, Silkeborg, Denmark.
- The Parliament House Art Collection, Canberra.
- Ararat Art Gallery.
- National Gallery of Victoria

Melbourne, Victoria, Australia - "Conversation" 1974.

- Tasmanian Museum and Art Gallery - Hobart, Tasmania, Australia - "Woman with hybride",1980, imprints in paint "Conversation" 1973.

== Publications ==
- Craft Horizon 68, Fred Swartz, U.S.A.
- Storstaden 21/70, Gunnar Hellman, Sweden.
- Art And Artists 70, M.G., London.
- Projekt 70, Wroblewska, Poland.
- Design 71, Martin Hardingham, London.
- Tasmanian artists of the twentieth century: painters, sculptors, printmakers and photographers 1900–1985 / Sue Backhouse.
- Know My Name. Canberra, ACT : National Gallery of Australia, 2020.
