= List of Polish painters =

This is an alphabetical listing of Polish painters. This list is incomplete. If a notable Polish painter is missing and without article, please add the name here'.

== A ==
- Bronislaw Abramowicz (1837–1912)
- Piotr Abraszewski (1905–1996)
- Julia Acker (1898–1942)
- Tadeusz Ajdukiewicz (1852–1916)
- Zygmunt Ajdukiewicz (1861–1917)
- Hiacynt Alchimowicz (1841–after 1897)
- Kazimierz Alchimowicz (1840–1916)
- Zygmunt Andrychiewicz (1861–1943)
- Włodzimierz Antkowiak (born 1946)
- Zofia Atteslander (1874–c. 1928)
- Aleksander Augustynowicz (1865–1944)
- Teodor Axentowicz (1859–1938)

== B ==
- Władysław Bakałowicz (1831–1904)
- Stefan Bakałowicz (1857–1947)
- Henoch Barczyński (1896–1941)
- Andrzej Marian Bartczak (born 1945)
- Zdzisław Beksiński (1929–2005)
- Ludomir Benedyktowicz (1844–1926)
- Stanisław Bergman (1862–1930)
- Jan Betley (1908–1980)
- Dora Bianka (c. 1895–1979), painter, illustrator
- Anna Bilińska (1857–1893)
- Antoni Blank (1785–1844)
- Jan Bohuszewicz (1878–1935)
- Krzysztof Boguszewski (died 1635)
- Stanisław Bohusz-Siestrzeńcewicz (1869–1927)
- Olga Boznańska (1865–1940)
- Józef Brandt (1841–1915)
- Chrystian Breslauer (1802–1882)
- Antoni Brodowski (1784–1832)
- Józef Brodowski the Elder (c. 1775/81–1853)
- Józef Brodowski the Younger (1828–1900)
- Tadeusz Brodowski (1821–1848)
- Feliks Brzozowski (1836–1892)
- Tadeusz Brzozowski (1918–1987)
- Teodor Buchholz (1857–1942)
- Maxim Bugzester (1909–1978)

== C ==
- Józef Cempla (1918–2004)
- Maximilian Cercha (1818–1907)
- Józef Chełmoński (1849–1905)
- Stanisław Chlebowski (1835–1884)
- Daniel Chodowiecki (1726–1801)
- Leon Chwistek (1884–1944)
- Jan Ciągliński (1858–1913)
- Ewa Ciepielewska (born 1960)
- Henryk Cieszkowski (1835–1895)
- Florian Cynk (1838–1912)
- Władysław Czachorski (1850–1911)
- Józef Czajkowski (1872–1947)
- Marian Czapla (1946–2016)
- Szymon Czechowicz (1689–1775)
- Tytus Czyżewski (1880–1945)

== Ć ==
- Zefiryn Ćwikliński (1871–1930)

== D ==
- Odo Dobrowolski (1883–1917)
- Tomasz Dolabella (1570–1650)
- Kasia Domanska (born 1972)
- Tadeusz Dominik (1928–2014)
- Tadeusz Dowgird (1852–1919)

== E ==
- Erwin Elster (1887–1977)
- Stasys Eidrigevicius (born 1949)

== F ==
- Erazm Fabijański (1826–1892)
- Julian Fałat (1853–1929)
- Wojciech Fangor (1922–2015)
- Stefan Filipkiewicz (1879–1944)
- Stanisław Frenkiel (1918–2001)
- Tadeusz Fuss-Kaden (1914–1985)

== G ==
- Ewa Gargulinska (born 1941)
- Maria Gażycz (1860–1935)
- Ignacy Gepner (1802–1867)
- Wojciech Gerson (1831–1901)
- Adam Gerżabek (1898–1965)
- Stefan Gierowski (1925–2022)
- Aleksander Gierymski (1850–1901)
- Maksymilian Gierymski (1846–1874)
- Adrian Głębocki (1833–1905)
- Krzysztof Gliszczyński (born 1962)
- Izabella Godlewska (1931–2018)
- Chaim Goldberg (1917–2004)
- Tadeusz Gorecki (1825–1868)
- Michał Gorstkin-Wywiórski (1861–1926)
- Henryk Gotlib (1890–1966)
- Maurycy Gottlieb (1856–1879)
- Stanisław Grocholski (1865–1932)
- Artur Grottger (1837–1867)
- Aleksander Gryglewski (1833–1879)
- Gustaw Gwozdecki (1880–1935)

== H ==
- Alice Halicka (1895–1975)
- Karol Hiller (1891–1939)

== I ==
- Napoleon Iłłakowicz (1811–1861)
- Marian Iwańciów (1906–1971)

== J ==
- Izydor Jabłoński (1865–1905)
- Janusz Janowski (born 1965)
- Maria Jarema (1908–1958)
- Zdzisław Jasiński (1863–1932)
- Renata Jaworska (born 1979)
- Danuta Joppek (born 1955)
- Krzysztof Jung (1951–1998)
- Ewa Juszkiewicz (born 1984)

== K ==
- Jan Kaja (born 1957)
- Stanisław Kamocki (1875–1944)
- Rajmund Kanelba (1897–1960)
- Tadeusz Kantor (1915–1990)
- Stanisława de Karłowska (1876–1952)
- Alfons Karpiński (1875–1961)
- Katarzyna Karpowicz (born 1985)
- Wincenty Kasprzycki (1802–1849)
- Apoloniusz Kędzierski (1861–1939)
- Mojżesz Kisling (1891–1953)
- Marcin Kitz (1891–1943)
- Stefan Knapp (1921–1996)
- Marcin Kober (c. 1550–c. 1598)
- Roman Kochanowski (1857–1945)
- Aleksander Kokular (1793–1846)
- Ludwik Konarzewski (1885–1954)
- Ludwik Konarzewski (junior) (1918–1989)
- Bogdan Korczowski (born 1954)
- Jerzy Kossak (1886–1955)
- Juliusz Kossak (1824–1899)
- Wojciech Kossak (1856–1942)
- Franciszek Kostrzewski (1826–1911)
- Mieczysław Kościelniak (1912–1993)
- Wilhelm Kotarbiński (1848–1921)
- Apolinary Kotowicz (1859–1917)
- Aleksander Kotsis (1836–1877)
- Alfred Kowalski (1849–1915)
- Andrzej Kowalski (1930–2004)
- Felicjan Kowarski (1890–1948)
- Antoni Kozakiewicz (1841–1929)
- Andrzej Krajewski (1933–2018)
- Nikifor Krynicki (1895–1968)
- Hilary Krzysztofiak (1926–1979)
- Konrad Krzyżanowski (1872–1922)
- Wlodzimierz Ksiazek (1951–2011)
- Stanisław Kubicki (1889–1943)
- Alexander Kucharsky (1741–1819)
- Jarosław Kukowski (born 1972)
- Zbigniew Kupczynski (1928–2024)
- Teofil Kwiatkowski (1809–1891)

== L ==
- Tamara de Lempicka (1898–1980)
- Stanisław Lentz (1861–1920)
- Aleksander Lesser (1814–1884)
- Wincenty de Lesseur (1745–1813)
- Mariusz Lewandowski (1960-2022)
- Olga Lewicka (born 1975)
- Benon Liberski (1926–1983)

== Ł ==
- Łukasz Leja
- Bronisława Łukaszewicz (1885–1962)
- Władysław Łuszczkiewicz (1828–1900)

== M ==
- Jerzy Makarewicz (1907–1944)
- Tadeusz Makowski (1882–1932)
- Jacek Malczewski (1854–1929)
- Władysław Malecki (1836–1900)
- Geno Malkowski (1942–2016)
- Adam Marczyński (1908–1985)
- Artur Markowicz (1872–1934)
- Ludwik Marteau (c.1715–1804)
- Stanisław Masłowski (1853–1926)
- Jan Matejko (1838–1893)
- Józef Męcina-Krzesz (1860–1934)
- Józef Mehoffer (1869–1946)
- Paweł Merwart (1855–1902)
- Piotr Michałowski (1800–1855)
- Jacek Mierzejewski (1883–1925)
- Jerzy Mierzejewski (1917–2012)
- Maurycy Minkowski (1881–1930)
- Augustyn Mirys (1700–1790)
- Ludwik Misky (1884–1938)
- Eugeniusz Molski (born 1942)
- Tadeusz Myslowski (born 1943)

== N ==
- Abraham Neumann (1873–1942)
- Leopold Niemirowski (1810–1883)
- Eligiusz Niewiadomski (1869–1923)
- Jan Piotr Norblin (1745–1830)
- Zbigniew Nowosadzki (born 1957)
- Jerzy Nowosielski (1923–2011)
- Leszek Nowosielski (1918–2000)

== O ==
- Seweryn Obst (1847–1917)
- Józef Oleszkiewicz (c. 1777–1830)
- Roman Opałka (1931–2011)
- Aleksander Orłowski (1777–1832)

== P ==
- Aniela Pająkówna (1864–1912)
- Józef Pankiewicz (1866–1940)
- Aniela Pawlikowska (1901–1980)
- Józef Peszka (1767–1831)
- Franciszek Pfanhauser (1796–1865)
- Henryk Pillati (1832–1894)
- Józef Pitschmann (1758–1834)
- Kazimierz Pochwalski (1855–1940)
- Władysław Pochwalski (1860–1924)
- Władysław Podkowiński (1866–1895)
- Tadeusz Popiel (1863–1913)
- Peter Potworowski (1898–1962)
- Thomas Pradzynski (1951–2007)
- Tadeusz Pruszkowski (1888–1942)
- Witold Pruszkowski (1846–1896)
- Stanislaw Przespolewski (1910–1989)

== R ==
- Józef Rapacki (1871–1929)
- Jan Rembowski (1879–1923)
- Henryk Rodakowski (1823–1894)
- Jan Rosen (1854–1936)
- Barbara Rosiak (born 1955)
- Marcin Rożek (1885–1944)
- Jan Rubczak (1882–1942)
- Hanna Rudzka-Cybisowa (1897–1988)
- Kanuty Rusiecki (1800–1860)
- Ferdynand Ruszczyc (1870–1936)

== S ==
- Wojciech Sadley (1932–2023)
- Stanisław Samostrzelnik (c. 1490–1541)
- Wilhelm Sasnal (born 1972)
- Bruno Schulz (1892–1942)
- Kazimierz Sichulski (1879–1942)
- Jerzy Siemiginowski-Eleuter (c. 1660–c. 1711)
- Henryk Siemiradzki (1843–1902)
- Józef Simmler (1823–1868)
- Wojciech Siudmak (born 1942)
- Wincenty Sleńdziński (1838–1909)
- Mirosław Śledź (born 1961)
- Władysław Ślewiński (1856–1918)
- Wincenty Smokowski (1797–1876)
- Franciszek Smuglewicz (1745–1807)
- Jacek Soliński (born 1957)
- Kajetan Sosnowski (1913–1987)
- Jan Stanisławski (1860–1907)
- Franciszek Starowieyski (1930–2009)
- Kazimierz Stabrowski (1869–1929)
- Piotr Stachiewicz (1858–1938)
- Michał Stachowicz (1768–1825)
- Ludwik Stasiak (1858–1924)
- Henryk Stażewski (1894–1988)
- Andrzej Stech (1635–1697)
- Kajetan Stefanowicz (1886–1920)
- Zofia Stryjeńska (1891–1976)
- Władysław Strzemiński (1893–1952)
- Jan Styka (1858–1925)
- January Suchodolski (1797–1875)
- Rachela Suckewer (1904/1905–1943)
- Józef Szermentowski (1833–1876)
- Stanislav Szukalski (1893–1987)
- Boguslaw Szwacz (1912–2009)
- Włodzimierz Szymanowicz (1946–1967)
- Zofia Szymanowska-Lenartowicz (1825–1870)
- Pantaleon Szyndler (1846–1905)

== T ==
- Waleria Tarnowska (1782-1849)
- Franciszek Tepa (1829–1889)
- Włodzimierz Tetmajer (1861–1923)
- Stanisław Tondos (1854–1917)
- Wincenty Trojanowski (1859–1928)

== U ==
- Aleksandra Urban (born 1978)

== V ==
- Zygmunt Vogel (1764–1826)

== W ==
- Zygmunt Waliszewski (1897–1936)
- Władysław Wankie (1860–1925)
- Walenty Wańkowicz (1799–1842)
- Ryszard Wasko (born 1947)
- Wacław Wąsowicz (1891–1942)
- Wojciech Weiss (1875–1950)
- Henryk Weyssenhoff (1859–1922)
- Katerina Wilczynski (1894–1978)
- Mikołaj Wisznicki (1870–1954)
- Stanisław Witkiewicz (1851–1915)
- Stanisław Ignacy Witkiewicz (1885–1939)
- Karol D. Witkowski (1860–1910)
- Wincenty Wodzinowski (1866–1940)
- Kazimierz Wojniakowski (1771–1812)
- Witold Wojtkiewicz (1879–1909)
- Ryszard Woźniak (born 1956)
- Andrzej Wróblewski (1927–1957)
- Leon Wyczółkowski (1852–1936)
- Stanisław Wyspiański (1869–1907)

== Y ==
- Jacek Yerka (born 1952)

== Z ==
- Eugeniusz Zak (1884–1926)
- Marcin Zaleski (1796–1877)
- Jan Zamoyski (1542–1605)
- Anna Ziaja (born 1954)

== Ż ==
- Franciszek Żmurko (1859–1910)
- Aleksander Żywiecki (born 1962)

== See also ==
- List of famous Poles
- List of painters
- List of Polish graphic designers
- List of Polish sculptors
