= Leszek Nowosielski =

Leszek Nowosielski may refer to:

- Leszek Nowosielski (footballer) (born 1992), Polish footballer
- Leszek Nowosielski (fencer) (born 1968), Canadian fencer
- Leszek Nowosielski (painter) (1918–2000), Polish painter
