= Stanisław Przespolewski =

Polish painter

Stanisław Kajetan Przespolewski
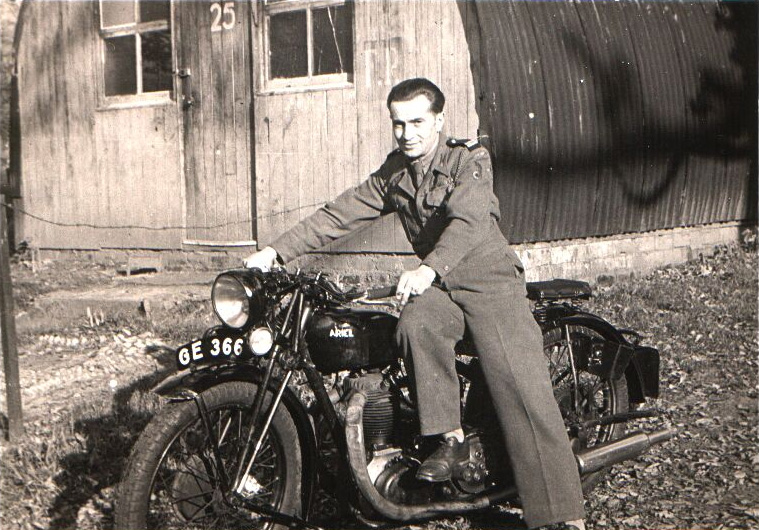
- Stanisław Przespolewski as a Polish soldier in Scotland, posing on a motorbike (that wasn't his) in front of a Nissen hut
- Born: Stanisław Kajetan Przespolewski; 8 April 1910; Warsaw, Poland
- Died: 8 June 1989 (aged 79); Breda, Netherlands
- Resting place: Begraafplaats Ledevaert, Chaam, Netherlands; 51°30′18″N 4°51′28″E
- Known for: Painting

Stanisław Kajetan Przespolewski (8 April 1910 – 8 June 1989) was a Polish painter. Originally based in Poland, he moved to Scotland during the Second World War, and later worked in England and the Netherlands. He became known for his large series of pencil portraits of Polish soldiers in the Second World War. Three of these portraits are kept at the Amsterdam Rijksmuseum.

== Biography ==
=== Education ===
Before the Second World War, Przespolewski had his art education at the Academy of Fine Arts in Kraków, where his teachers included Stefan Filipkiewicz (1931) and Władysław Jarocki (1932). He went on to study at the Kunstgewerbeschule at Vienna, the art school that rejected Adolf Hitler 20 years earlier, and also in Paris and in Poznań, Poland.

=== World War II ===
After leaving Poland in 1939 and a short period in France in 1940, Przespolewski moved to the United Kingdom, where he was stationed for some time with the Polish Armed Forces in the West in Biggar, Scotland.

In Scotland, he met Józef Sękalski and Roberta Hodges in St Andrews, Fife. At her studio in the attic of The Bell Rock House, he painted a number of portraits, nudes, still lives and landscapes. From 1944 onwards he was one of the Polish combatants in the 1st Polish Armoured Division and advanced from Normandy to Wilhelmshaven in May 1945.

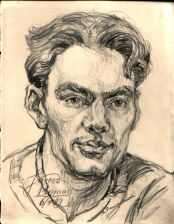

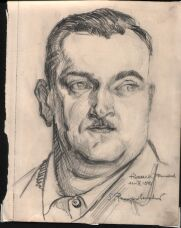

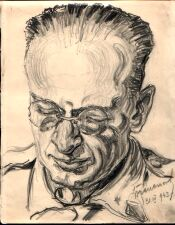

Three drawings of Polish soldiers in exile in Britain in 1943.

=== After the war ===
In 1949 he married the Belgian-Dutch artist Jeanne Prisse (1921–2008). They moved to Salford (near Manchester, England) where he had a number of odd jobs and appointments as designer for the ceramic industries. Later they moved to Ulvenhout, Netherlands. Here he had his own studio where he painted, made various designs for theatre décors and produced pottery. This was also the place where he taught art to small groups of pupils.
