= Benon (given name) =

Benon is a given name. Notable people with the given name include:

- Benon Biraaro (1958–2020), Ugandan military officer
- Benon Liberski (1926–1983), Polish painter and graphic artist
- Benon Mugumbya (born 1980), Ugandan musician and music producer
- Benon Mutambi (born 1969), Ugandan economist and civil servant
