= Ignacy Gepner =

Polish painter

- Born: Ignacy Gepner; 3 September 1802; Płock, Poland
- Died: 30 July 1867
- Education: University of Warsaw
- Known for: Painting
- Movement: Realism

Ignacy Gepner (September 3, 1802 in Płock – July 30, 1867) was a Polish painter.

Between 1824 and 1826, he studied at the University of Warsaw under the guidance of Aleksander Kokular. His artwork includes portraits as well as generic scenes from the lives of the town dwellers and workers. He also created lithography.

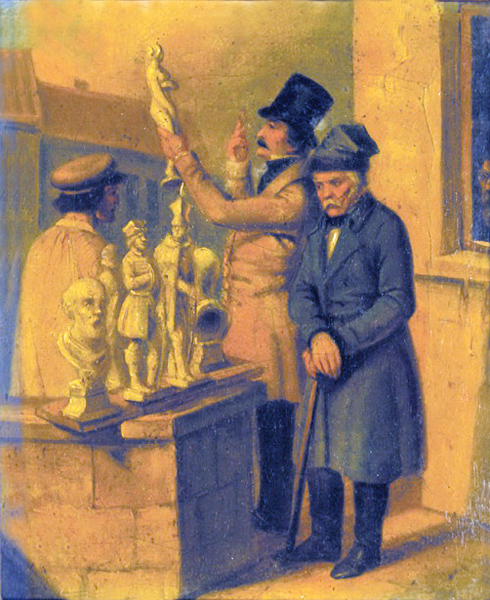
Booth with sculptures
(before 1867)
