= Felicjan Kowarski =

Polish artist

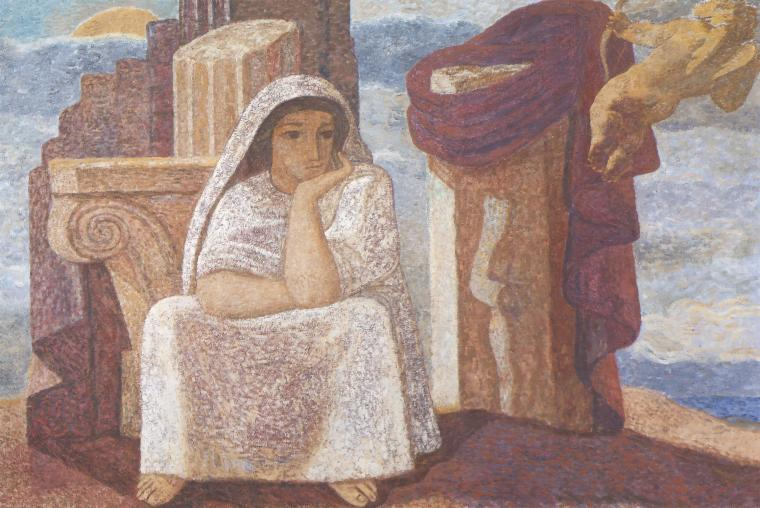
Felicjan Kowarski

Felicjan Szczęsny Kowarski (8 November 1890 – 22 September 1948) was a Polish painter and sculptor, known mostly from his monumental wall paintings and plafonds (e.g. plafond in the Hall under the Birds at castle of Wawel). His work was part of the painting event in the art competition at the 1936 Summer Olympics.

== See also ==
- Jan Betley
