= Odo Dobrowolski =

Polish painter

- Born: Odo Dobrowolski; 1883; Chernivtsi, Austria-Hungary
- Died: 1917 (aged 33–34); Kiev, Russian Empire
- Education: Jan Matejko Academy of Fine Arts, Kraków
- Known for: Painting
- Movement: Realism

Odo Dobrowolski (1883–1917) was a Polish painter.

== Life ==
He was born in Chernivtsi as the son of Józef Dobrowolski, an official of the Gubernium of Galicia, and Eugenia Wittich. Odo took his secondary education in Lviv. He studied at the Jan Matejko Academy of Fine Arts in Kraków, most likely as an independent student. During his years in Paris, between 1908 and 1909, he was guided by Jan Styka. Afterwards, he took a short stay in Munich before continuing on to Lviv. In Lviv, he created a large oil painting depicting the town square, which was put on display at Gabriela Zapolska's confectionary "Dworek" by 4 Akademicka Street. In 1911–12, he returned to live in Paris. In 1912, he took part in a presentation of drawings at the Leopolitan Literature-Art Grouping. During the Russian army's occupation of Lviv, Odo, with the affirmation of the military's local censorship council, published his ten-piece portfolio of an auto lithography of "Lwów 1914-15" ("Lviv 1914-15", costing 30 crowns), which achieved much popularity. In June 1915, he moved to Kyiv, where he died in 1917.

== Lwów 1914–1915 portfolio ==
During the Russian occupation of Lviv in the winter of 1914–1915, Dobrowolski published Lwów 1914–1915, a portfolio of ten color autolithographs of the city. According to the Polish Biographical Dictionary, the sheets are 40 cm × 30 cm (16 in × 12 in), on boards of 57 cm × 40 cm (22 in × 16 in). The same dictionary adds that the wartime censors passed the edition. The cover gives the titles of the plates in Polish and in Russian. In 1916, a bookshop in Stanisławów (now Ivano-Frankivsk) offered the portfolio for 30 crowns in its catalog.

The plates listed on the cover include a general view of the city, the Dormition Church, St. Mary's Square, the university, the Diet building, the Governorate buildings, and St. George's Cathedral. The Lviv National Art Gallery describes the plate of St. George's as an earlier work, made in summer and not part of the winter series. The cover and Treter's review, however, both count it among the portfolio's plates.

In April 1915, the art historian Mieczysław Treter reviewed the portfolio in a two-part article in the daily Kurjer Lwowski. He predicted that it would sell very quickly and that its small print run would make it a rarity prized by admirers of the city and collectors of Polish prints. He singled out the plate Widok na ratusz (View of the Town Hall) as especially successful. On the university plate he objected to the tree, and on the plate of the Bernardine Church he thought the bell tower took up too much space.

The National Library of Poland holds two copies, one of them digitized on Polona. The Lviv National Art Gallery holds ten loose sheets, and the Lviv Museum of the History of Religion holds one, showing the Carmelite church.

Cover

General view

Dormition (Wallachian) Church

View of the Town Hall

St. Mary's Square

University

Bernardine Church

Diet building

Governorate buildings

St. George's Cathedral

Carmelite Church

== Gallery ==
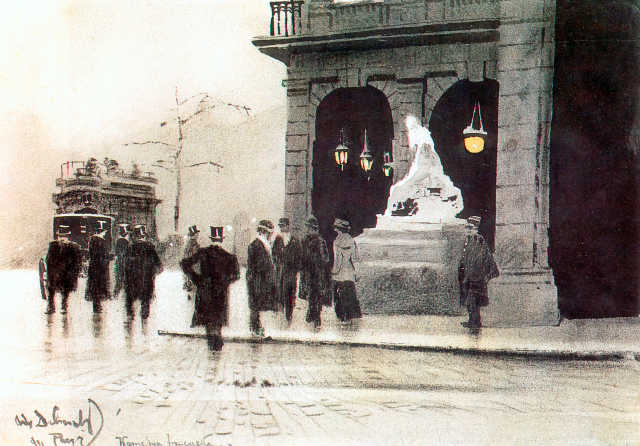
Comedie Française Paris
(1908)

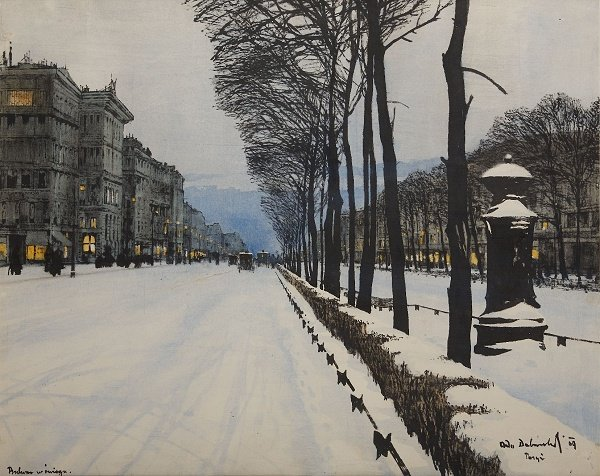
A Snowy Boulevard
(1909)

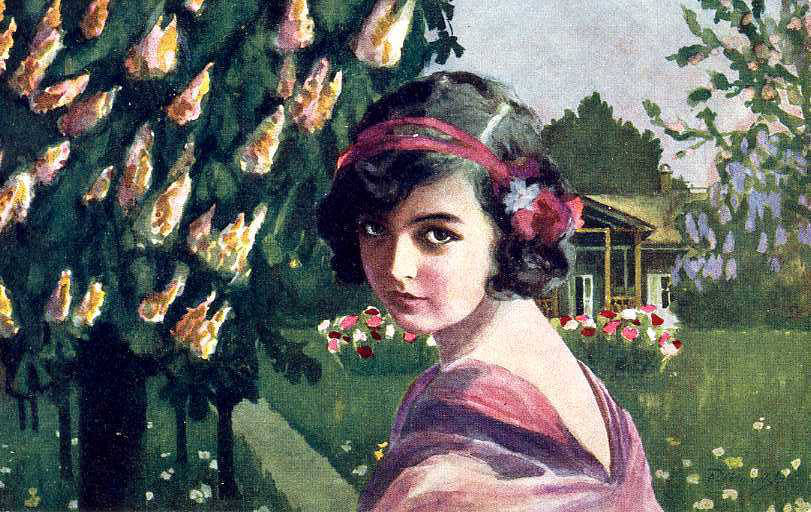
Spring
(ca. 1909)

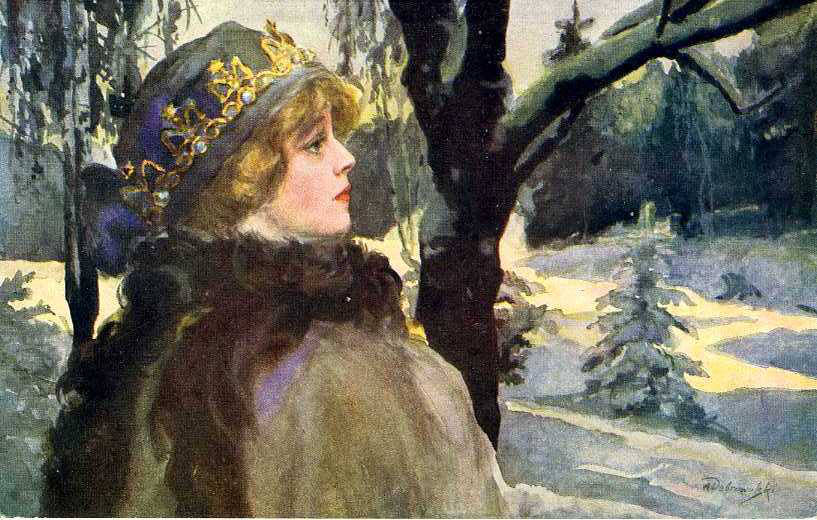
A Woman Standing in the Forest
(1910s)

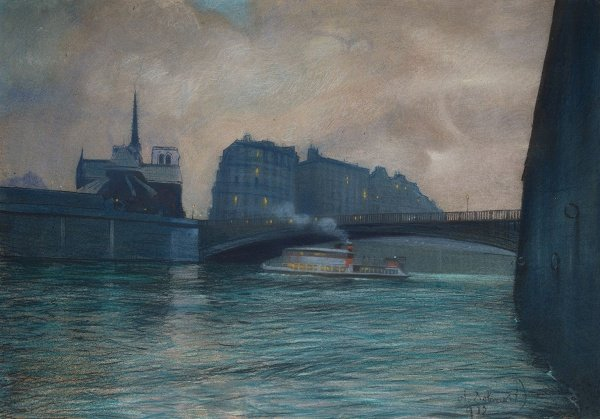
Paris by Night
(1912)

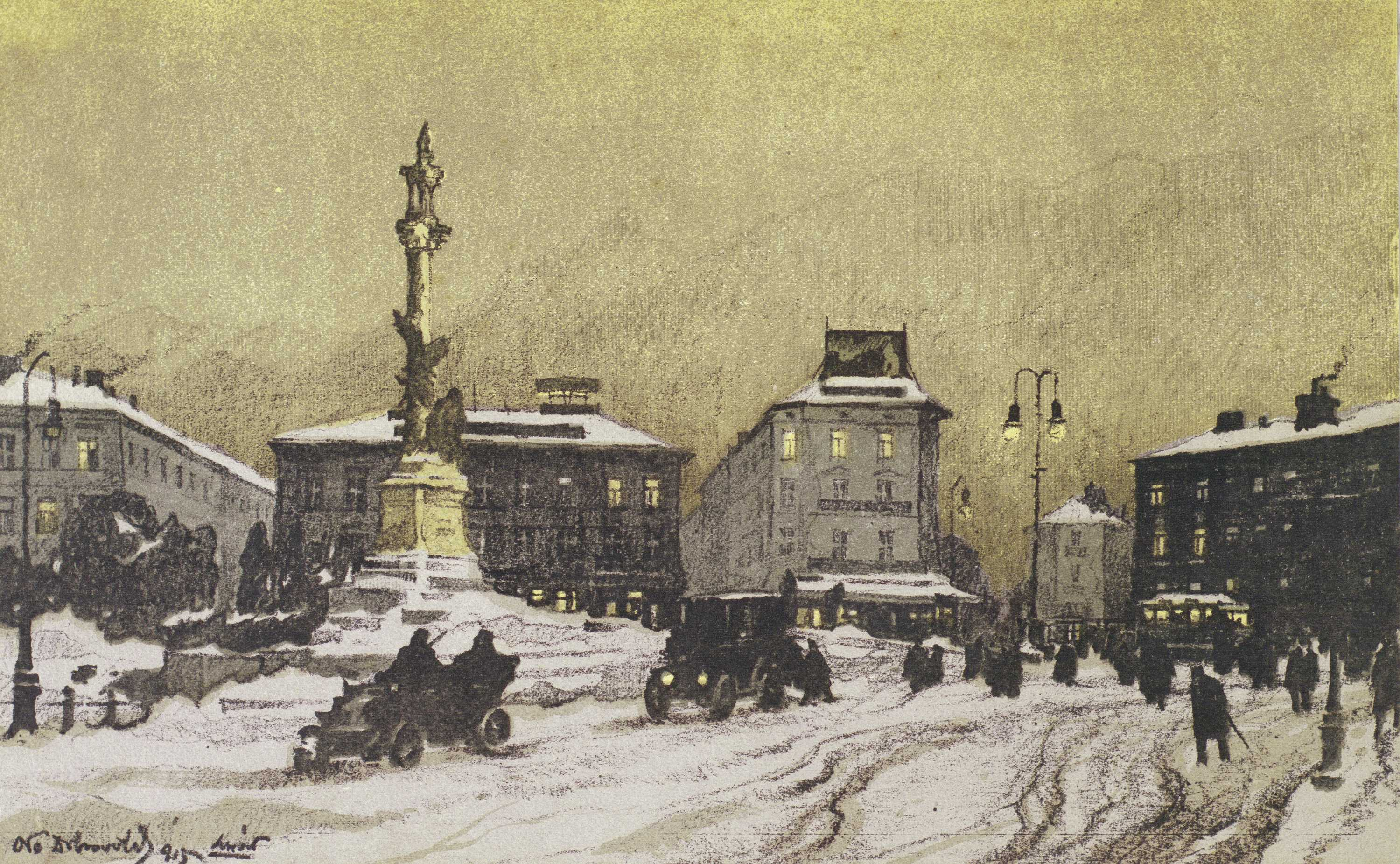
Adam Mickiewicz Monument in Lviv (lithography)
(1915)

== See also ==
- List of Polish painters
