= Erwin Elster =

Polish painter (1887–1977)

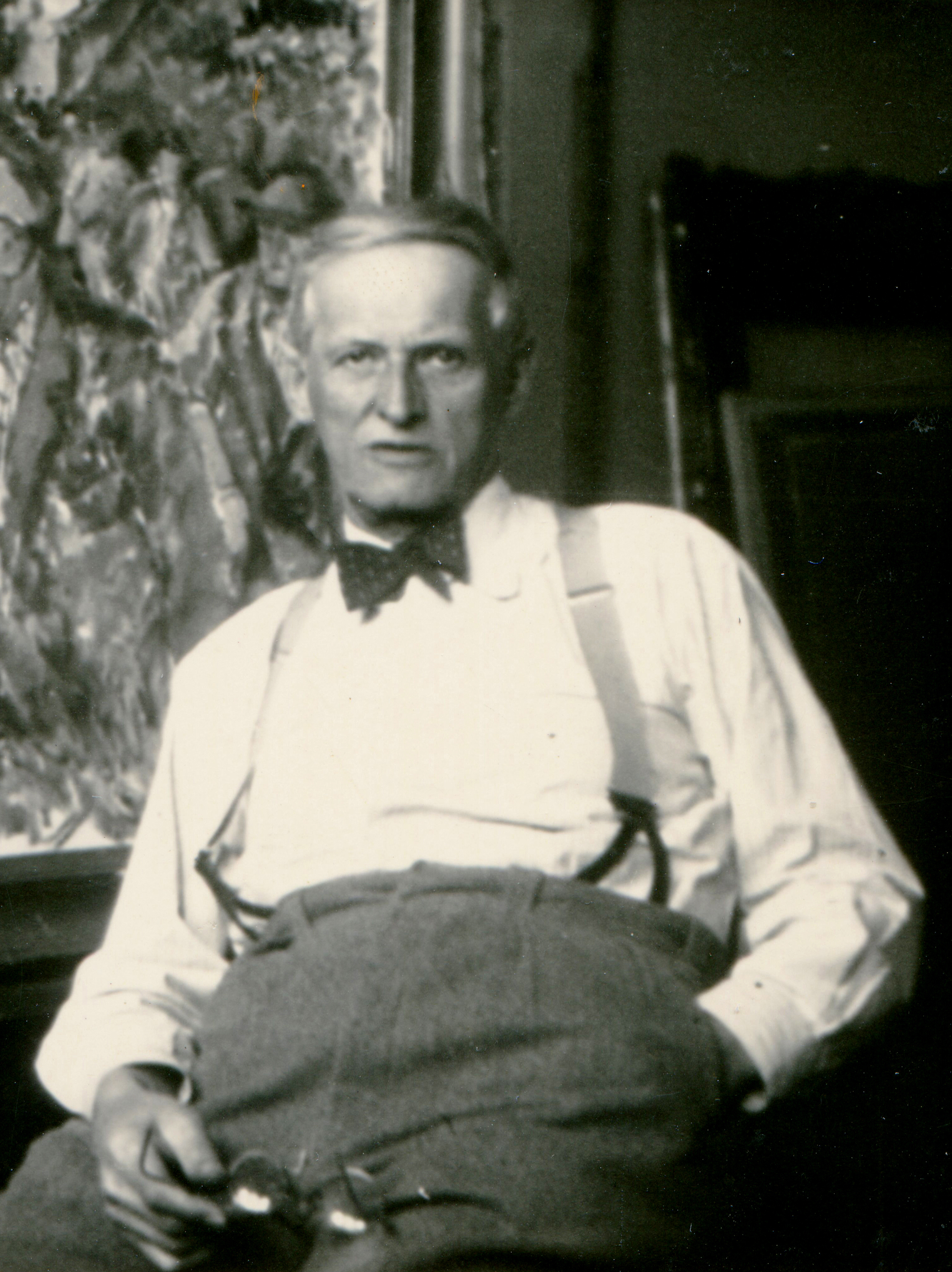
- Born: Erwin Elster; 8 May 1887; Korszów, Poland
- Died: 16 April 1977; Gdańsk, Poland
- Education: Jan Matejko Academy of Fine Arts in Kraków
- Known for: Painting
- Movement: Impressionism, Formalism, Socialist Realism
- Awards

Erwin Elster (8 May 1887 – 16 April 1977) was a Polish painter, pedagogue, and the co-founder of the Society of Artists "Świt" (Towarzystwa Artystów Plastyków "Świt").

Erwin Elster was born in Korszów. He completed his studies at the Jan Matejko Academy of Fine Arts in Kraków between the years of 1907 to 1912; where he was taught by Wojciech Weiss, Julian Fałat, and Józef Pankiewicz. He completed his artistic studies by which he was awarded one silver medal, and two bronze medals, as well as scholarships to Italy and France. For a year, between 1912 and 1913, he completed his further studies at the Académie de la Grande Chaumière in France. After travelling back to Kraków in 1913, he began his career as an artist, while undertaking his life as a pedagogue, where he made his artwork and taught for the next sixty years.

During World War I he spent his time in Bystra, where he resided with Julian Fałat. From this time came many of his watercolour impressionist paintings, as well as his landscape paintings of the region and its architecture.

Between the years of 1919 to 1954, he lived in Poznań where he taught and made his artwork. He taught painting and drawing at the University of Fine Arts in Poznań, and from 1922 at the Faculty of Architecture at the University of Technology in Poznań. He has also been active with the artists of region, co-founding the Society of Artists "Świt" (Towarzystwa Artystów Plastyków "Świt"), in which he exhibited his work since 1927. The first members of "Świt" were: Fryderyk Pautsch, Adam Ballenstedt, Bronisław Bartel, Wiktor Gosieniecki, Stanisław Jagmin, Mieczysław Lubelski, Władysław Roguski, Stefan Sonnewend, and Jan Jerzy Wroniecki. In the 1920s, he had taken part in the Formalism movement, and had been part of the Society of Polish Artists "Sztuka" (Towarzystwo Artystów Polskich "Sztuka"). In 1928, he had been part of Poznań's "Plastyka", following which he had also been part of the "Jednoróg" (Cech Artystów Plastyków Jednoróg), "Awangarda" (Awangarda Krakowska), and with the Lwów's "Nowa Generacja".

After World War II, he co-founded the Association of Polish Artists and Designers (Związek Polskich Artystów Plastyków), he also continued his work as a pedagogue, where he was a professor at the Academy of Fine Arts and the University of Technology in Łódź. During Socialist realism, the artist took part in a didactic role.

In 1954, he moved to Gdańsk, where he was a lecturer at the University of Technology in Gdańsk. In 1957, he was awarded with the Knight's Cross (Krzyż Kawalerski). In 1960, he retired as a professor, however he continued to work at the institution. In 1967, for his eightieth birthday and sixty-fifth anniversary of him being an artist, he was given an award by the Ministry of Culture and National Heritage. He died in Gdańsk, on 16 April 1977.

== Gallery ==
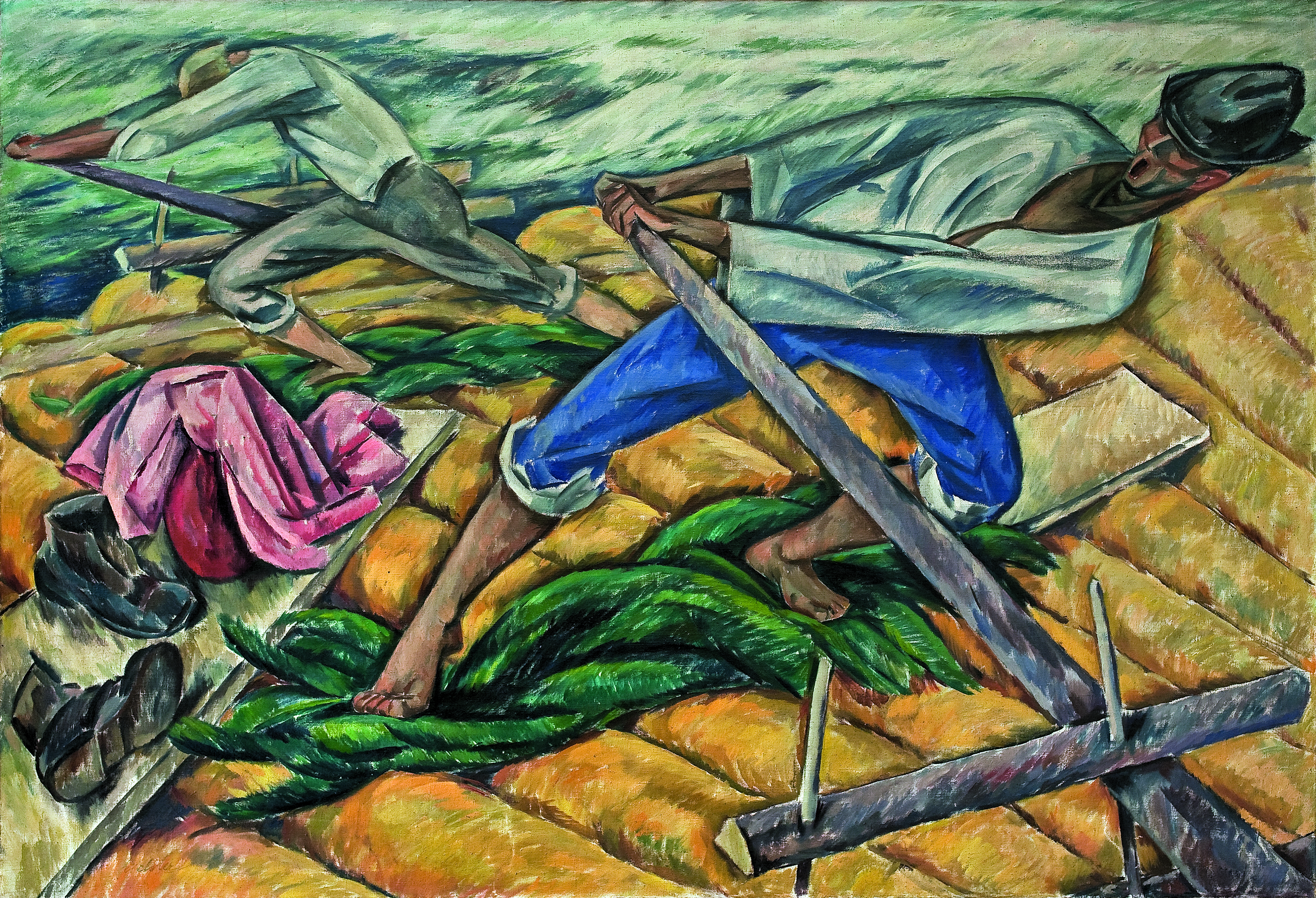
Flisacy
(1922)

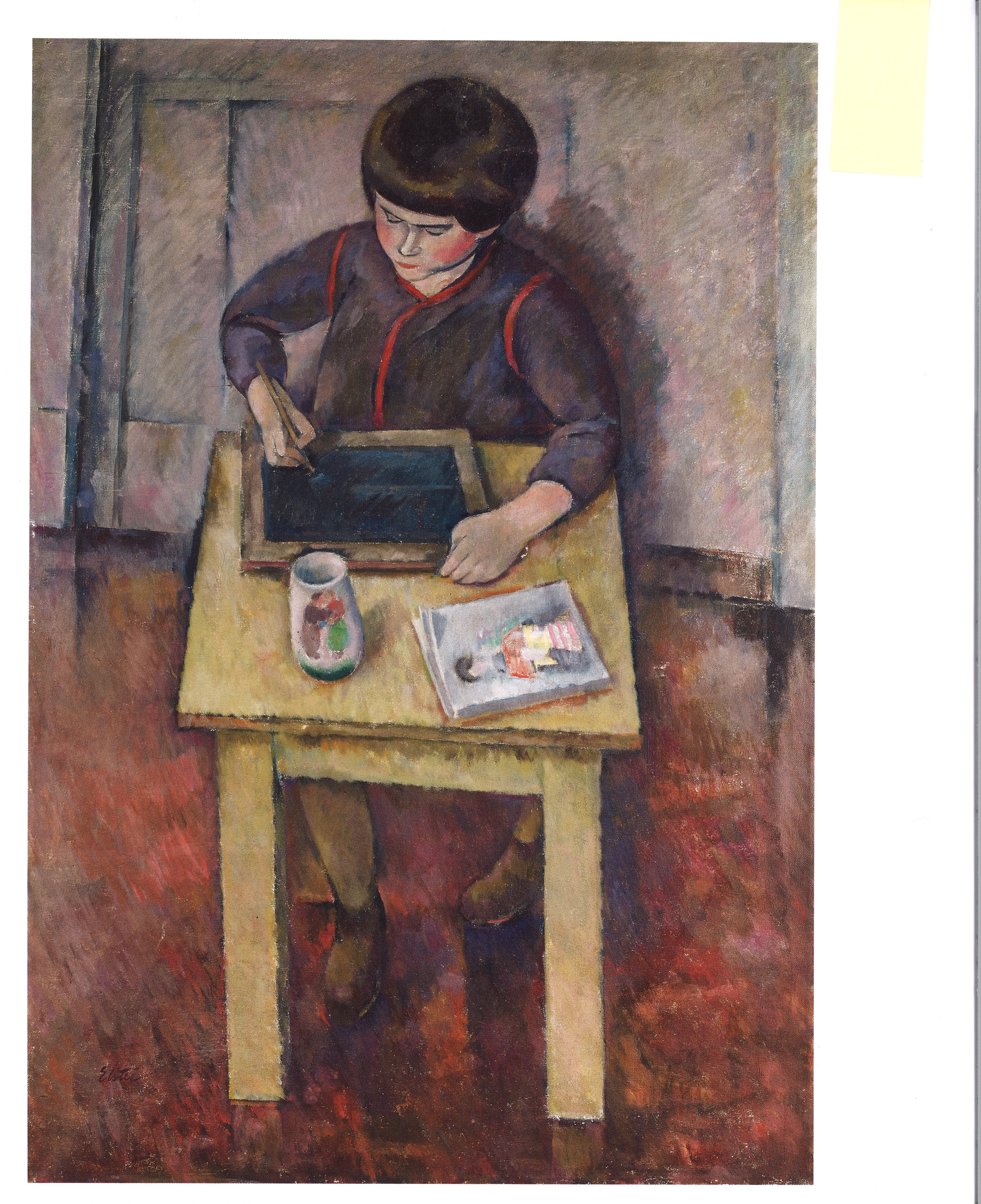
Synek
(1923)

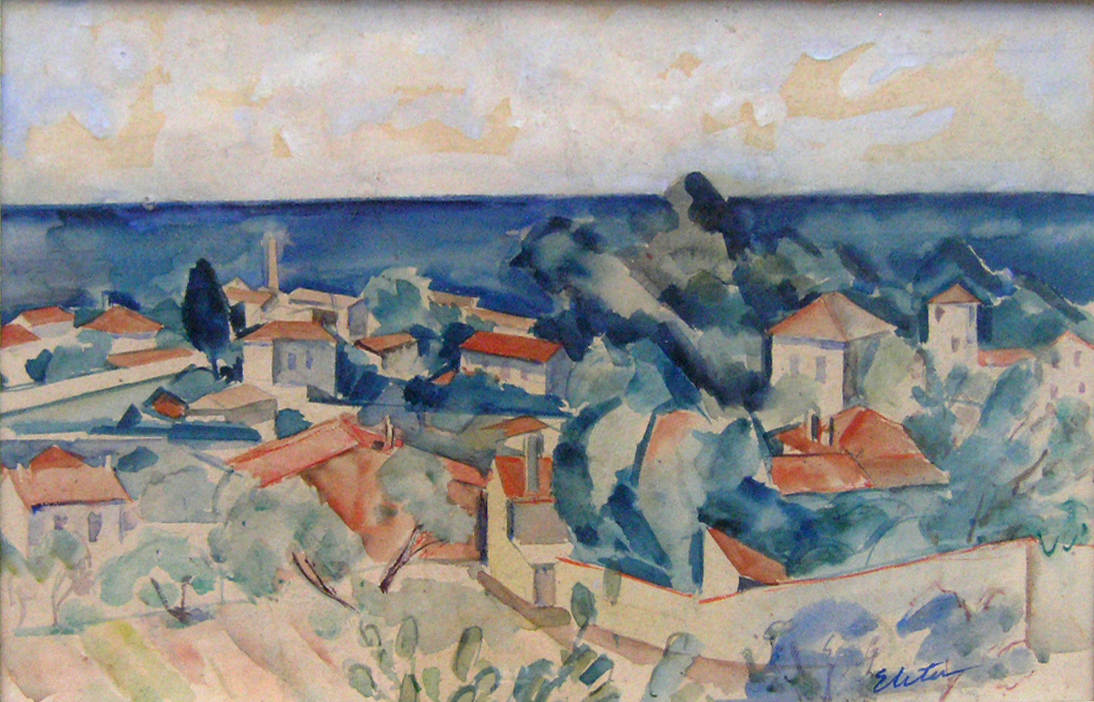
View of the Sea in Saint Tropez
(1925)

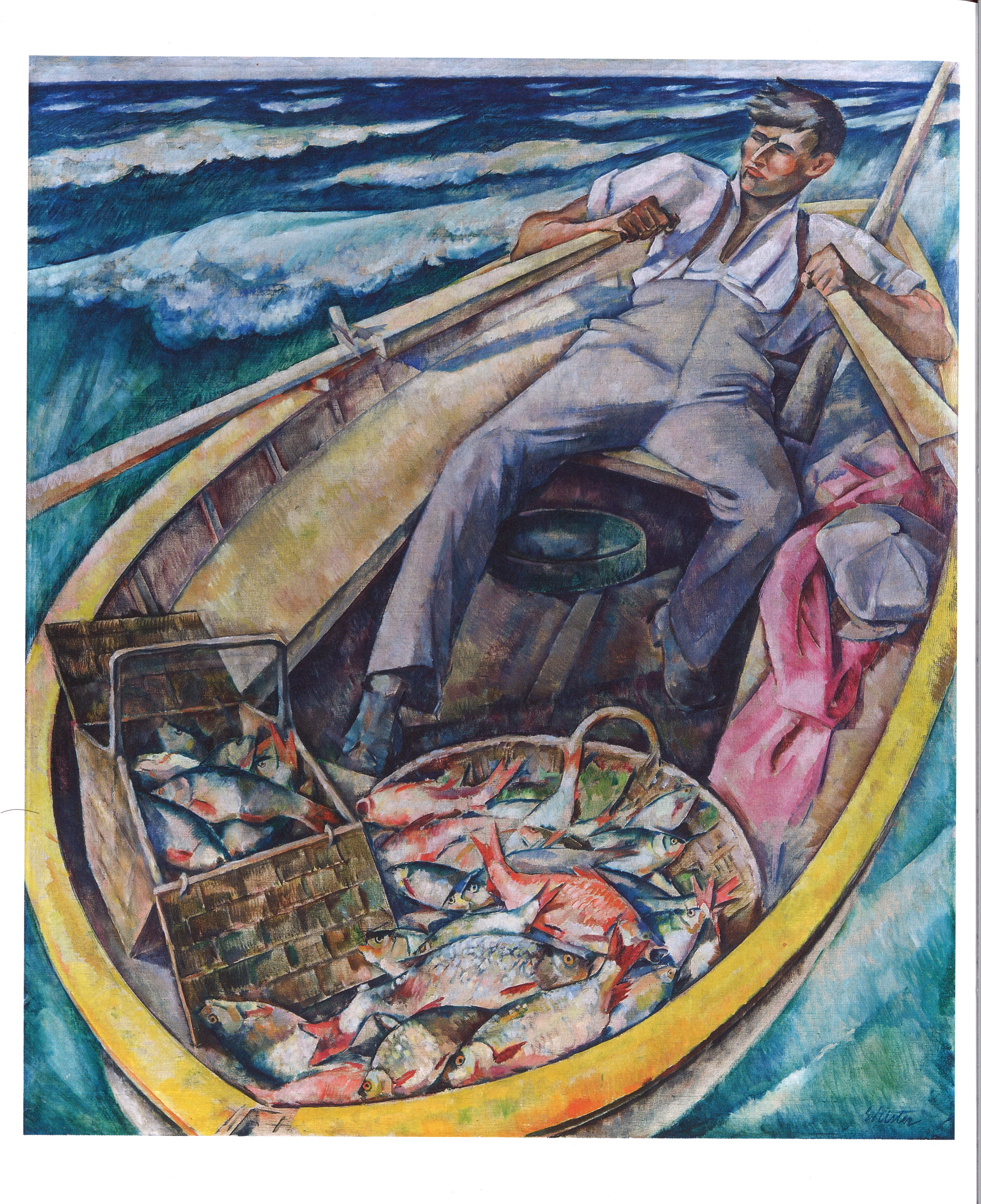
Rybak
(1926)

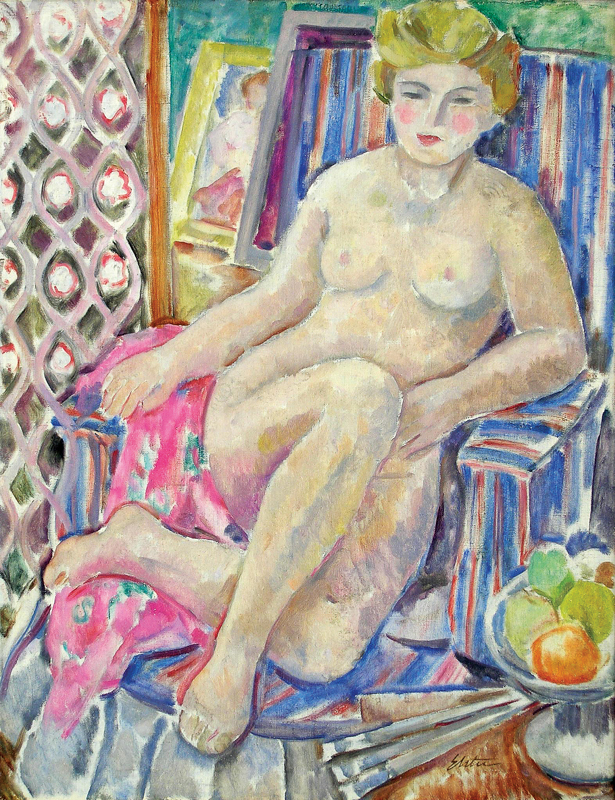
Akt IV
