= Ewa Juszkiewicz =

Polish painter (born 1984)

- Born: September 3, 1984 (age 41); Gdańsk, Poland
- Known for: Painting
- Notable work: Girl in Blue (2013); Grove (2014); Portrait of a Lady (After Louis Leopold Boilly) (2019)
- Movement: Surrealism

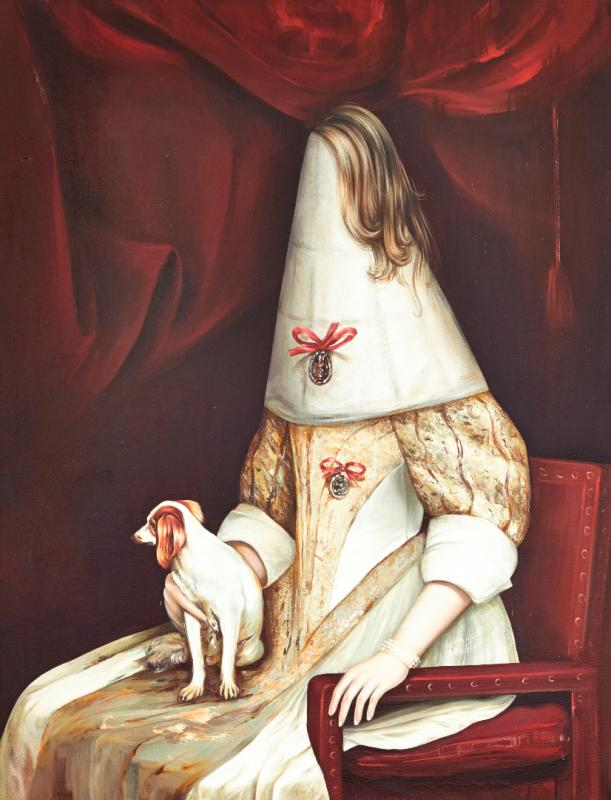
Untitled, 2013

Ewa Juszkiewicz (Polish pronunciation: [ˈɛva juʂˈkjɛvit͡ʂ]; born 3 September 1984 in Gdańsk) is a Polish surrealist painter. She is a graduate of the Academy of Fine Arts in Gdańsk and the Kraków Academy of Fine Arts. She is considered one of the best-known contemporary Polish artists.

== Career and style ==
Between 2004 and 2009, she studied at the Academy of Fine Arts in Gdańsk. She is a member of the AAA Tanie Wizualki collective.

Among the distinguishing features of the artist's works are surrealist female portraits inspired by classic 18th and 19th-century paintings. She is notable for masking the faces of the subjects of her portraits with locks of hair, bunches of flowers, shells or fabrics. By reinterpreting Flemish masterpieces Juszkiewicz seeks to redress historical failures in the artistic portrayal of women who were often relegated to being little more than anonymous objects of beauty. According to art critic Lucia Longhi, Juszkiewicz "dismantled these old paradigms that hid a woman's personality and visualized a new role for them" adding that "By deconstructing the original painting, she deconstructs the conventions behind it."

In 2013, she was awarded the Grand Prix at the Bielska Jesień Biennale organized by the Galeria BWA in Bielsko-Biała, Poland, for her two portraits: Girl in Blue and Untitled (After Rogier van der Weyden).

In 2014, she was included in the book 100 Painters of Tomorrow published by Thames & Hudson, discussing the most promising young painters in the world. In 2018, she appeared in the Kompas Młodej Sztuki ranking compiled by Rzeczpospolita in partnership with a number of galleries of contemporary art in Poland.

In 2023, her art was used as the design for a luxury handbag from fashion house Louis Vuitton as part of the artist's collaboration on the fifth edition of the brand's Artycapucines collection.

== Art market ==
In May 2022, her 2019 painting titled Portrait of a Lady (After Louis Leopold Boilly) sold for $1.56 million at an auction in the United States. All the proceeds from the sale were donated to Warsaw's POLIN Museum of the History of Polish Jews. As Ana Maria Celis observes, in this work the artist tackles the problem of historical erasure of women through a singular and subversive technique. She further states that "The juxtaposition of the classical stylization with the evocative subject matter of a female sitter's whose head is fully wrapped sparks new narratives around portrayals of femininity and deconstructs the past to create new dialogues."

== See also ==
- List of Polish artists
- List of Polish painters
- Culture of Poland
- Women in art
- Contemporary art
