= Maxim Bugzester =

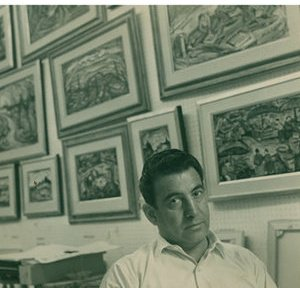
Photograph of expressionist Polish painter, Maxim Bugzester

Maxim Bugzester (August 31, 1909 – October 21, 1978) was a Polish painter born in Stanislaviv, now Ivano-Frankivsk, Ukraine then in Poland, of Ruthenian-Jewish parents.

Bugzester grew up in Vienna, studied at the Academy in Vienna, and then at age fourteen studied with the German Expressionist Karl Schmidt-Rottluff. He moved to France and worked with Pierre Bonnard and later, for over two years, with Georges Braque. In 1935, he moved to the United States, and served in the United States Army during World War II.

Bugzester's work is known for its innovative brushwork, vibrant colours, and sometimes stark manner of representation; his art ranges from displaying existential topics (his many faceless figures with uncertain purpose) and bold landscapes to more classical (nude bathers) and everyday subjects (park settings, still lifes). His work is often overlooked in its connection to its mid and early twentieth-century European origins; his relationship with Braque (both personal and artistic) is subtle though clear in some of his work (revealing some moments of Cubist influence), but the legacy in much of his art most strongly reveals its roots in Fauvism and, in a larger context, Expressionism.

He painted, exhibited (often at the Panoras Gallery), exhibited Gallery d'Hautbar, New York City in 1969, and taught art in New York until his death on October 21, 1978.
