= Aleksandra Urban =

Polish painter

Aleksandra Urban (born 17 March 1978) is a Polish painter. Diploma in painting at the Faculty of Painting and Sculpture at the Academy of Fine Arts in Wrocław. Scholarships of the Ministry of Culture and National Heritage in 1998 and 2003.
