= Katarzyna Karpowicz =

Polish painter

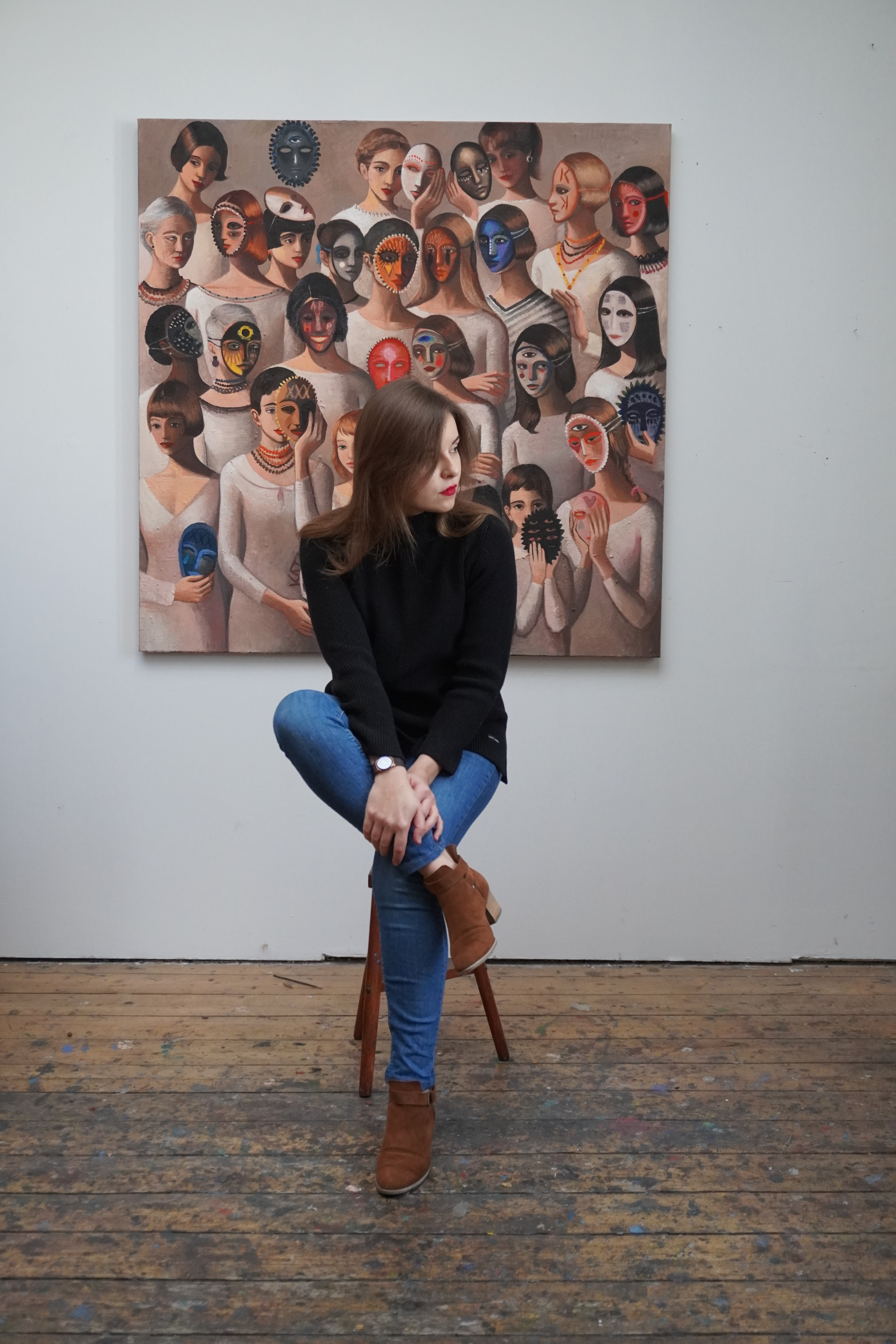
- Born: 4 November 1985; Kraków, Poland
- Education: Grzegorz Bednarski; Leszek Misiak; Academy of Fine Arts in Cracow
- Known for: painting

Katarzyna Karpowicz (4 November 1985) is a Polish contemporary painter.

== Biography ==
Karpowicz was born in Kraków to Anna Karpowicz-Westner (maiden name Wiejak) and Sławomir Karpowicz (1952–2001), both painters. Her father was a professor of art at Cracow Academy of Fine Arts. Parents, together with their daughters Joanna and Katarzyna lived and painted in the studio on Piłsudzkiego Street previously owned by Olga Boznańska. In 2005 she graduated from art high school Państwowe Liceum Sztuk Plastycznych and began her studies at National School of Fine Arts in Cracow. Until 2008, she studied under Grzegorz Bednarski. She graduated with honors in 2010 under Leszek Misiak. Katarzyna Karpowicz's works can be found in collections in Poland and abroad, as well as in the collection of the Museum of Contemporary Art in Gdansk. She lived and painted in Budapest (2013–2015) and later in England (2015–2016) in Pangbourne. She is a figurative painter. In 2019 she was awarded Anna Maria Siemieńska Grazella Foundation's artistic scholarship for young artists. She gave several interviews discussing her artistic heritage and musical taste. In an interview in Magyar Nemzet a Hungarian art critic talks about influences of Budapest on Karpowicz's art.

== Critical reception ==
Between 2017 and 2019 she placed in top three of young Polish painters in a prestigious competition Young artist compass. Her art received positive comments from several independent art critics. Art critic Małgorzata Czyńska mentions that her paintings combine childlike beauty and somewhat naïve trust, but are streaked with fear and the experience of the cruelty of fate. The same critic writes that Katarzyna Karpowicz's works are deeply universal and existential, revolving around relationships, expectations, hope and fears. Samanta Belling indicates that Karpowicz's works prove that there are still young artists who live for art and are able to create an atmosphere that evokes memories. She states that "Katarzyna Karpowicz seems to be out of this epoch, as if she were living beyond the time, just like her paintings. By deliberately simplifying the form of her work, she gives us room for impressions, guesses and personal interpretations." Kama Wróbel opines that each new series of Karpowicz's work has deep meaning and provides a point of departure for multi-faceted consideration of the human condition. Art historian Stanisław Tabisz writes about Karpowicz's fascinations with the circus in Budapest, solar eclipse observed with her father in their hometown of Szczebrzeszyn and youthful influences in her paintings. He goes on to state that "Katarzyna Karpowicz's paintings express, in their sincere and straightforward message, the connection of each of us with the world, of experiencing everything in a unique and exceptional way." Daniel Czepiński writes that one finds oneself in Karpowicz's studio surrendered by magical trees, doors and openings which all lead to new worlds. Adam Szczuciński finds captivating charm of the unknown in her paintings. He also writes in his essay A physician's viewpoint that Karpowicz's "powerful talent makes it truly impossible to remain indifferent to her small-sized images" and he concludes that "they infect the memory and stay like afterimages on the retina after we close our eyes." Ewa Ogłoza in art journal artPaper writes that she is enchanted with Katarzyna Karpowicz's paintings and delighted with her life attitude and art "characterized by gratitude, kindness, humility, seriousness, mindfulness and tenderness towards the world, people and culture". She states that Karpowicz loves to paint and looks for consolation and hope in art "by designing her own fears, hopes, dreams, she gives comfort to others".

== Exhibitions, awards and distinctions ==
=== Solo exhibitions ===
- 2011 · January, “The meeting”, 2 Worlds Gallery, Krakow, Poland
- 2011 · May, “Let’s go to sleep!”, The Night of Museums, Art Gallery, Warsaw, Poland
- 2011 · May, “Transition”, BWA Gallery, Zamosc, Poland
- 2011 · December, “In my dreams”, Art Gallery, Warsaw, Poland
- 2012 · January, “Between light and shadow”, The Cracow Museum of Pharmacy, Cracow, Poland
- 2012 · August, “Horizon”, OdDo Gallery, Gdynia, Poland
- 2013 · April, “Man and animal”, The Mazovia Region Centre of Culture and Arts – Elektor Gallery, Warsaw
- 2013 · October, “Katarzyna Karpowicz – painting”, Klub Adwokatow, Krakow
- 2014 · March, “On the road”, Platon Gallery, Wroclaw
- 2014 · November, “The life of the image”, Szép Műhely Gallery, Budapest, Hungary
- 2015 · October, “Harold and Ernest”, St. Bartholomew's Church, Lower Basildon, UK
- 2016 · April, “Genius Loci”, Artemis Gallery, Krakow
- 2017 · April, “Human Stories”, Promocyjna Gallery, Warsaw
- 2017 · October, “Goodbye, Till Tomorrow”, Triada Gallery, Gdańsk
- 2018 · April, “The Teatre of the Everyday”, Raven Gallery, Kraków
- 2018 · December, “Blue Glass”, Art Gallery, Warsaw
- 2019 · November, “Litte Big Life”, Platon Gallery, Wrocław

=== Selected group exhibitions ===
- 2007 · “Landschaft als suggestive Vision von Licht und Raum”, group exhibition, Steyr, Austria
- 2011 · “100 years of ZPAP Krakow” Art Palace – Cracow, Poland
- 2011 · Yokohama Akarenga Soko – presenting young artists from Yokohama & Krakow – Yokohama, Japan
- 2012 · Katarzyna and Joanna Karpowicz, “Art saves life”, Galeria Fundacji Promocji Sztuki Współczesnej, Warsaw, Poland
- 2013 · “Zakynthos 2013”, Stalowa Gallery, Warsaw
- 2014 · “4 x Karpowicz”, Raven Gallery, Kraków
- 2015 · “Exercise”, Platan Gallery, Budapest
- 2015 · Exhibition of paintings and sculptures of the Krakow Branch of the Association of Polish Artists and Designers, Centrum Gallery, Nowa Huta centre for culture, Krakow
- 2015 · “The Abstract, the Figure”, contemporary painting created in Kraków, MANK Gallery, Szentendre, Hungary
- 2015 · Christmas exhibition of the Krakow branch of the association of Polish Artists and Designers, Arts Palace, Krakow
- 2016 · “8 women”, Regional Society for the Promotion of Fine Arts, Konduktorownia, Czestochowa
- 2016 · “Espacios, ciudades, arquitecturas, gente”, Galeria de Arte Montsequi, Madrid, Spain
- 2017 · “Small Format”, exhibition of the Krakow District of the Association of Polish Artists and Designers, Raven Gallery, Krakow
- 2017 · “Configurations”, Krakow Artistic Meetings, Association of Polish Artists and Designers, Art Bunker, Krakow
- 2017 · “Leszek Misiak and Students”, Centrum Gallery, Nowa Huta Cultural Centre, Academy of Fine Arts Gallery, Krakow
- 2018 · “Realism, Two Perspectives”, BWA Gallery, Bydgoszcz
- 2018 · “Karpowicze”, exhibition of the Karpowicz family as a part of Capital of a Polish Language Festival, Szczebrzeszyn
- 2018 · “XIV Aniversario”, Galeria de Arte Montsequi, Madrid, Spain
- 2019 · “Art now”, pre auction exhibition, National Museum in Kraków
- 2019 · “Young Polish Painting”, National Museum in Gdansk, Contemporary Art Department

=== Selected book illustrations ===
- Kasia Skrzynkowska, Balony
- Wacław Oszajca, Uwierz mu na słowo, Felietony, Wydawnictwo WAM, 2015.
