= Wacław Wąsowicz =

Polish painter and printmaker

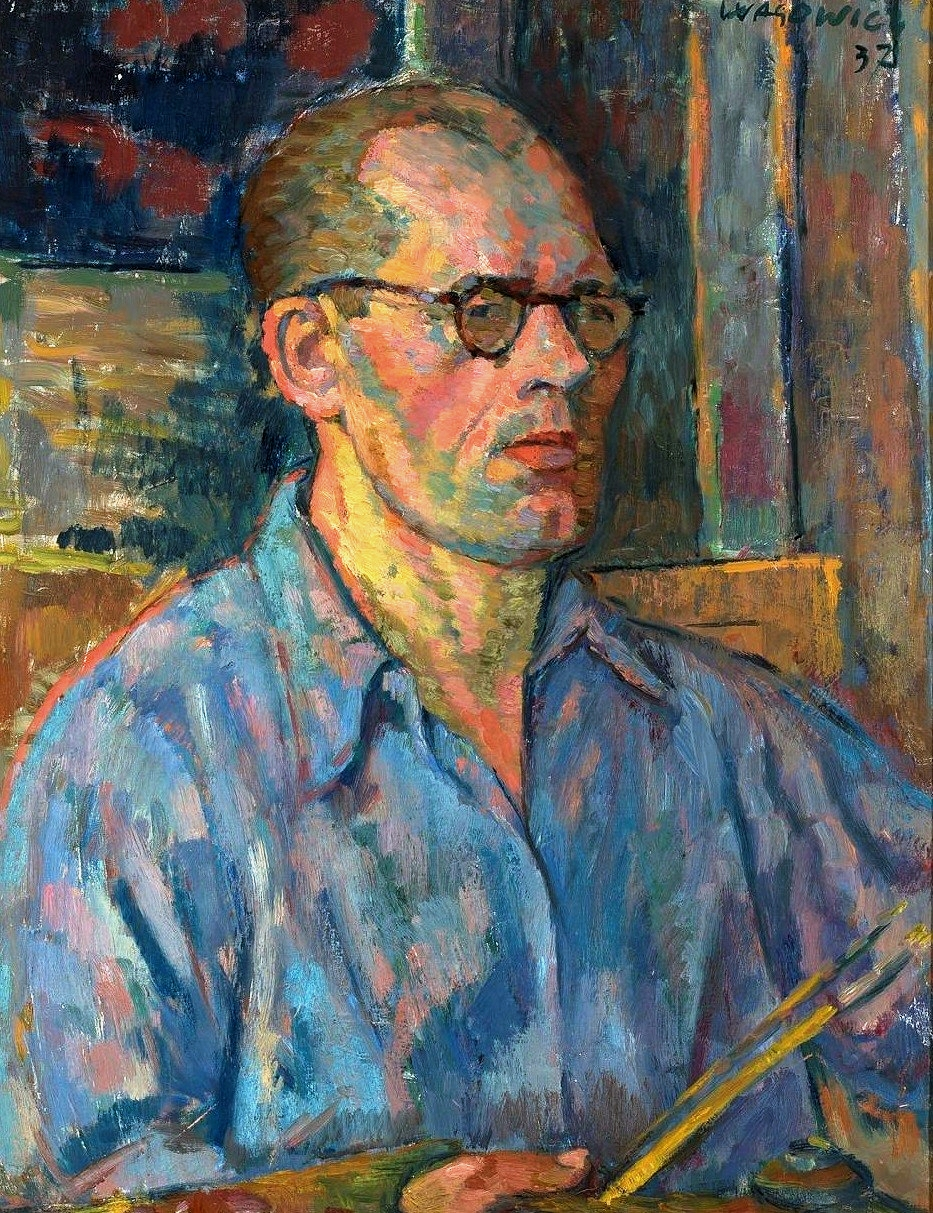
- Self-portrait of Wacław Wąsowicz (1937)
- Born: 25 August 1891; Warsaw, Poland
- Died: 6 October 1942 (aged 51); Warsaw, Poland
- Education: School of Fine Arts in Warsaw
- Known for: Painting
- Movement: Fauvism
- Spouse: Janina Raabe-Wąsowiczowa

Wacław Wąsowicz (25 August 1891 – 6 October 1942) was a Polish painter and printmaker.

Wacław Wasowicz studied art with Wojciech Gerson (1909–1910), afterwards he studied at the School of Fine Arts in Warsaw (1911–1914), where he was taught by Ignacy Pieńkowski. He had also studied at the Jan Matejko Academy of Fine Arts in Kraków, where he was a student of Jacek Malczewski (1914). He had made his artwork using trompe-l'œil, printmaking, watercolour, he painted on fabric, and on ceramic.

His wife Janina Raabe-Wąsowiczowa was a social worker, and a member of the Konrad Żegota Committee.

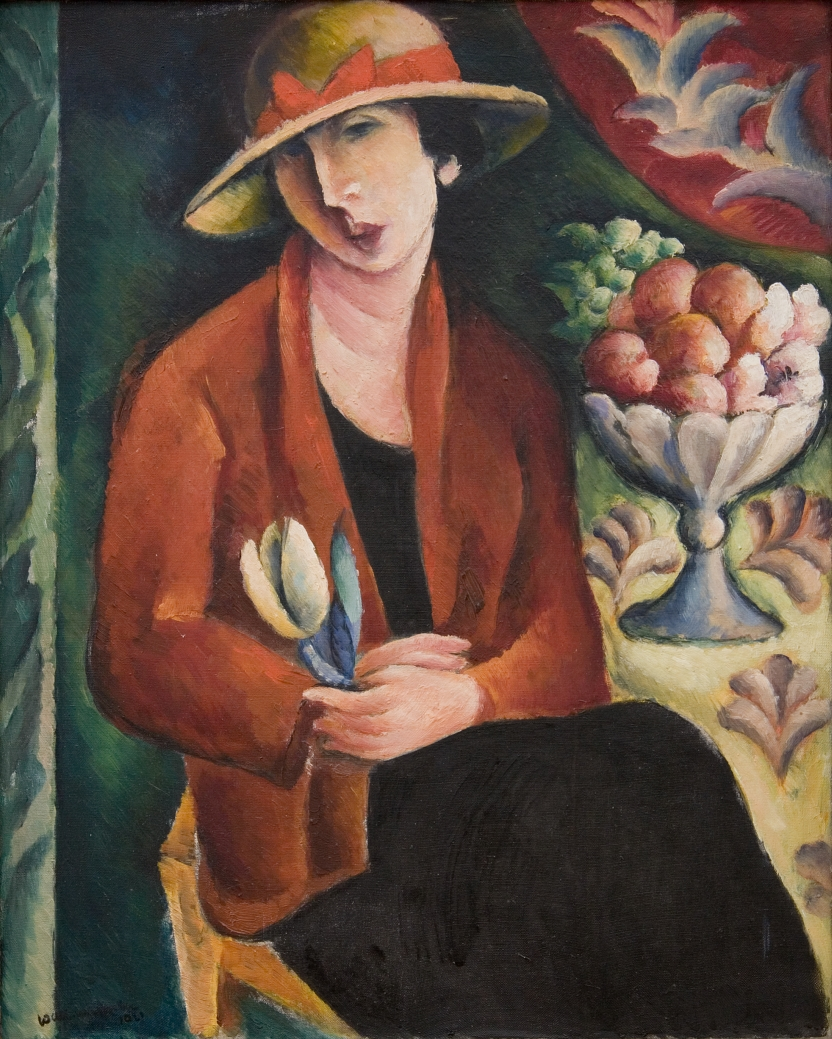
Portrait of Lady with Tulips
(1921)

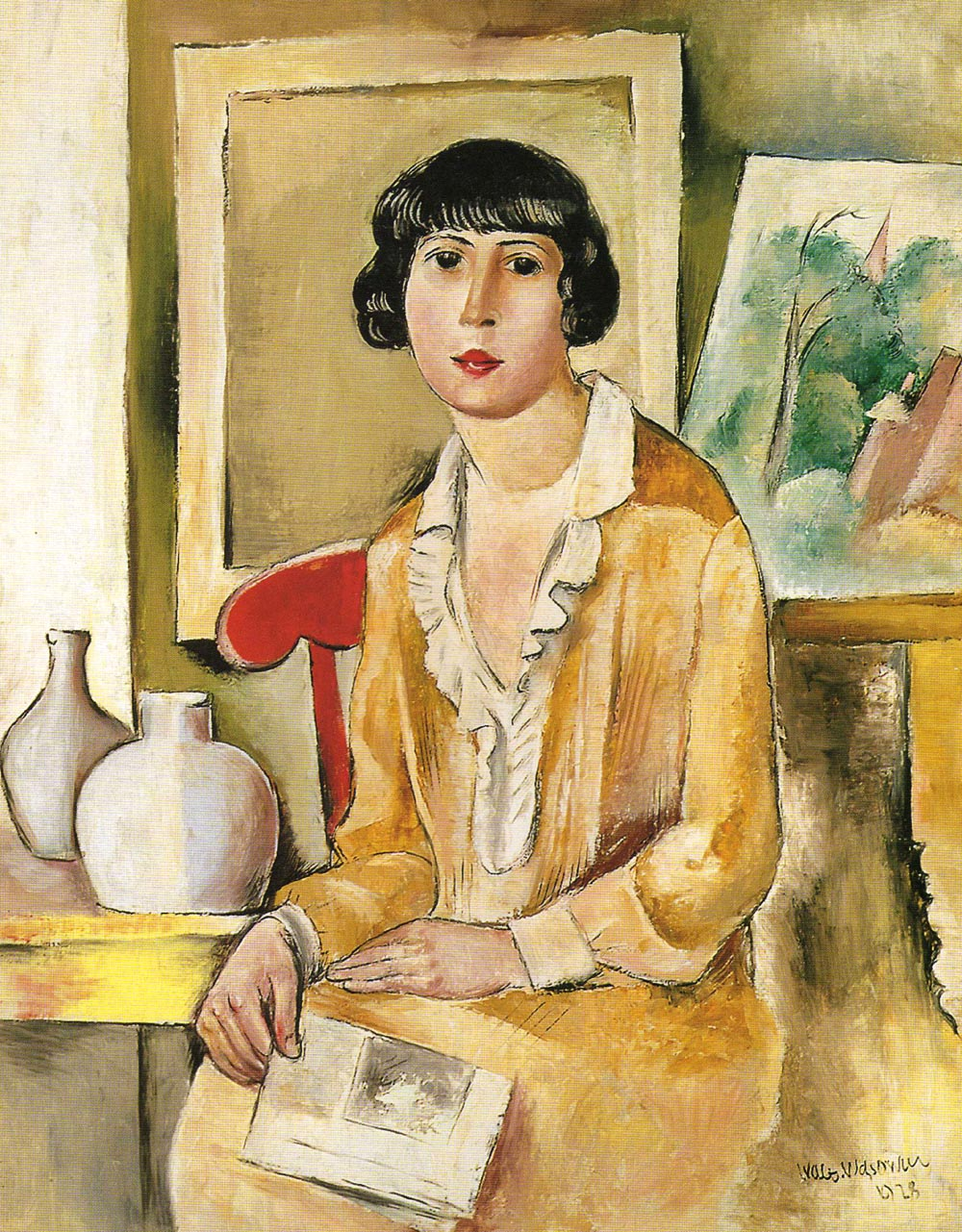
Portrait of Wife
(1928)
