= Jan Betley =

Polish painter (1908–1980)

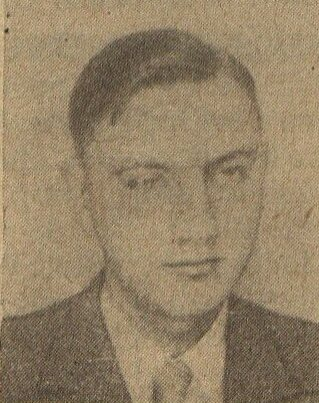
- Horse race, a 1938 oil painting
- Born: 28 February 1908; Płock, Poland
- Died: 4 April 1980 (aged 72); Warsaw
- Education: Warsaw Academy of Fine Arts
- Known for: painter

Jan Betley (1908 – 1980) was a Polish painter.

Betley was born in Płock. Before the World War II, he was a student of two well-known Polish painters, Tadeusz Pruszkowski and Felicjan Kowarski, at the Academy of Fine Arts in Warsaw (ASP). In 1936, he graduated under the advisory of Pruszkowski and qualified himself as the assistant-professor in 1948. Most of his early paintings were lost during the war time. After the war he taught at the ASP.

He was a member of the Fourth Group advocating traditional subjects and perfectionism of technique. He is known for his portraits, landscapes, paintings of horses, battle scenes and genre pieces. He was closely related to Polish Colourism. His works can be found in Polish museums and in private collections in Poland and England.

Betley died in Warsaw at age 72.
