= Ryszard Woźniak =

Polish painter, performer and teacher

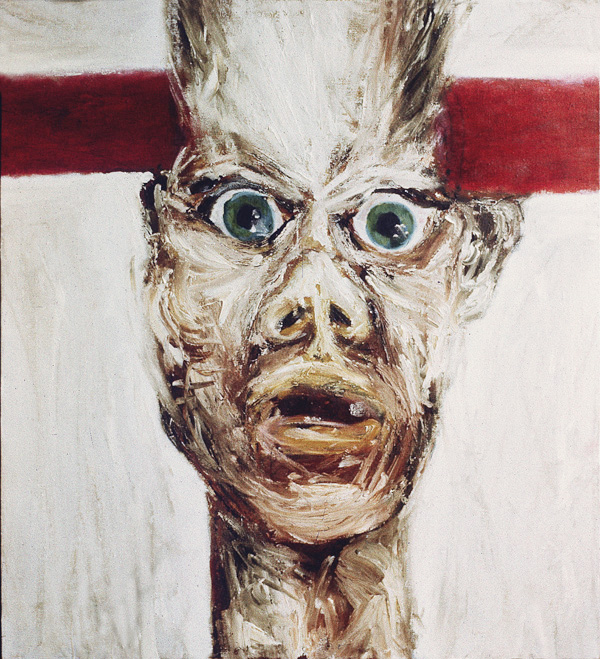
- Self-portrait with crossbar (1985)
- Born: Ryszard Woźniak; 13 June 1956 (age 70); Białystok, Poland
- Education: Academy of Fine Arts in Warsaw
- Known for: Painting
- Movement: Neo-expressionism

Ryszard Woźniak (born 13 June 1956 in Białystok) is a Polish painter, performer and teacher.

Between 1976 and 1981 Woźniak studied at the Academy of Fine Arts in Warsaw, under Stefan Gierowski. In the years 1982-1988 he taught art at his home university. Since 1982, he was involved in Gruppa, having participated in almost all the artist group's exhibitions and campaigns, as well as having co-wrote its newsletter "Oh well" ("Oj dobrze już"). Between 1985 and 1989, together with Marek Sobczyk, Woźniak worked on the polychromy of the Neo Greek-Catholic Church of St. Nicholas, Kostomloty in the Podlaskie Voivodeship. In 1986, the artist and Ryszard Grzyb went for a scholarship to West Berlin. In 1991/1992 he lectured at the private Art School in Warsaw, founded and run by Jarosław Modzelewski and Marek Sobczyk. Since c.1992-93, he runs a painting studio at the University of Zielona Góra.

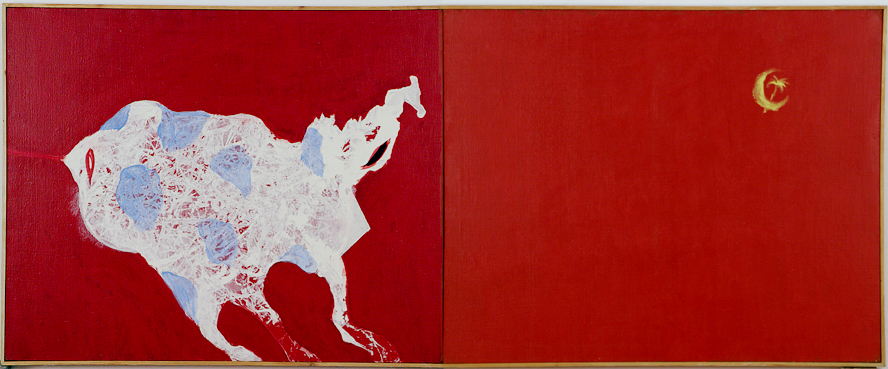
A new wave of popies
(1982)

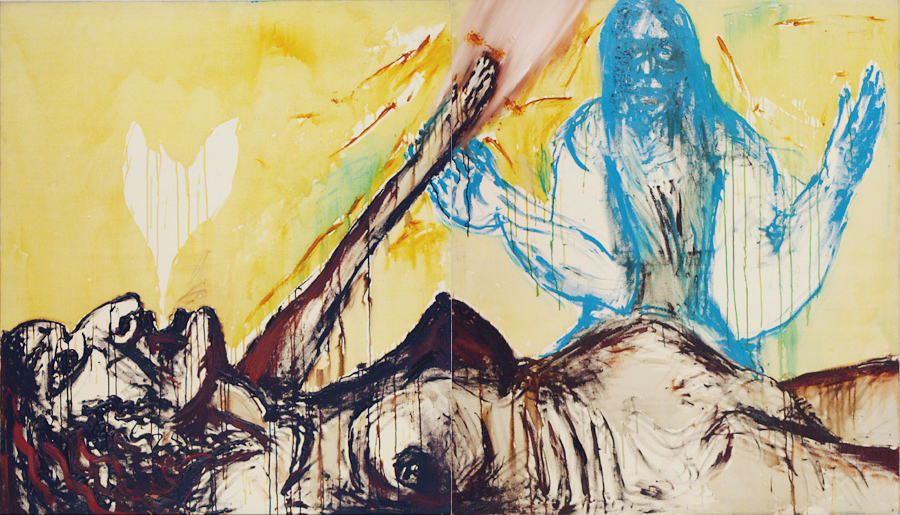
Damsel get up
(1984)

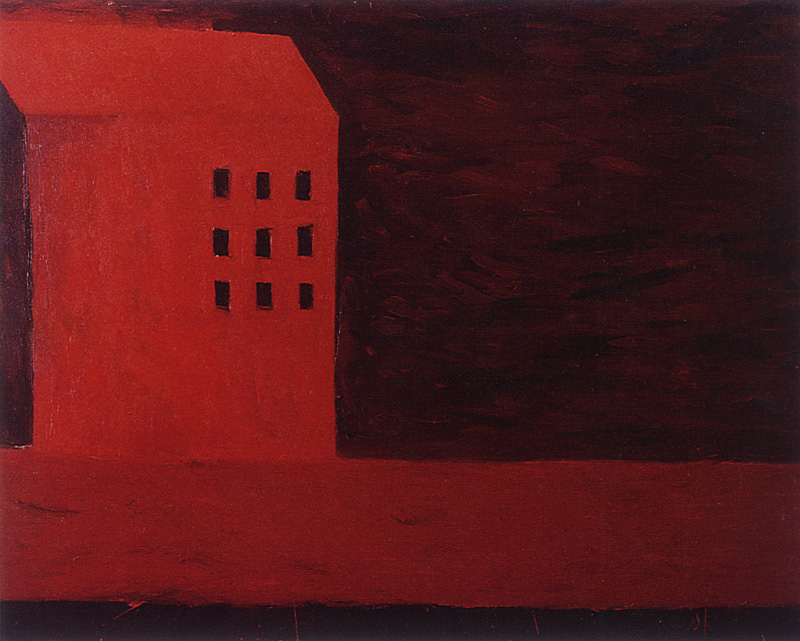
Home for the incurably ill
(1987)
