= Hilary Krzysztofiak =

Polish painter and graphic artist

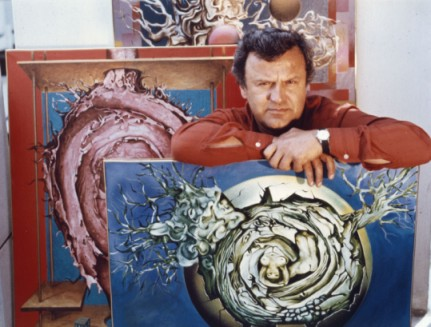
- Hilary Krzysztofiak, Munich 1975
- Born: Hilary Krzysztofiak; 28 October 1926; Szopienice, Poland
- Died: 30 September 1979 (aged 53); Falls Church, Virginia, United States
- Known for: Painting

Hilary Krzysztofiak (born 28 October 1926 in Szopienice, now a part of Katowice, died 30 September 1979 in Falls Church, Virginia near Washington) was a Polish painter, graphic artist and set designer.

== Young years and education ==
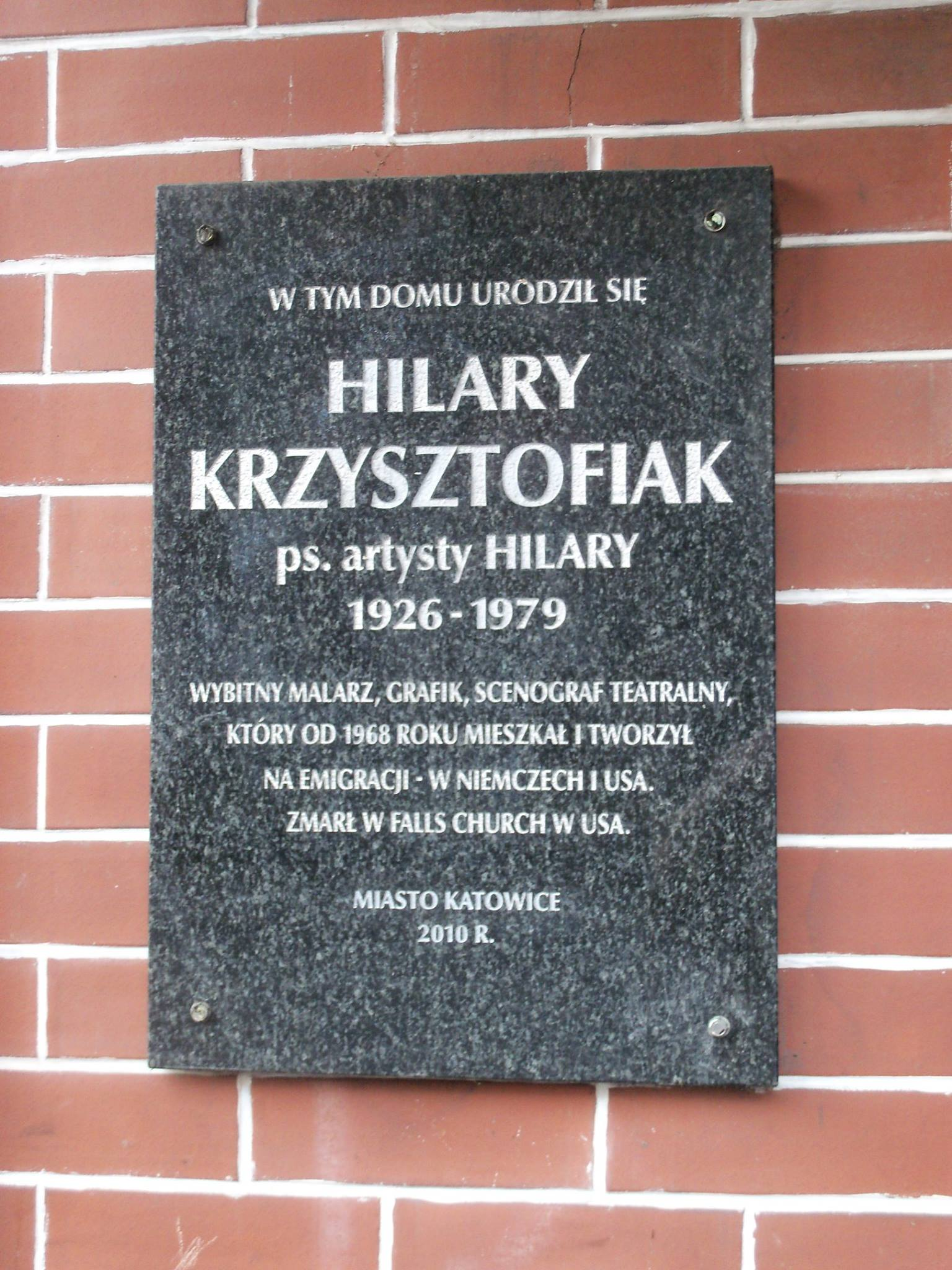
Memorial plaque at Hilary Krzysztofiak's birthplace at Wiosny Ludów Street, Katowice

Hilary was a son of Jan Krzysztofiak and Maria née Helwig. His mother was killed by the Germans in 1942 at Auschwitz concentration camp during the German occupation of Poland (World War II). During the war, he worked in the Uthemann's steelworks in Szopienice as an apprentice carpenter and as a student for 3 years of evening school (Abendschule für Bildende Künste), finishing in 1943. After the war he left for Warsaw where in 1945-1946 he went to art college. From January 1946, he worked as an extra in the Polish Theatre (Teatr Polski) in the first post-war production of Juliusz Słowacki’s Lilla Weneda. In the same year, he produced his first theatre decorations for the production of The Story of Doctor Dolittle in the Puppet Theatre in Warsaw.

In September 1946, he was accepted in the State School of Fine Arts (later: Academy of Fine Arts) where he studied block design, architectural painting, studies of nature, decorative and wall painting, technology, painting and conceptual design. As a student he worked for The Academic Theatre. In 1950-1951, Krzysztofiak started to co-operate with the literary-political magazine Po prostu where he published (among others) articles written with Lech Emfazy Stefański ("New Way of Visual Arts", 1950, no. 13, and "Talks of Realism on Visual Arts", 1950, no 3), criticized later at the Congress of Young Activists from Schools of Fine Arts. In spring 1951 he abandoned studies at the Academy in the course of working on his diploma (picture "Waryński before the Jury").

== Poland ==
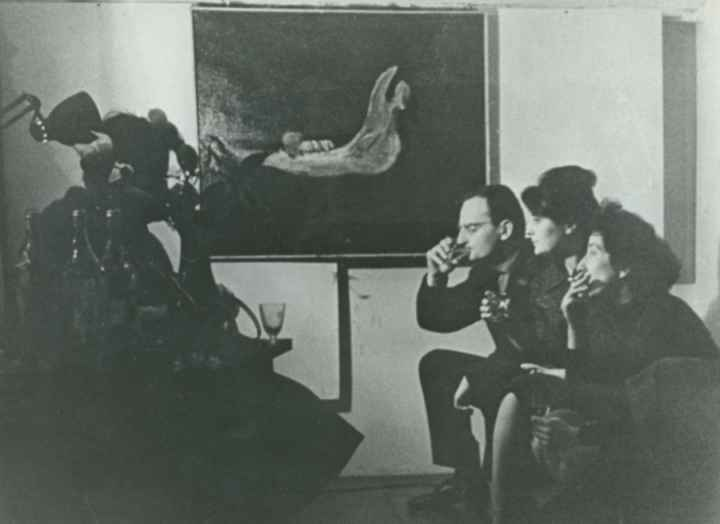
Solo exhibition in Krzysztofiak's studio in Smolna Street, April 1960 (S. Mrożek, M. Obremba-Mrożek, K. Brzechwa).

After leaving the Academy, Krzysztofiak went to Szklarska Poręba in the Karkonosze Mountains where he lived for four years, painting and working in various temporary positions not connected with art. In 1953, he joined other artists in Group ST-53. It was seen as a symbol of the artist's rebellion in the post-Stalin era, a sign of the newly organized avant-garde. The main purpose of the Group was self-education based on Władysław Strzemiński’s "Theory of Seeing". The first public exhibition of the Group opened on 13 May 1956 in the Silesian Institute in Stalinogród (Stalin City), now Katowice. In 1955, Krzysztofiak returned to Warsaw and stayed at a flat in Tarczyńska 11 with L. E. Stefański, who in there ran together with Miron Białoszewski the famous Theatre at Tarczyńska. In July–September 1955, he took part in the legendary National Exhibition of Young Artists under the banner: “Against War, against Fascism”, organized in the building of Warsaw Arsenal. Krzysztofiak proposed three works and one was accepted: "Still Life", later known as "The Jaw". At the end of 1955, he started working as a graphic editor for Po prostu where he worked until the magazine was shut down in 1957. On 27 July 1956, Krzysztofiak's first individual exhibition opened in the Warsaw discussion club Po prostu. In 1957, Krzysztofiak made a design for the Station of the Passion for the church in Nowa Huta but it was never realized.

At the end of 1958, Krzysztofiak met his future wife, Krystyna Miłotworska, a journalist and later editor with Radio Free Europe. At the beginning of 1960, he became graphic editor of the biweekly Ruch Muzyczny and designed the magazine's covers. He designed decorations for three one-act plays directed by Krystyna Meissner within her director's workshop; the first night was 21 June 1961, in Ateneum Theatre in Warsaw. The plays were Michel de Ghelderode’s Escurial, Harold Pinter’s The Dumb Waiter and Sławomir Mrożek’s At Sea. In September 1963, Krzysztofiak took part in the First International Koszalin Open Air Workshop organized in Poland for the first time. In 1964, he worked for theatres in Opole and Białystok designing decorations for plays directed by L. E. Stefański and K. Meissner. In that time he painted the series of sixteen pictures called "Białystok Totems". In August 1965, together with 39 artists from Poland and abroad, Krzysztofiak took part in the First Biennial of Space Forms in Elbląg. The metal space forms made during the biennial were situated in the town.

== Abroad ==
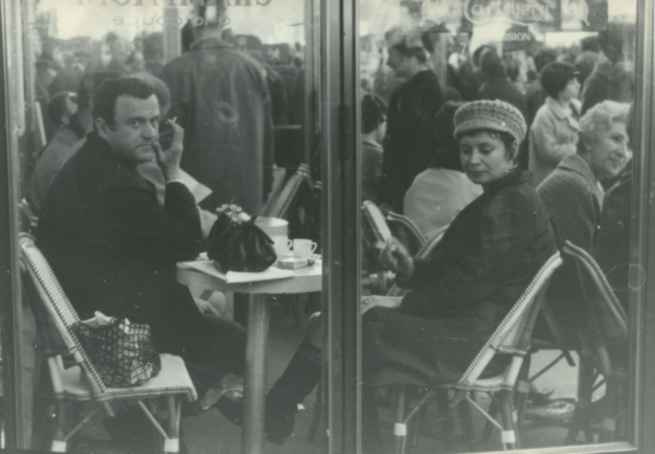
Hilary with wife, Krystyna Miłotworska in Paris, October 1967

Krzysztofiak first went abroad to Paris in 1966. There he made contacts with Polish emigrants, among them artists and writers such as Sławomir Mrożek and his wife Maria Obremba (a painter), Zbigniew Herbert, Jan Lebenstein, as well as with the Literary Institute “Kultura”. During his stay in France, he exhibited his works in Paris at the Galerie Desbrières and in Marseilles at the Galerie Jouvens. In May 1968, Krzysztofiak went to the Netherlands to prepare an exhibition in Galerie De Graaf in Schiedam where he presented unknown pictures sent from Poland by his wife. He then moved to Cologne where his wife joined him in December. In 1969, Krzysztofiak exhibited his paintings and worked as a stage designer; among others he made decorations for Mrożek's play The Turkey which had its first night on 10 May 1969 in the theatre in Düsseldorf. That summer, together with his wife who had found work for Radio Free Europe, they moved to Munich. After the first radio programme presented by Krystyna Miłotworska, the authorities in Warsaw decided to enter and liquidate Hilary's studio in Warsaw. Everything, including all the paintings apart from three works found many years later, was destroyed. Paintings were thrown into rubbish bins and works on paper were used for fire in roof repairs.

In spring 1971, Krzysztofiak went for the first time to the United States where he applied for American citizenship, which he was granted in 1977. He changed his name to Christopher Hilary. His first American exhibition took place a year later in South Orange, New Jersey. From the beginning of the 1970s, the artist continued his artistic creativity in Germany and the USA. He took part in many collective exhibitions and had several individual ones. In 1976, he was awarded the New York Alfred Jurzykowski Prize. He died suddenly in 1979, in Falls Church near Washington when he was 53.

== Recognition ==
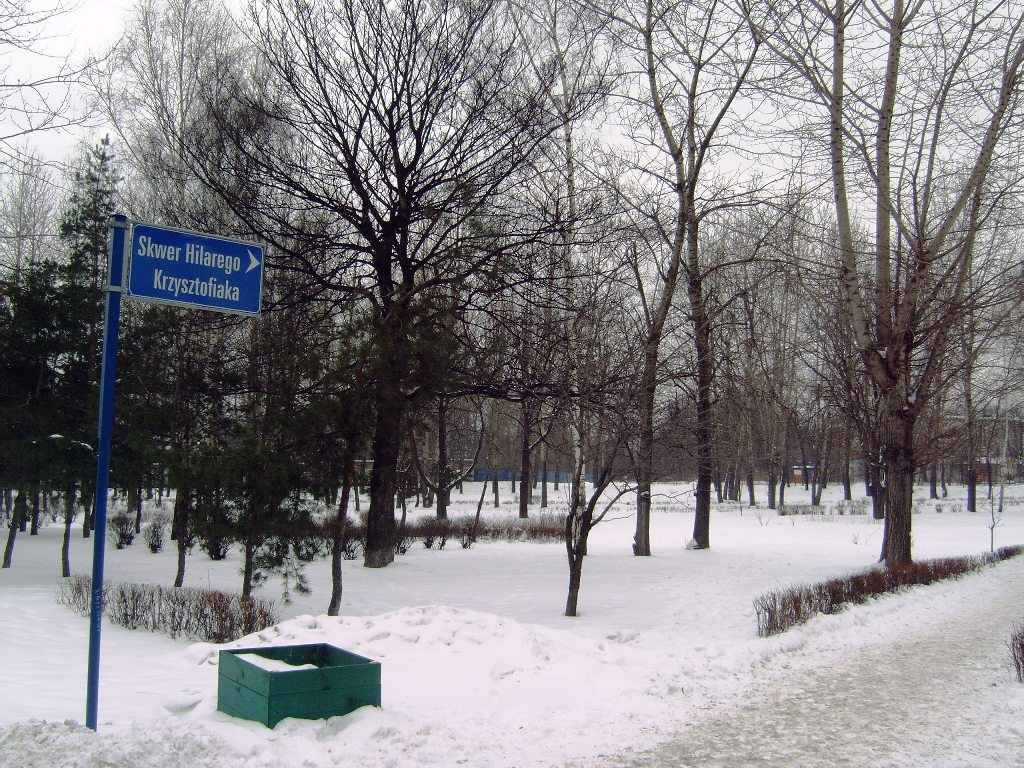
Katowice, Hilary Krzysztofiak Square

In the Polish People's Republic, Hilary was sentenced to non-existence. To bring back his person to the history of post-war Polish art National Museum in Warsaw organized a retrospective exhibition in the Zachęta Gallery in March 1997. The exhibition was also presented in the Silesian Museum in Katowice, in the Bunkier Sztuki Gallery in Kraków and in the Museum of Silesian Piasts in Brzeg.

At the beginning of 2009, in Katowice, the square at General Haller's Street and Westerplatte Defenders Street was given the name of Hilary Krzysztofiak. In October 2010, Kazimierz Kutz uncovered a memorial plate on the house where Krzysztofiak was born.

Krzysztofiak's paintings are in museums and private collections in Europe and in the USA.

== Selected exhibitions ==
Solo exhibitions

- 1956: Warsaw, "Po prostu" Discussion Salon
- 1963, 1965: Warsaw, "Krzywe Koło" Gallery
- 1966: Paris, Galerie Debrères
- 1968: Schiedam (Holandia), Galerij Simone de Graaf
- 1969: Düsseldorf, Galerie Hekuba
- 1972: South Orange (New Jersey, USA), Seton Hall University Student Art Gallery
- 1978: Cambridge (USA), BAAK Gallery
- 1979: Waszyngton, Franz Bader Gallery
- 1982: Paris, Galerie Lambert
- 1991: Warsaw, Galeria Kordegarda
- 1995: Regensburg (Germany), Löschenkohl-Palais
- 1997: Warsaw, Zachęta (retrospective)

Group exhibitions

- 1955: Warsaw, "Against War, against Fascism", Warsaw Arsenal
- 1956/1957: Warsaw, "Krzywe Koło" Gallery – exhibition of Group St-53
- 1959: Warsaw, Zachęta Gallery, 3rd Exhibition of Modern Art
- 1961/1962: Warsaw, National Museum – "Polish Fine Arts during the Fifteen Years of Polish People’s Republic"
- 1967: Paris, Galerie Lambert
- 1972: Munich, Galerie Christoph Dürr
- 1978: Washington, Franz Bader Gallery – "New Faces 1978"
- 1992: Warsaw, Zachęta Gallery – "The Circle of the Arsenal"

== Selected bibliography ==
- Hilary (Hilary Krzysztofiak 1926–1979). Malarstwo i rysunek, [monografia], oprac. H. Kotkowska-Bareja, E. Zawistowska, Warszawa 1997
- A. Grodzicki, Theatre in Modern Poland, Warszawa 1963
- Wielka encyklopedia malarstwa polskiego, preface by J. K. Ostrowski, ed. by A. Górska, Kraków 2011
- J. Czapski, Przez morze przepłynął, Kultura 1980 nr 1–2(388–389)
- H. Krzysztofiak, Nieukończona autobiografia, Zapis 1981 nr 20
- B. Stanisławczyk, Po prostu nikt, Gazeta Wyborcza, 9.10.1991
- J. Zieliński, Hilary: obraz albo świat cały, Odra 1992 nr 5

== Films about Hilary ==
- Hilary Krzysztofiak, S. Kubiak (film director), Polish Television 1993
- Niedokończony autoportret, U. Dubowska (film director), Polish Television 1998
- Hilary z budki Kanolda, S. Kubiak (film director), Polish Television 2001
