= Thomas Pradzynski =

Polish painter

Thomas Pradzynski (29 November 1951 – 21 December 2007) was a Polish painter. Born in Łódź in 1951, he attended the Lycée Français in Warsaw, where he received a master's degree in sociology and economics.

He and his wife, Joanna, moved to Paris in 1977, where he became known for his realistic Parisian street scenes. At the time of his death, he lived in Montmartre. He was murdered in December 2007 in a road rage incident while he was walking with his wife in Paris.

Pradzynski's work has been showcased at exhibitions around the world, including New York City, Germany, Japan, and California.

== Other reading ==
- Thomas Pradzynski biography from the Doubletake Gallery
