= Leszek Nowosielski (footballer) =

Polish footballer

Personal information
- Full name: Leszek Nowosielski
- Date of birth: 26 February 1992 (age 34)
- Place of birth: Opole, Poland
- Height: 1.82 m (6 ft 0 in)
- Position: Midfielder

Team information
- Current team: LZS Starościn

Youth career
- 1999–2005: Rodło Opole
- 2005–2008: Odra Opole
- 2008–2010: Promień Opalenica

Senior career*
Years	Team	Apps	(Gls)
2009	Promień Opalenica	9	(0)
2010–2011	Ruch Zdzieszowice	26	(3)
2011–2014	GKS Bełchatów	10	(1)
2013	→ Warta Poznań (loan)	7	(0)
2014	→ MKS Kluczbork (loan)	11	(1)
2014–2015	Montrose	1	(0)
2015–2018	Turriff United	68	(6)
2018–2019	Deveronvale		
2019	Ruch Zdzieszowice	9	(0)
2019–2026	LZS Starowice Dolne	170	(26)
2026–	LZS Starościn	0	(0)

International career
2010	Poland U18	2	(0)
2011	Poland U19	1	(0)
2011	Poland U20	4	(0)
- * Club domestic league appearances and goals as of 11:14, 4 February 2026 (UTC)

Leszek Nowosielski (born 26 February 1992) is a Polish professional footballer who plays as a midfielder for IV liga Opole club LZS Starościn. Besides Poland, he has played in Scotland.

== Club career ==
In July 2011, Nowosielski joined GKS Bełchatów on a three-year contract.

On 14 November 2014, Nowosielski agreed to a short-term contract with Scottish League Two club Montrose until January 2015, however due to delays in receiving international clearance he didn't make his debut for the club until 6 December 2014.

On 31 January 2015, Nowosielski made his debut for Turriff United coming on as a substitute for the final 15 minutes of a 3–0 win over Huntly in the Highland Football League. He made his first start for the club on 7 February, this time in the Highland League Cup, Turriff won the match 4–1 to progress to the quarter-finals.

== International career ==
Nowosielski was a part of Poland national under-20 team.

== Honours ==
LZS Starowice Dolne

- IV liga Opole: 2022–23, 2024–25
