= Tadeusz Myslowski =

Polish painter, printmaker and photographer

Tadeusz Mysłowski
- Born: Tadeusz Mysłowski; 7 May 1943 (age 83); Piotrków Pierwszy
- Known for: Painting, printmaker, photographer

Tadeusz Mysłowski (born 7 May 1943) is a Polish painter, printmaker and photographer.

== Individual exhibitions and activities ==
- New York City, Belgrade, Paris, Lisbon, Kraków, Lublin, Wrocław.
- Louvre in Paris
- Museum of Modern Art (MoMA) in New York City
- Victoria and Albert Museum in London
- In 1995, in Warsaw, Tadeusz Mysłowski presented his exhibition Endless Columns.
- In 1999 together with Zbigniew Bargielskim Shirne realized – a multimedia installation at Majdanek in Lublin
- One of the exhibitions (at the Galerie Renos Xippas in Paris) in February 1996, has been used in the movie advertising company IBM.
- The work of Tadeusz Myslowski are in the National Museum in Warsaw.
