= Władysław Wankie =

Polish painter and art critic

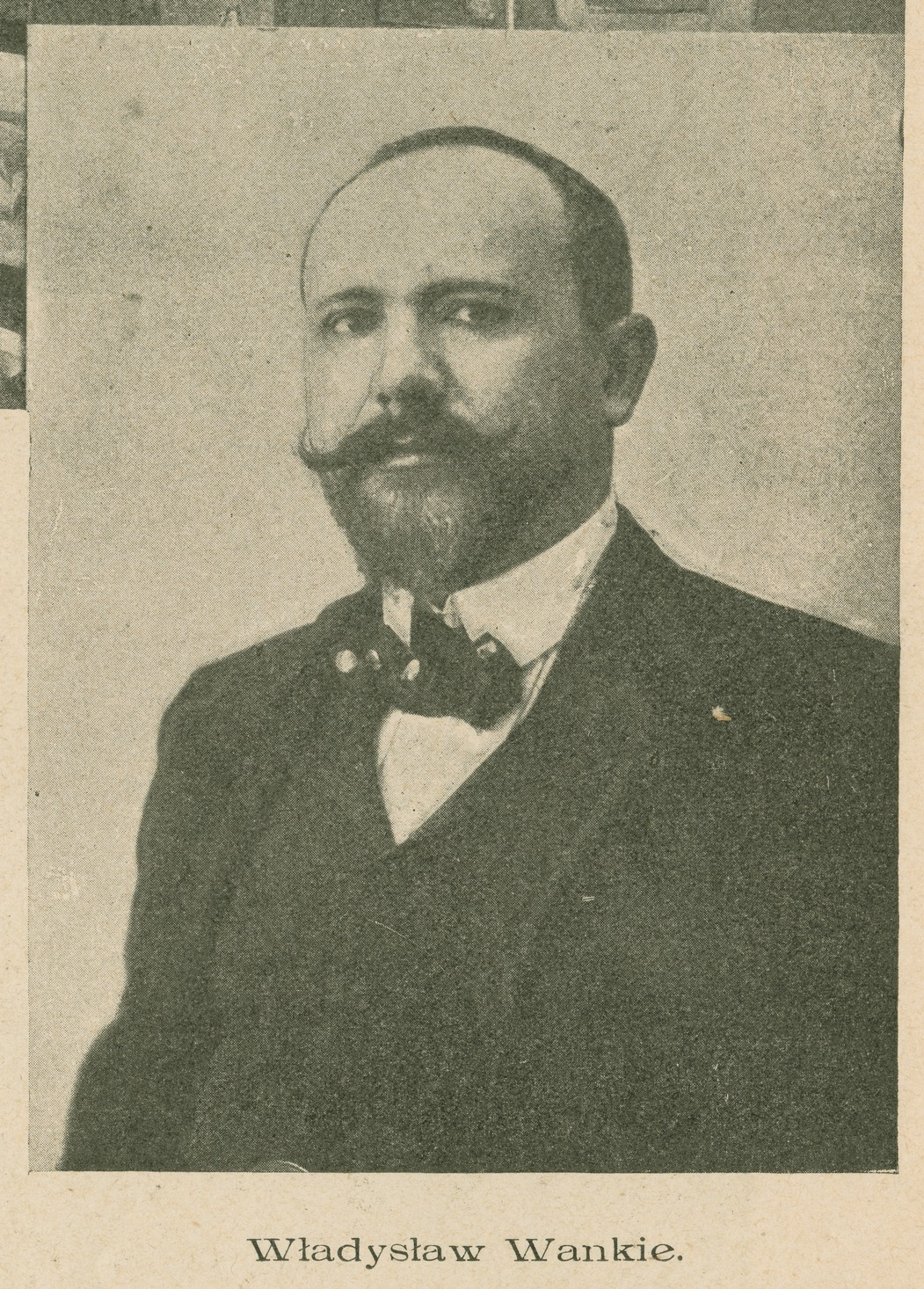
- Born: 1860; Warsaw, Poland
- Died: 1925 (aged 64–65); Warsaw, Poland
- Education: Jan Matejko Academy of Fine Arts in Kraków
- Known for: Painting
- Movement: Realism, Symbolism

Władysław Wankie (born 1860 in Warsaw, died 1925 therein) was a Polish painter and art critic. He painted realist landscape paintings, genre scenes, religious art and symbolic art. He was the co-author of the Panorama of the Tatra Mountains (Panorama Tatr).

Wankie studied art between 1875 and 1880, when he was taught by Wojciech Gerson, followed shortly after at the Jan Matejko Academy of Fine Arts in Kraków, where he was taught by Władysław Łuszczkiewicz and Jan Matejko. However, he did not accept the dominating academic art at the institution and, in 1882, he moved to Munich, where he lived for twenty years. While studying in Munich he became closely associated with a number of Polish artists who revolved around Józef Brandt. He remained in close contact with artists in Poland, where he exhibited his artwork inter alia in Warsaw at the Zachęta National Gallery of Art, and he co-operated with Polish journals.

In 1903, he returned to Poland, and lived in Warsaw. In 1905, he became a member of the Society of the Incentive for Fine Arts (Towarzystwo Zachęty Sztuk Pięknych). From 1906 to 1924, he edited for the art journal "Świat" and co-operated with the Tygodnik Ilustracyjny and Kurier Warszawski journals. He was one of the founders and leaders of the conservative Society Pro Arte (Stowarzyszenie Pro Arte).

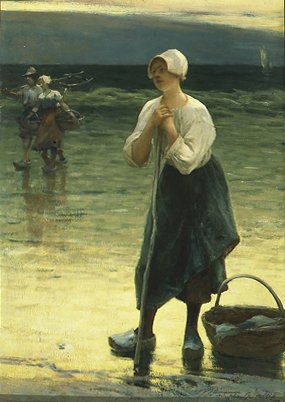
Breton fisherwoman
(1893)

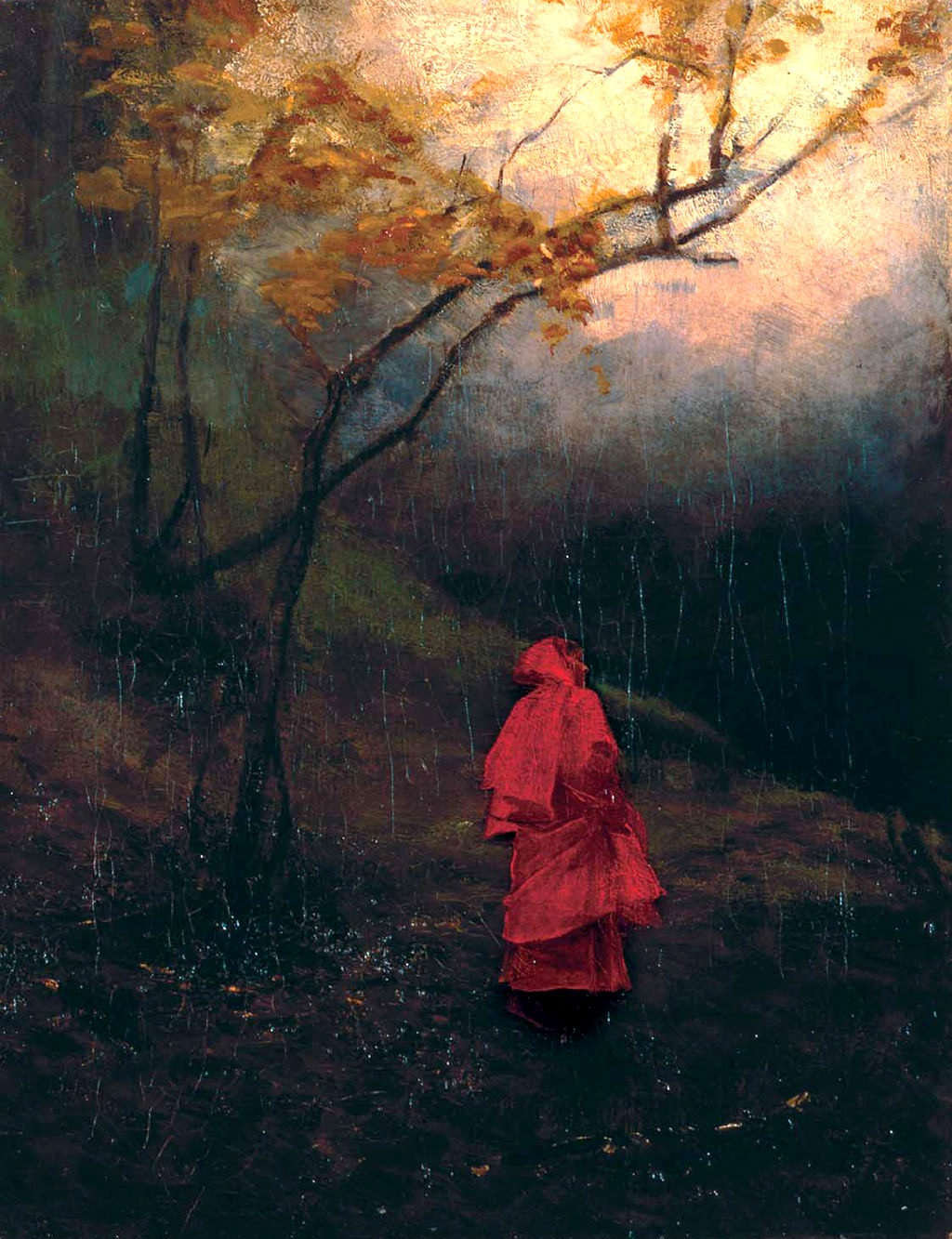
Alone in the park
(c. 1900)

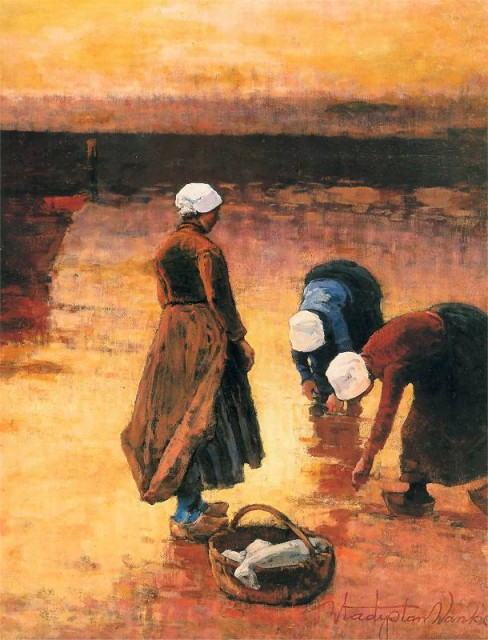
Women by the riverbank
(c. 1925)
