= Anna Ziaja =

Polish contemporary painter and print maker

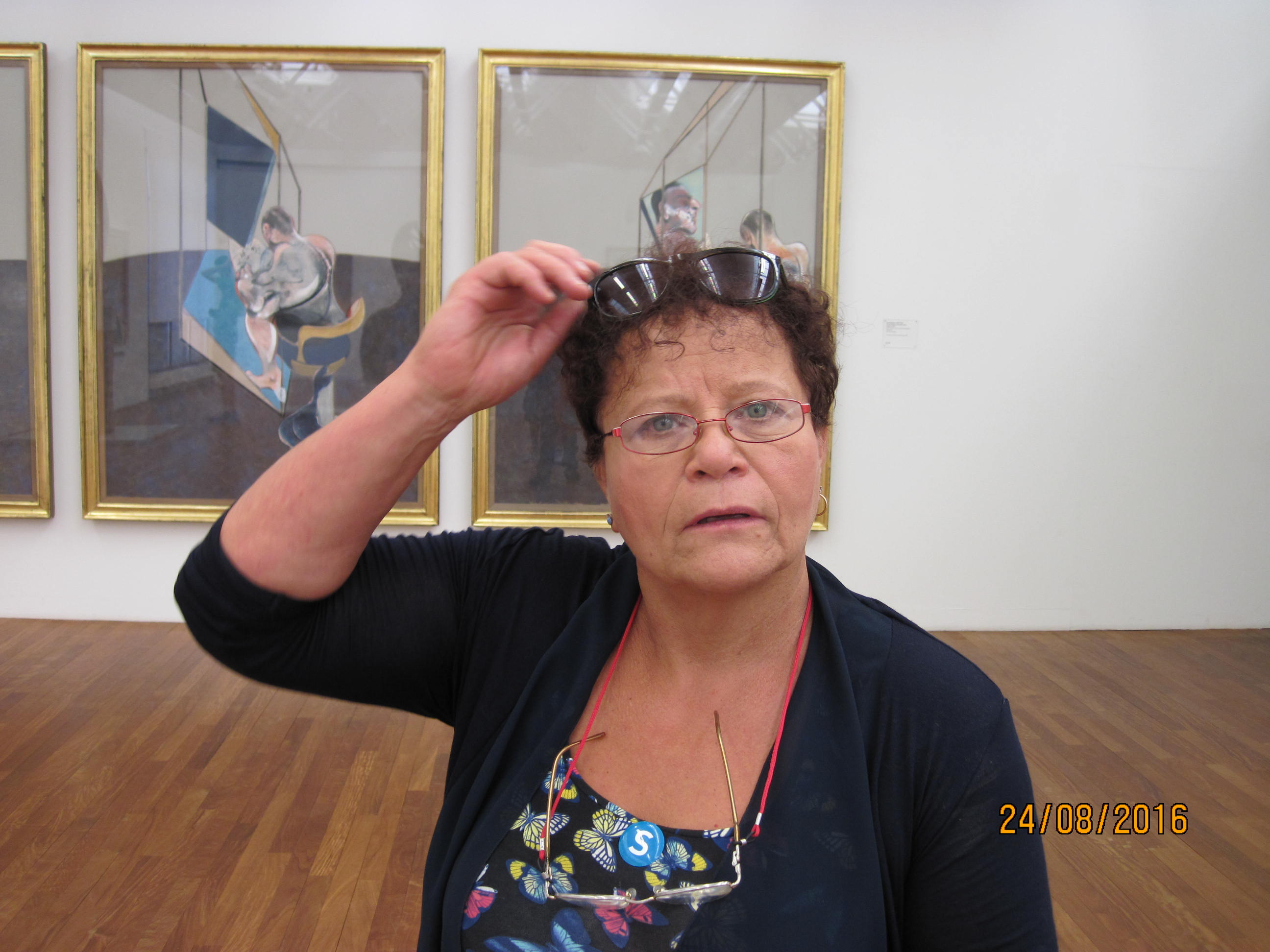
Anna Ziaja

Anna Ziaja (born August 1, 1954 in Wrocław) is a Polish contemporary painter and print maker.

== Biography ==
Ziaja was educated in the faculty of painting and graphic arts at the Academy of Fine Arts in Warsaw, and graduated with an honours degree in 1979.

Her unique vision of contemporary art comes from her love of Italian art from Trecento to Cinquecento, from Masaccio to Vittore Carpaccio fused with her Polish heritage and paintings of Zygmunt Waliszewski and Eugeniusz Zak. Her concepts are an expression of poetry and personal contemplation, from the melancholic to sometimes bitter reflection. Ziaja's paintings present a psychological abstract of human fate; a depiction of multifaceted personalities inexorable linked in everyday complexities, portraying the individualism of the world.

Ziaja lives in Warsaw Poland and Modena Italy.

== Exhibitions ==
Participated in exhibitions of Polish art:

- 1983 - "Młoda Polska graphics", Oerdinghausen, Germany
- 1985 - "Wystawa Środowiska Warszawskiego", Zachęta, Warsaw, Poland,
- 1986 - "4 polish artists in AF Galerie", Wiesbaden, Germany
- 1986 - "Polskie Malarstwo Współczesne" AF Galerie Wiesbaden, Germany,
- 1987 - "Sztuka jako wolność", BWA Koszalin, Poland,
- 1988 - "Nowe Malowanie" Instytut Polski, Praga, Czech Republic
- 1988 - "Wystawa Møodej Polskiej Plastyki Arsenał '88", Hala Gwardii, Warsaw, Poland,
- 1989 - A hundred colours, Dijkstra Galerie, Amsterdam, the Netherlands
- 1989 - "Biało-Czerwone" Hala Gwardii, Warsaw, Poland,
- 1990 - "5 Malarzy z Warszawy", Merz Contemporary Art, London, Great Britain
- 1990 - "RAJ" Fundacja Sztuki Współczesnej, Monetti gallery, Warsaw, Poland,
- 1990 - "Pologne '90", Hotel de Ville de Saints, Gille's, Bruxelles, Belgium
- 1990 - "Inter Art", Andrzeja Kareński gallery, Poznań, Poland,
- 1990 - "Art Fair", Hamburg, Germany
- 1990 - "Dziwny Świat", Monetti gallery, Warsaw
- 1990/91 - "The Expressive Struggle 28 Contemporary Polish Artists, Museum Academy of Fine Art. New York, Cleveland State University, Ohio, USA
- 1991 - "paintings Polskie", Polish Museum of America, Chicago, USA
- 1992 - "The Expressive Struggle", Andersen Gallery, Buffalo, New York, USA
- 2002 - Warszawski Przegląd Malarstwa, exhibition accompanying the Jan Cybis Award, DAP, Warsaw, Poland,
- 2004 - Fidusiewicz i przyjaciele, sport in art, Centrum Olimpijskie, Warsaw, Poland,
- 2007 - Sport in art, Fidusiewicz with friends, selected artists, Centrum Olimpijskie, Warsaw, Poland,
- 2008 - "Arsenał 20 years later..." winners of the exhibition Arsenał'88, Centrum Olimpijskie, Warsaw, Poland,
- 2012 - "3 światy czyli 150 lat polskiej sztuki współczesnej", Zadra gallery, Warsaw, Poland,

and individual exhibitions:

- 1979 - paintings and graphics, Centro Culturale "L'indiscreto", Roma, Italy,
- 1979 - paintings and graphics, Centro Studi "L.A.Muratori", Modena, Italy,
- 1980 - paintings and graphics, "Nowy Świat 23" gallery, Warsaw, Poland,
- 1981 - paintings and graphics, "Nowy Świat" gallery, Warsaw, Poland,
- 1982 - graphics, Pontremoli, Italy,
- 1982 - graphics, Centro Studi "L.A. Muratori", Modena, Italy,
- 1982 - graphics, Como, Italy,
- 1989 - paintings, "test" gallery, Warsaw, Poland,
- 1990 - paintings, Brama gallery, Warsaw, Poland,
- 1990 - paintings, Katarzyna Baumann gallery, Fryburg, Switzerland,
- 1991 - paintings, "Mexpol Galerie", Düsseldorf, Germany,
- 1992 - paintings, Brama gallery, Warsaw, Poland,
- 1992 - paintings, BWA, Ciechanów, Poland,
- 1993 - paintings, Ostrołęka gallery, Ostrołęka, Poland,
- 1993 - paintings, Francisca gallery, Arhus, Denmark,
- 1994 - paintings, "Pod Atlantami" gallery, Walbrzych, Poland,
- 1995 - paintings, BWA, Jelenia Góra, Poland,
- 1995 - paintings, BWA, Zamość, Poland,
- 1998 - paintings, Brama gallery, Warsaw, Poland,
- 2008 - paintings, "-1" gallery, Centrum Olimpijskie, Warsaw, Poland,
- 2008 - paintings, Atrium gallery, Akademia Leona Koźminskiego, Warsaw, Poland,
- 2012 - paintings, "Trzy Swiaty - Brodowska, Jampolski, Ziaja", Zadra gallery, Warsaw, Poland.

== Sources ==
- Teresa Hrankowska, 1994: Sztuka a erotyka Materiały Sesji Stowarzyszenia Historyków Sztuki, Ośrodek Wydawniczy Arx Regia, Warsaw. ISBN 83-902657-8-8
- Jarosław M. Daszkiewicz, 1995: Malarstwo Młodych, Wydawnictwa Artystyczne i Filmowe, Warsaw. ISBN 83-221-0662-9
- 2001: Słownik Malarzy Polskich Od dwudziestolecia międzywojennego do końca XX wieku, Wydawnictwo Arkady, Warsaw. ISBN 83-213-4143-8
- Kama Zboralska, 2004: Sztuka inwestowania w SZTUKĘ, Wydawnictwo Rosner & Wspólnicy, Warsaw. ISBN 83-89217-43-0
- 2011: Wielka Encyklopedia Malarstwa Polskiego, Wydawnictwo Kluszczyński, Kraków. ISBN 978-83-744711-8-3
- Polski Komitet Olimpijski, 2016: Galeria (-1) Wystawy Sztuki Współczesnej Polski Komitet Olimpijski 2006-2016, Polski Komitet Olimpijski, Warsaw ISBN 978-83-942901-2-2
