= Aleksander Kokular =

Polish painter (1793–1846)

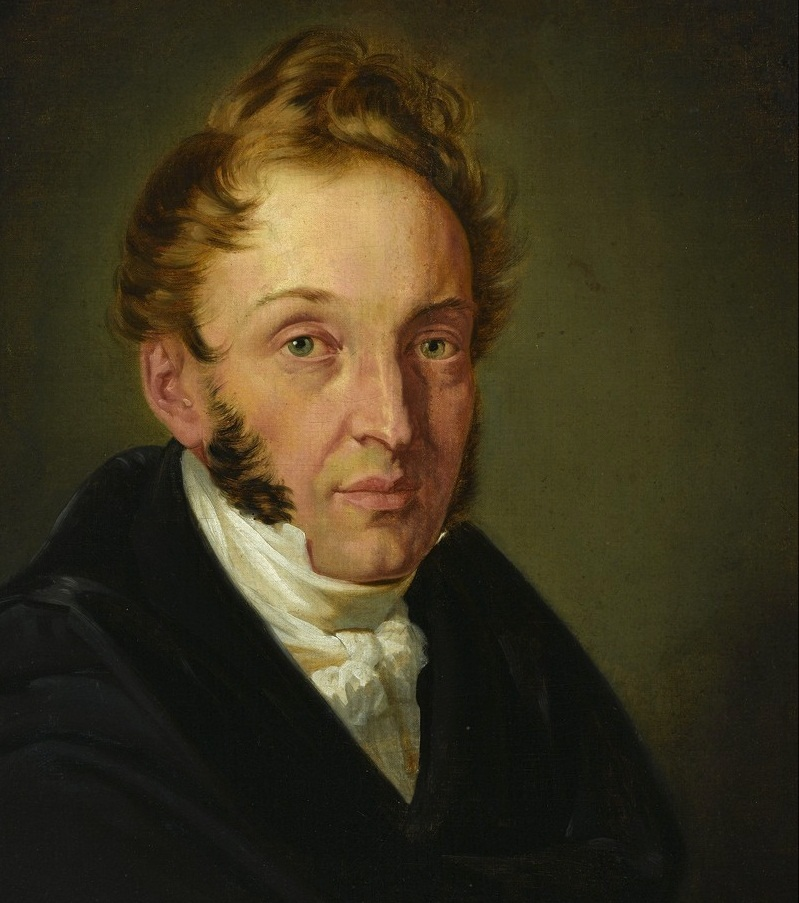
Self-portrait (cropped, date unknown)

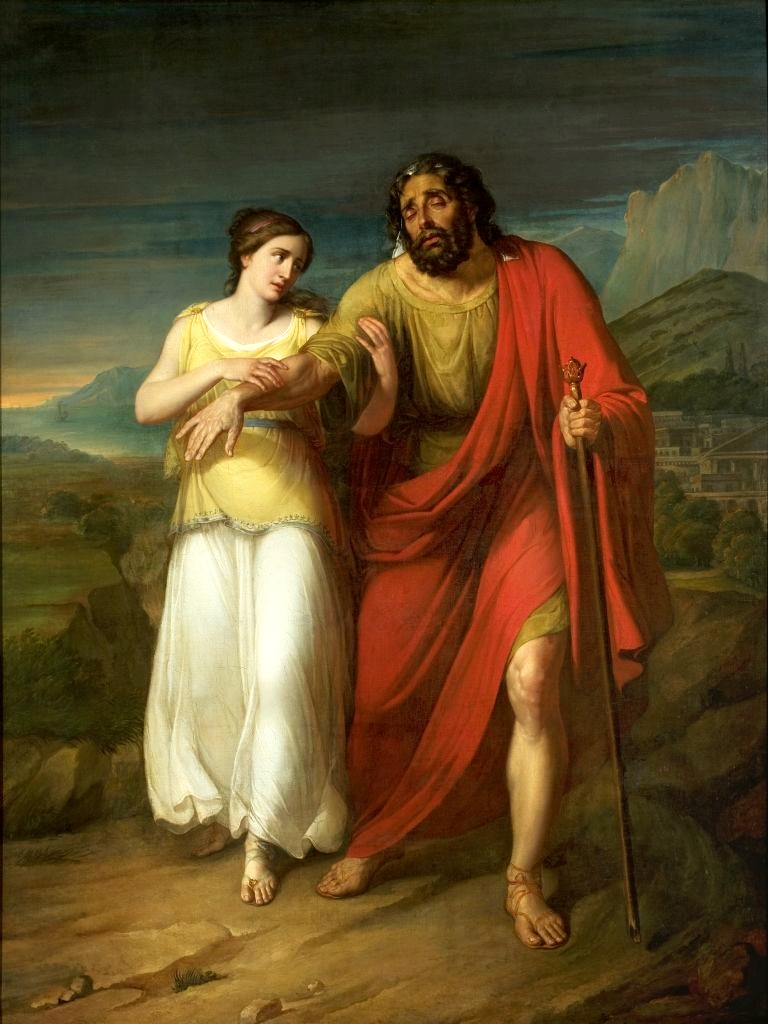
Oedipus and Antigone (1828)

Aleksander Kokular (9 August 1793 – 6 April 1846) was a Polish painter, art collector and teacher. He was one of the co-founders of the School of Fine Arts in Warsaw and a prominent Freemason. Portraits (contemporary and historical) and mythological scenes were his specialties.

== Biography ==
He was born in Warsaw to a merchant family and first studied painting at the Warsaw Lyceum under the supervision of Zygmunt Vogel. In 1814, he enrolled at the Academy of Fine Arts, Vienna, where he studied with Johann Baptist von Lampi the Elder, then spent a year at the Accademia di San Luca in Rome. He returned to Warsaw in 1818 and became a teacher.

For a year, he taught calligraphy at a piarist boarding school, then became a teacher at the Warsaw Lyceum in 1821. He went back to Rome on a government scholarship from 1824 to 1826, where he came under the influence of Vincenzo Camuccini. After his return, he remained at the Lyceum until it was closed by the Russian government in 1831.

From 1835 to 1841, he operated a private art school from his home and, from 1838 to 1840, was a lecturer at the "Alexandria Institute for Young Ladies". Then, from 1841 to 1844, he was a teacher at the newly established Royal Gymnasium.

In 1844, he joined with Jan Feliks Piwarski to establish the "School of Fine Arts" and taught there until his death, two years later. Cyprian Kamil Norwid was his best-known pupil. The school was closed in 1864, because its students had participated in the January Uprising. It was reopened in 1904 and, since 1932, has been known as the Academy of Fine Arts in Warsaw.

Among his most familiar contemporary portraits are those of Tsar Nicholas I, Count Ivan Paskevich, Count Aleksander Stanisław Potocki and the composer, Maria Szymanowska. Among his historical portraits, one depicting the marriage of Jadwiga and Władysław II Jagiełło is notable. He also did church paintings in Siedlce, Suwałki, Puławy and Brześć. His collection consisted mostly of contemporary works, although he restored and sold antique paintings from the collection of Count Potocki.
