= Benon Liberski =

Polish painter and graphic artist

Benon Liberski (3 May 1926 – 15 April 1983) was a Polish painter and graphic artist.

== Biography ==
Benon Liberski was born on 3 May 1926 in Łódź (Lodz) in Poland. In 1948–1951 he studied at the State Art School in Łódź and in 1951–1954 continued at Faculty of Graphic Propaganda in Katowice. He obtained a degree in Academy of Fine Arts in Kraków at the Faculty of Graphic Propaganda in Katowice (1954). Starting in 1951 he presents his works (oil painting and graphics) at national and regional painting and graphics exhibitions in Poland and abroad. He was a member of the Association of the Polish Artists. In the period 1972–1982 he worked in Academy of Fine Arts in Łódź as a lecturer, professor and pro-rector. He was also a president of the branch of Association of the Polish Artists in Łódź (Lodz) in 1965–1972.

== Style ==
Liberski as an artist belonged to the 'realism school' in paintings. He made cycles of paintings and graphics: "Westerns", "Dispatchers", "Acts", "Industry landscapes”. His style has elements of comic (cartoon), pop-art. All works are very expressive.
