= Stefan Filipkiewicz =

Polish artist (1879–1944)

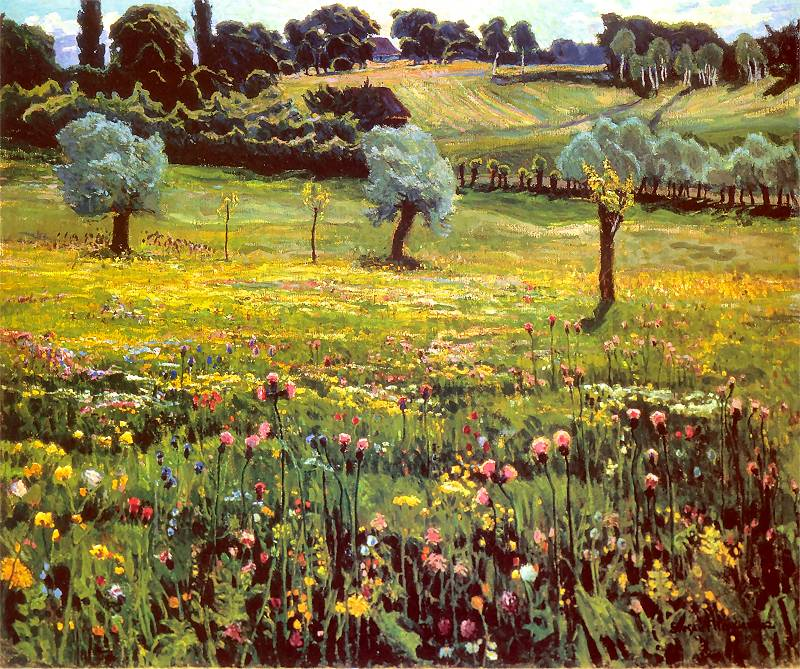
Meadow, 1904

Stefan Filipkiewicz in his studio (1936)

Stefan Filipkiewicz (pronounced [ˈstɛfan filipˈkʲɛvit͡ʂ]; 28 July 1879 – 23 August 1944) was a Polish painter and designer. He was born in Tarnów, Austria-Hungary, and died in Mauthausen-Gusen concentration camp, Nazi Germany, during the Holocaust. Notable for his landscapes inspired by the Young Poland movement, he was a leading representative of the Polish Art Nouveau style of painting.

His landscapes of the Tatra Mountains and the region of Podhale were first exhibited in Kraków in 1899 at the Palace of Art run by the Kraków Society of Friends of Fine Art. Between 1900 and 1908 Filipkiewicz studied at the Academy of Fine Arts in Kraków under Józef Mehoffer, Leon Wyczółkowski, Jan Stanisławski and Józef Pankiewicz.

In 1908, Filipkiewicz joined the Society of Polish Artists. He became the contributing artist to the legendary Zielony Balonik art-and-literary cabaret. In 1929, Filipkiewicz was awarded the Golden Medal of the Universal Exhibition in Poznań. Four years later, he was also awarded by the Polish Academy of Skills for his works. During the 1939 Invasion of Poland he fled to Hungary, where he became an active member of several underground organizations. Arrested by the Gestapo, he was sent to the Mauthausen-Gusen concentration camp where he was murdered as a victim of the Holocaust.
