= Leszek Nowosielski (painter) =

Polish painter

Leszek Nowosielski (15 November 1918, in Warsaw – 1999) was a Polish artist who worked in conjunction with his wife, Hanna Modrzewska-Nowosielska. They lived in Podkowa Leśna, Poland.

Alongside the graphic arts and easel painting they began to work on porcelain, using "on-glaze painting" to create dinner table sets, vases, plates and other ceramics. Nowosielski created works with historical and architectural motifs. The works were sought after by private collectors, as well as government institutions as gifts for overseas recipients such as General de Gaulle during his visit to Poland. His subject matters ranged from mythology, glazed allegories, monumental figurative compositions, abstract friezes, as well as themes of destruction and suffering like Hiroshima, Auschwitz and Katyn.

Apart from ceramics and porcelain, Nowosielski painted landscapes, still lifes, abstracts and popular scenes from everyday life. Towards the end of his life, his painting technique adopted plasticity and an almost three-dimensional character of ceramic material, somehow translating the language of ceramics into oil and acrylic mediums. Through the application of paint, his canvasses reflected light-shadow effects that were unique to three-dimensional ceramics. Ceramics and painting interacted in his art, substituting one for the other.

Nowosielski’s body of work shows a vast variety of output: porcelain, oil and acrylic painting, drawings and abstract forms. Leszek Nowosielski and Hanna Modrzewska-Nowosielska won many prizes and awards, and their works are in many museums and private collections in Poland and overseas. A large ceramic composition depicting Hiroshima is considered as one of the most important works in the center of remembrance in Hiroshima.
