= Traditional Ukrainian wedding =

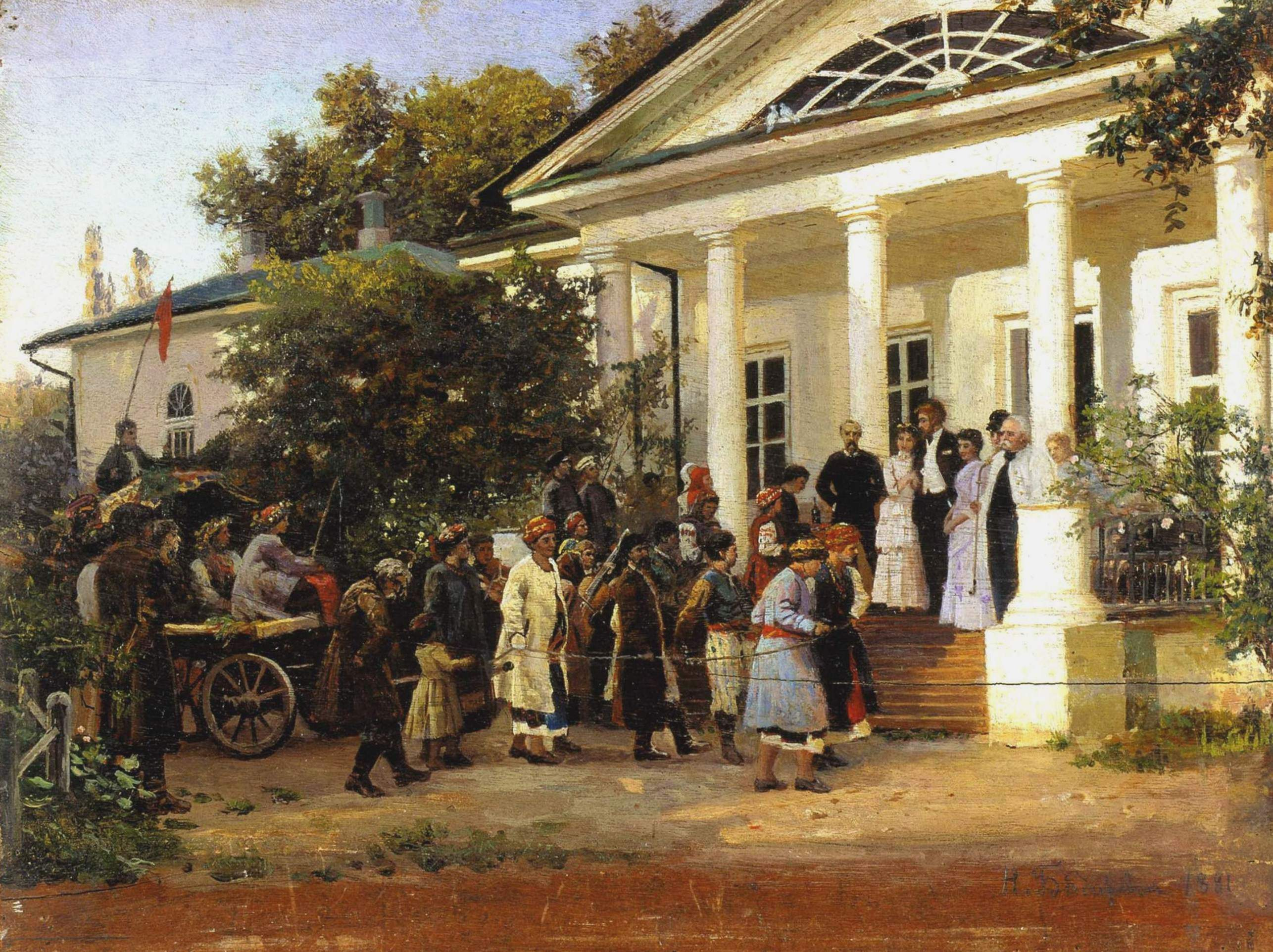
Mykola Bondarevskyy "Wedding"

Traditional Ukrainian wedding (Ukrainian: весілля, romanized: vesill'a, Ukrainian pronunciation: [ʋeˈsʲilʲːɐ]) is a wedding in Ukrainian folk everyday life – a complex mixture of rites of different days, in which elements of the ancestral exothermic era, Greek-Byzantine religious-mystical influences and newer Ukrainian ones are distinguished.

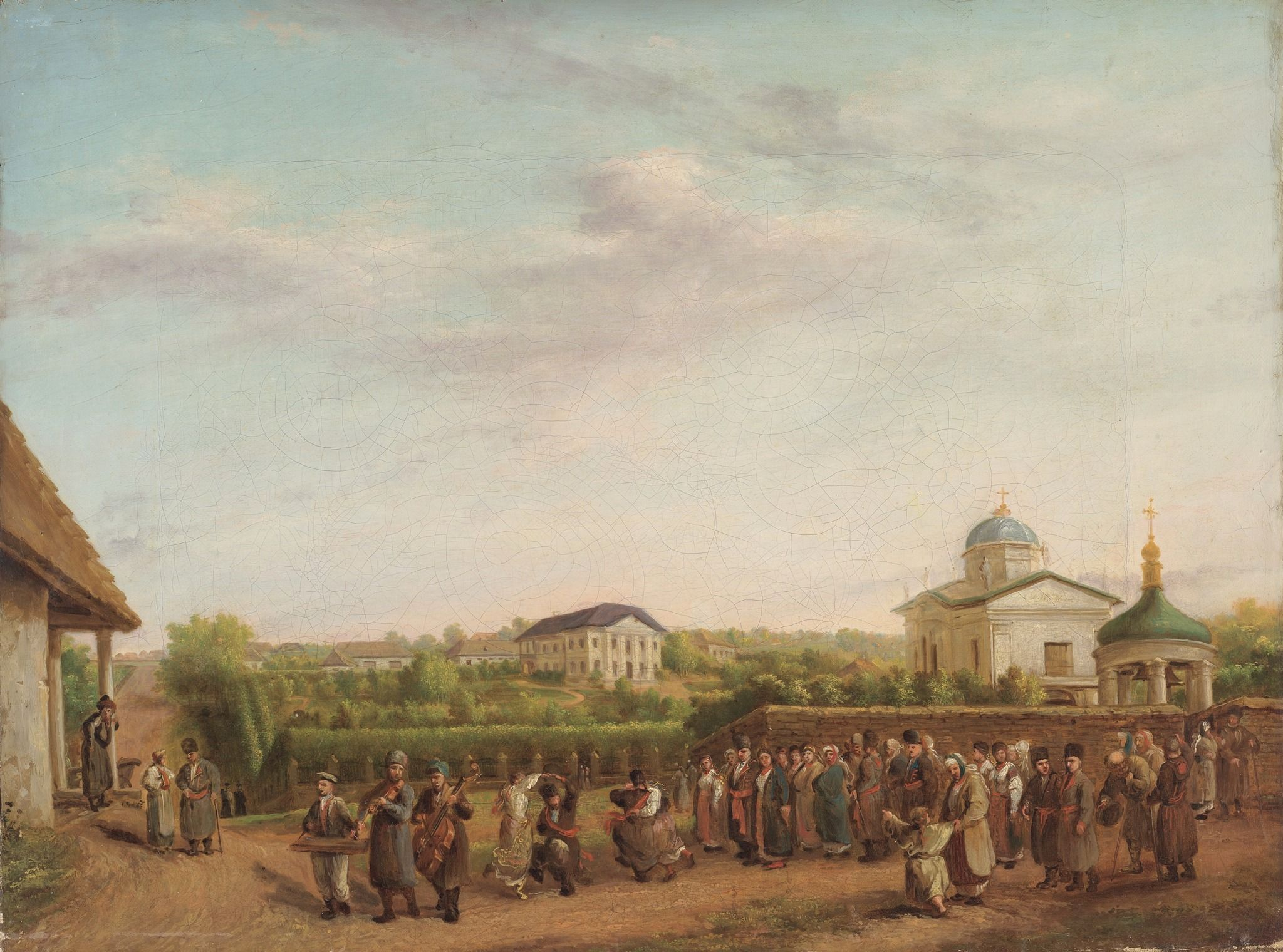
V. Tropinin "Wedding in Kukavka in Podillia"

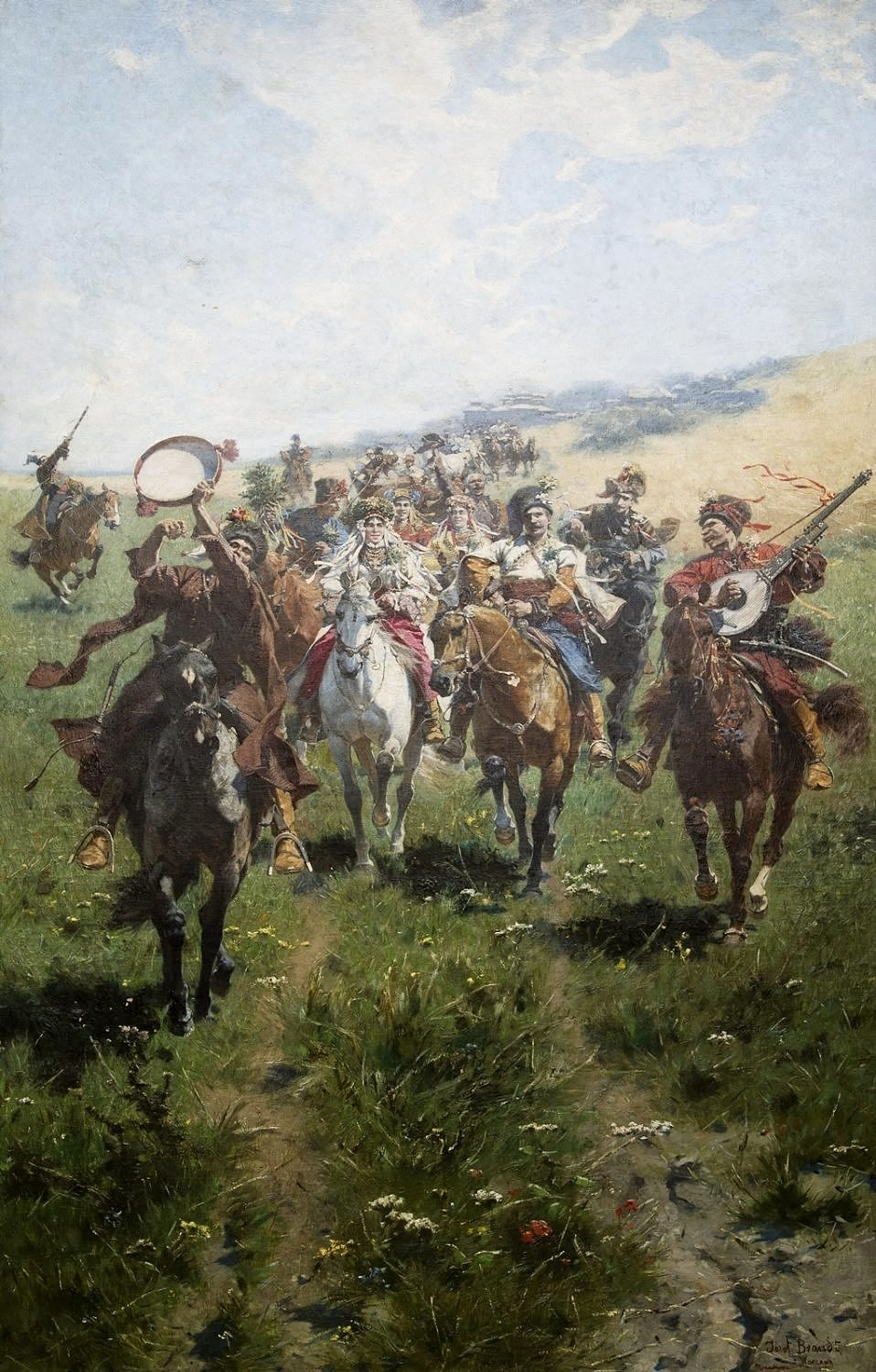
Józef Brandt "Wedding of cossacks"

The wedding rite in the system of family rites, as a component of the spiritual culture of Ukrainians, is one of the most ancient and complex. A wedding, as the name indicates, is a joyful and cheerful rite of marriage of young people.

A traditional Ukrainian wedding includes three mandatory cycles: pre-wedding, wedding and post-wedding, each of which consists of separate ceremonies.

Pre-wedding cycle:

- matchmaking
- umovyny / ohliadyny – acquaintance with the groom's household, which took place shortly after a successful matchmaking
- engagement

Wedding cycle:

- bachelorette party
- baking shyshky
- baking a korovai
- «Posad» of the newlyweds – the place at the table where the bride and groom sit during the wedding
- giving gifts
- braiding and covering the bride
- transportation of the dowry
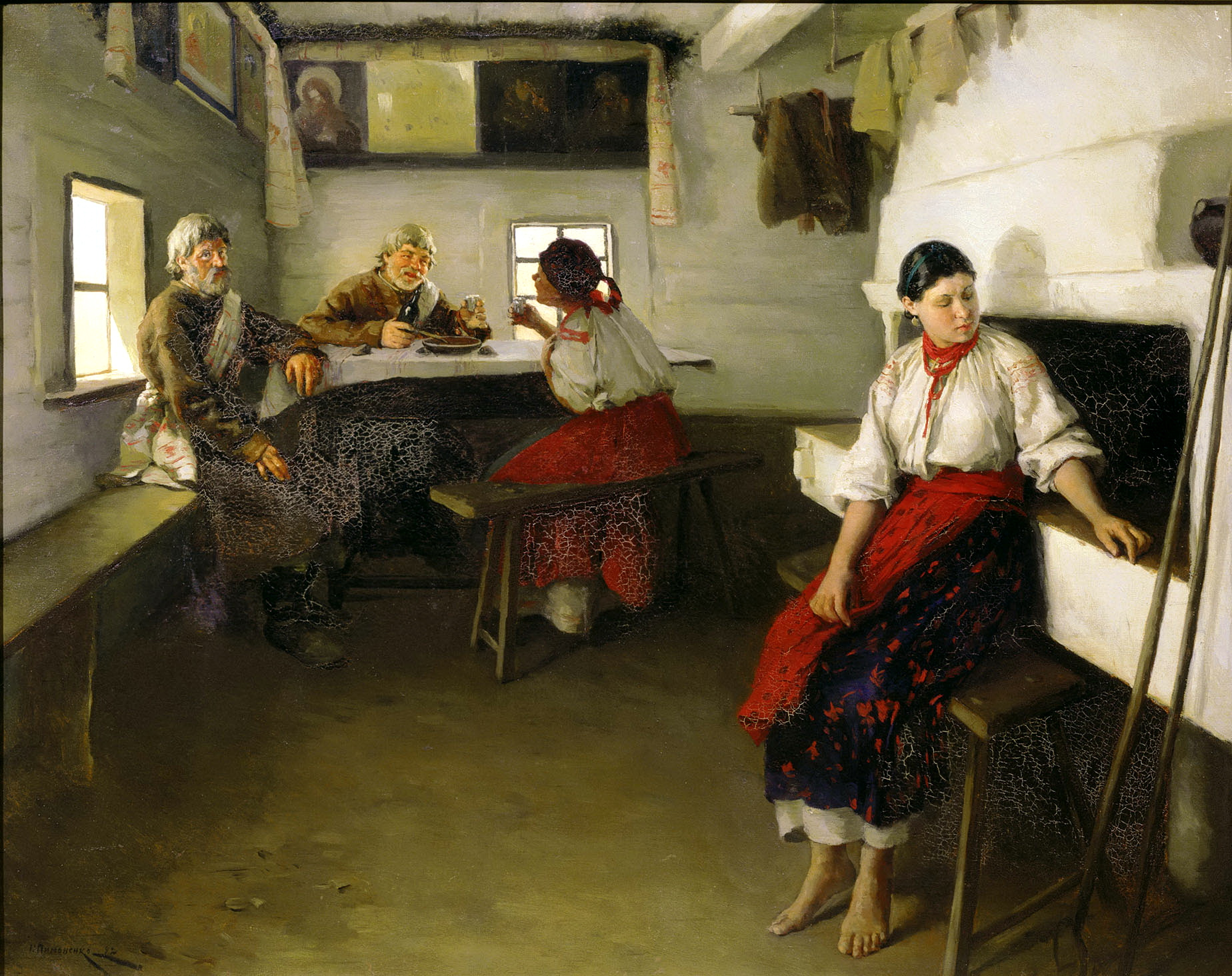
  Mykola Pymonenko "In-Laws"

Post-wedding cycle:

- feast.

== Zmovyny ==
At first there were zmovyny, on which a marriage contract was signed, which was recorded in government books and signed by witnesses and newlyweds. Simple people did not write conditions in the government books, but agreed in the presence of witnesses. Relatives and friends were invited to zmovyny. Besides this, posah (dowry), vino (bride price), and pryvinok (gifts) were also negotiated. «Posah» was called things that parents gave to a girl: money, gold and silver jewelry, necklaces, silver, copper, zinc untensils, clothes, horses, servants. If the bride had no brothers, she was also given land and in case the land belonged to the mother, it did not go to the sons, but to the daughters. The groom wrote down the vino and pryvinok. The custom of giving vino (bride price) has been going on since knyaz’ times (Kniaz’ – a historical Slavic title, used both as a royal and noble title in different times of history and different ancient Slavic lands), but it was first given as a ransom, and later it was written down to the bride herself. The posah, vino and pryvinok were written down in the «zmovyny letter». The letter also wrote down when the wedding was to take place. A monetary guarantee was also written in the letter, in case one of the parties does not comply with the conditions. Zmovyny letters were recorded in government act books. After marriage, the wife independently owned her vino, she also had the right to dispose of her own or acquired estates, that is, she had the right to sell, donate or pledge.

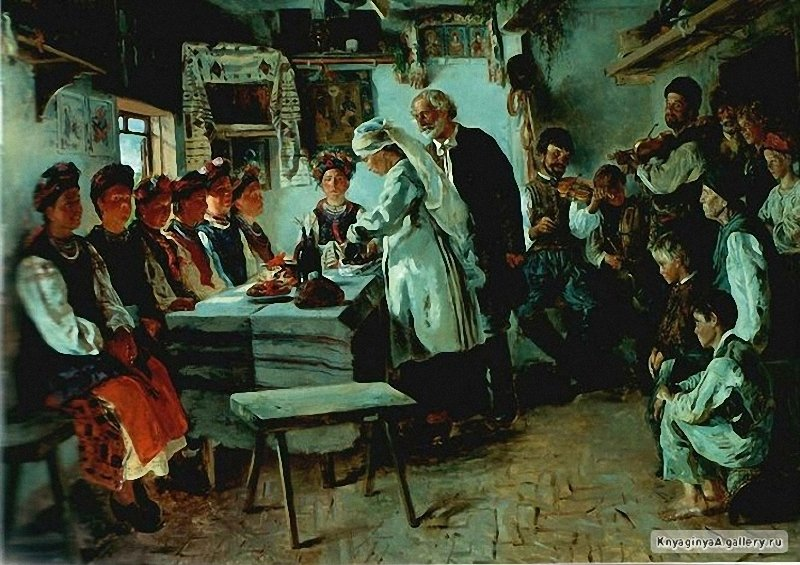
Volodymyr Makovskyy "A bachelorette party"

After zmovyny there was an engagement and after the engagement there was a wedding. After that, the couple was considered married.

== Matchmaking ==
First, the boy went to the bride's house together with the starosty (In Ukraine, mediators during matchmaking; as a rule, close relatives, respectable married men who were sociable and witty) with bread and delicious food. If the girl's parents agreed, they gave their blessing and the girl brought the wedding towel to the groom and tied the towel to the father-in-law and mother-in-law, and tucked the embroidered shawl behind the boy's belt. If the girl did not agree to get married, then instead of towels she brought out a pumpkin.

== Engagement ==
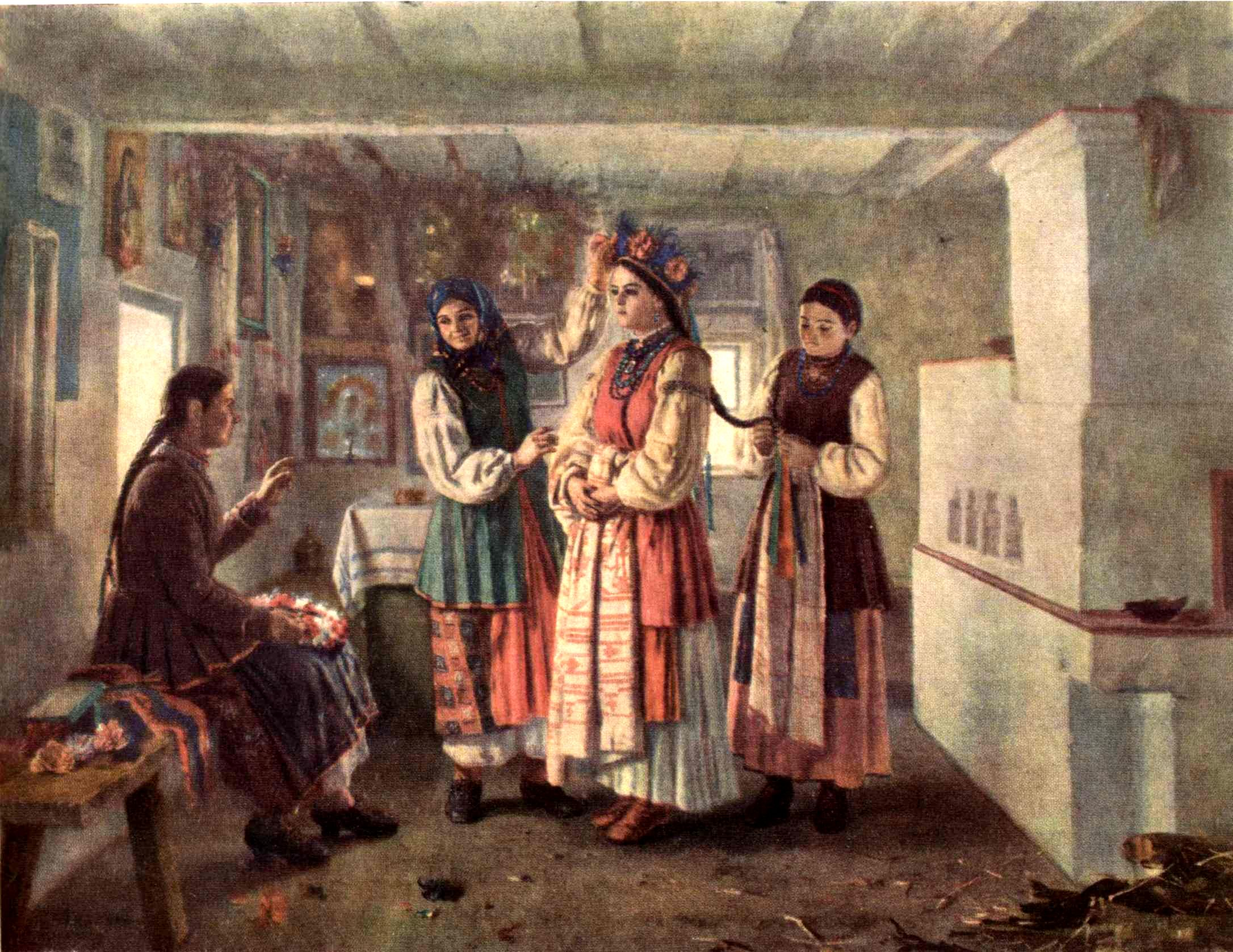
Vasyl Vasyl'ev "Dressing of the bride"

On the second day, the «engagement» took place. People came to the girl's house. Also, the groom came with groomsmen, his family and relatives with music and sat down at the table. During the feast, the groom was giving gifts and treats, after that the parents blessed with bread and rye. Then the young couple sat at the home altar while the guests were singing songs.

== Ohliadyny ==
A day later, the girl's parents, together with their family, went to the boy's house to get acquaintanted with the groom's household.

== Preparation for the wedding ==
=== Hiltse ===
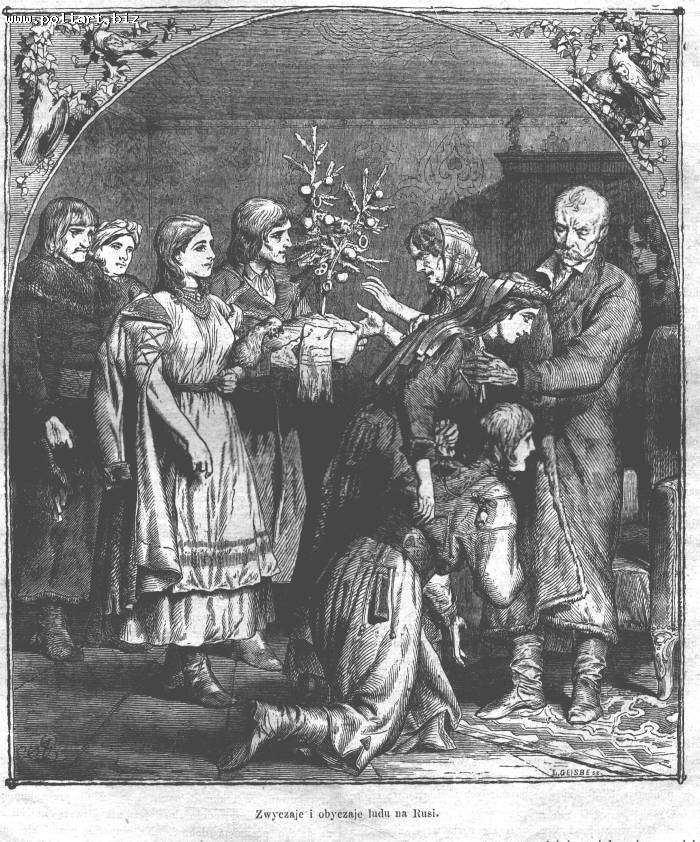
Ukrainian wedding

On Saturday evening, people were making «hiltse» (other names are «vyltse», «viltse», «tree», «rishchka») – a small Ukrainian ritual tree or branch which was decorated with flowers, it was also accompanied by songs, dances and supper. On the same day, women were baking korovai which was decorated with dough birds and flowers. Hiltse (sacred tree) was stuck into bread and decorated with candles, viburnum, gilded nuts, apples, rue, and colored candles. It was placed in the corner opposite the icons. Hiltse was decorated from top to bottom.

=== Wreaths ===
Periwinkle wreaths are made at the same time. It should also be made clear that finished wreaths were gilded. Other girls had wreaths of rue and mint. The custom of weaving wreaths is very old. Among the Boiks, for example, collecting periwinkles for a wreath was a whole ritual. The custom of weaving wreaths is an ancient attribute of the solar cult and especially of marriage. According to de Bauplan, in the 17th century, all the girls who went to invite to a wedding wore wreaths on their hands.

=== Wedding invitations ===
When hiltse and wreaths were ready, the bride and the girls went to invite people to the wedding. It was necessary to leave the house in the direction of the sun. At the same time, the groom with his groomsmen also was walking and inviting people to their wedding. The bride bowed to everyone who was present in the house and even to the children, after that she served bread baked in the form of a cone. Before leaving, she was given gifts collected by bridesmaids and small money for a metal plate that is attached to the shoe. If there was also a girl in the house, she joined them after being invited to the cortege.

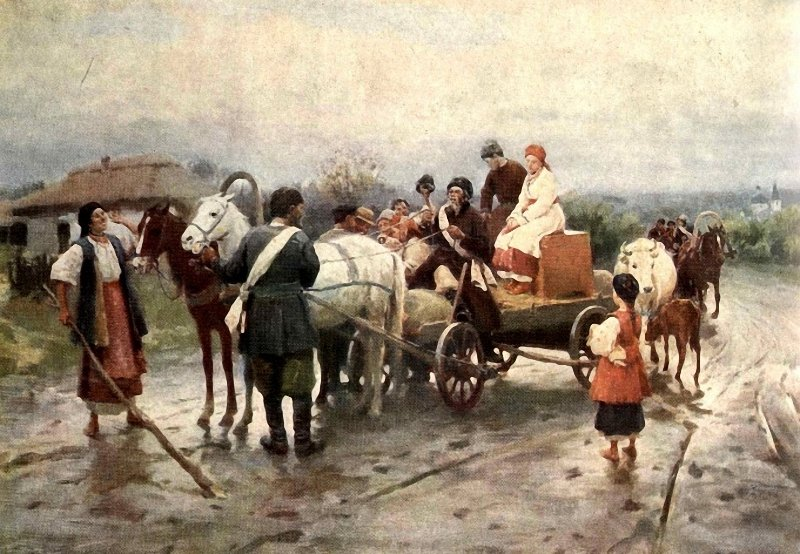
Mykola Pymonenko «Wedding pereima», 1908

After the invitations, the bride returns to the house, where she sits down on an above mentioned «posah». Later, the groom arrives with groomsmen and gifts, and also sits down next to the bride. After the supper, dancing continued all night, and the groom stayed there.

=== Korovai ===
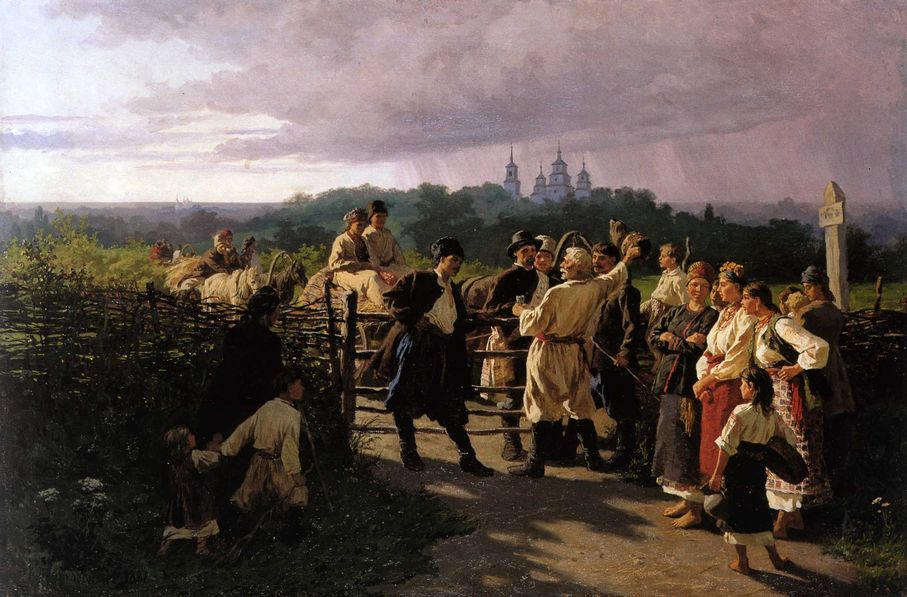
Kostiantyn Trutovskyi "Wedding ransom", 1881

Married women baked korovai. Each woman who was involved in this had to bring some flour, eggs, butter, etc. with her. Newlyweds bloomed themselves with periwinkles and washed their hands. During the preparation of the korovai, the bakers sang ritual songs. Korovai was decorated with the sun, moon, and doves made from the dough. The top of it was decorated with a ring of dough. A cone painted in red was stuck on top. In addition to korovai, people also baked shyshky – wedding ceremony cookies in Ukraine, dyven’ (wedding bread in the form of a thick ring), and lezhen’(Ukrainian wedding ritual bread). After the korovai was placed in the oven, dances began with a bread shovel and a bread trough in which the dough was kneaded.

== Church ceremony ==
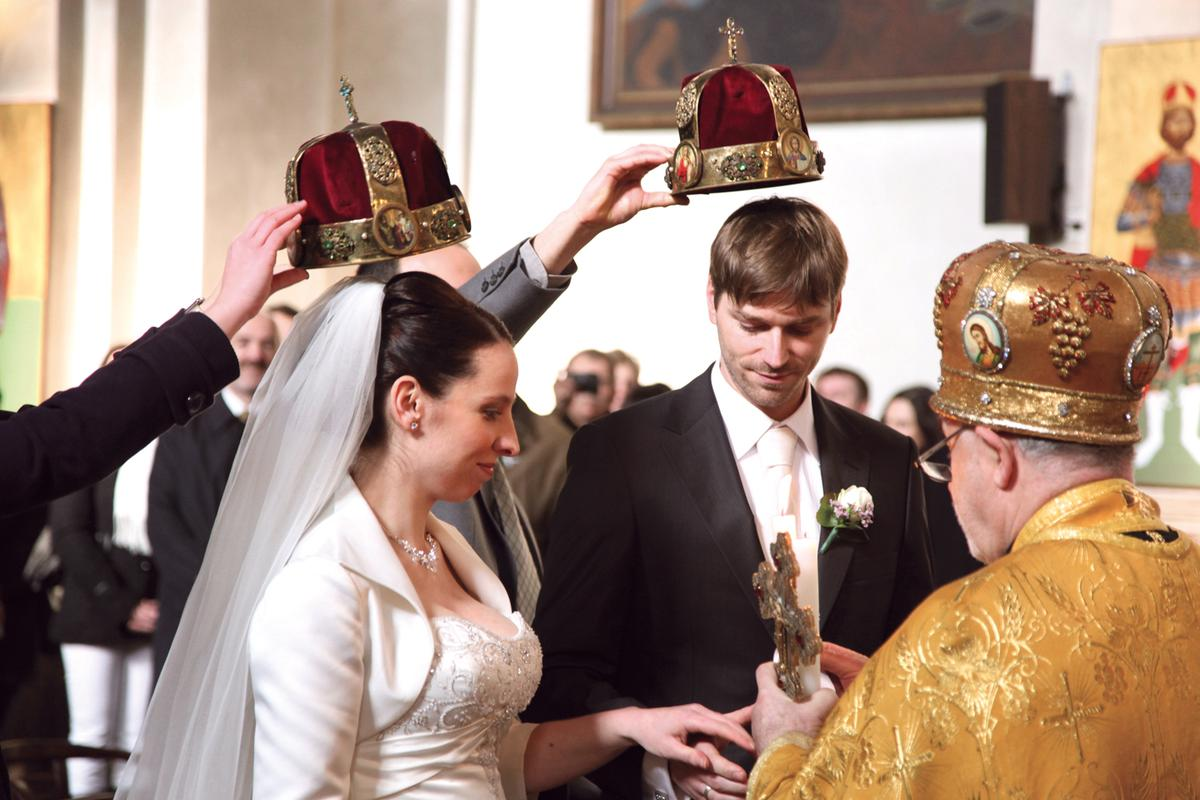
Modern Eastern Orthodox Church wedding, crowning ceremony.

The church ceremony took place on Sunday before lunch, after that everyone went home. Thenceforth, the groom visited his bride. At the entrance, there was a ransom of the bride. The church ceremony was performed by an experienced priest. The newlyweds could choose the church they liked the most.

== Wedding ==
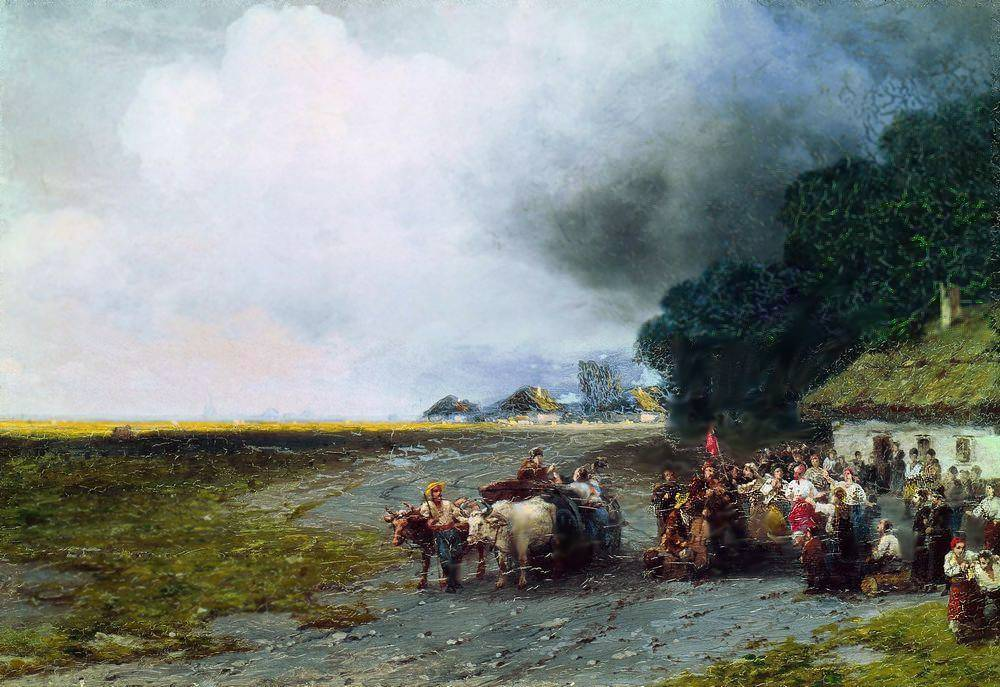
Ivan Ayvazovskyy "Wedding in Ukraine", 1892

Actually, the wedding itself begins with the organization of the train of the groom to the bride. Everything starts with lunch at the groom's. To the sounds of music, guests gather at his house. The groom leaves the house together with boyary (another word for «groomsmen») and greets the company three times. Afterwards he points to the boys who will go with him. The boyar takes off the hats of the boys and to each of the hat there was sewed a red ribbon or bunches of periwinkles. So, this company of boys was called «boyary», and the youngest was called a «kniaz’».The same awards were given to svitylka – the girls who were present in the groom's train. The young man was sitting in a home altar, on the right side were sitting groomsmen, and on the left svitylka. After dinner, the boyar was collecting money, and after those certain rites were held.

Thenceforth, people were dressing up for the road while singing. When the groom was leaving, wedding flags were carried in front of him. In most areas, the groom and his company rode on horseback. On the way to the bride, there were «pereymy», when the groom had to pay money and treat those who stopped him. On the way to the bride, there were, when the groom had to pay money and treat those who stopped him.

The groom's train stopped before the closed gate. Two boyary went to the yard from the side of the groom and met two boyary from the side of the bride at the table in the middle of the yard. After "negotiations" at the table («ransom» of a bride), the groom was allowed into the yard.

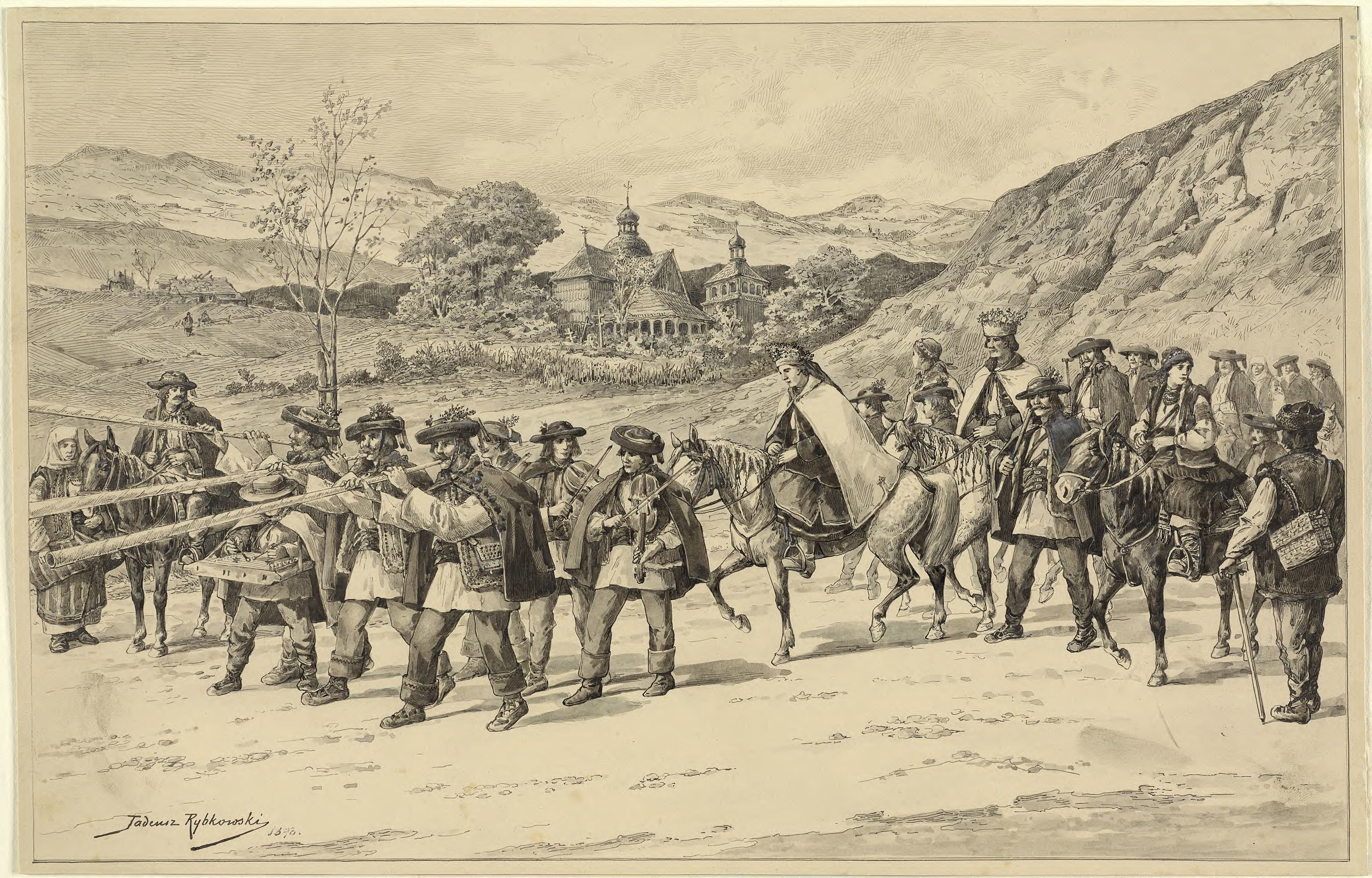
Wedding of hutsuls, 1897

The bride's mother came out to meet groom's train in a turned-out coat and with a bowl of water and oats in her hands. After the groom sat down next to the bride, the distribution of gifts among the girl's relatives began. From the bride's side, everyone was presented with embroidered towels.

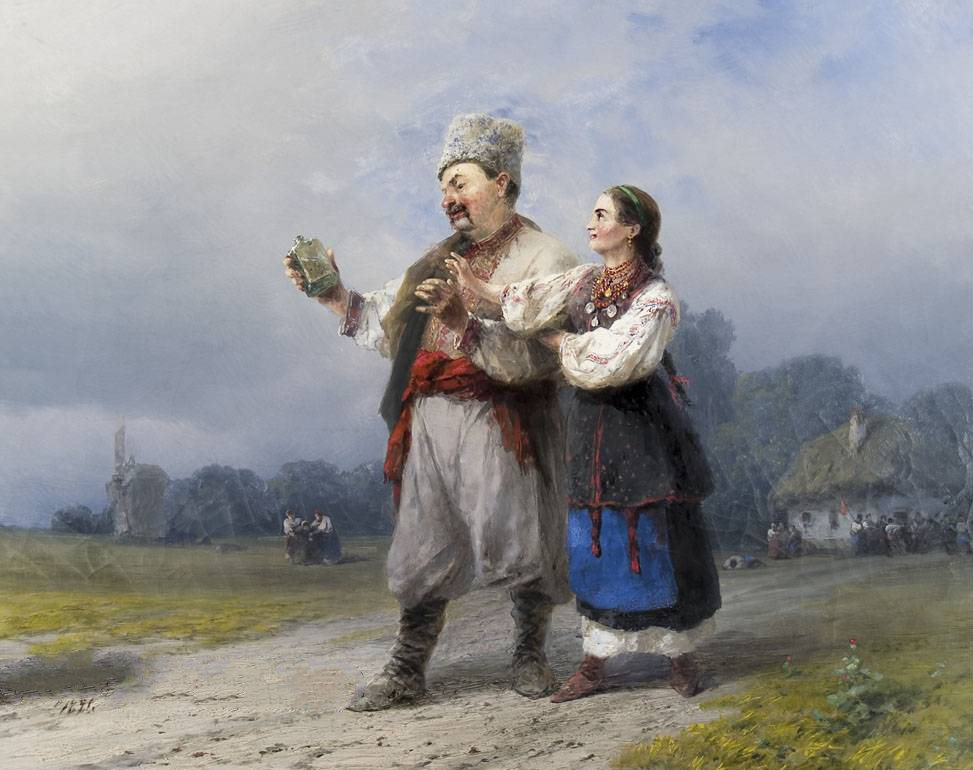
After wedding. Ivan Ayvazovskyy, 1891

After that, they started covering, unbraiding the braid and putting on the serpanok. (a married woman's headdress of transparent, light fabric, having the appearance of a scarf). The bride was dressed in ochipock, and her mother tied a wimple (namitka). This ceremony was accompanied by singing. After covering the bride's head, korovai was brought and distributed according to the order of kinship and age.

The next rite was moving the bride to the groom's house, which began with supper.

The second day of the wedding took place on Monday and the third on Tuesday. The fourth day (according to B. Hrinchenko) in Galicia was called kolachyny. However, in different regions, this rite could take place even later.

=== Wedding in the Lemko region ===
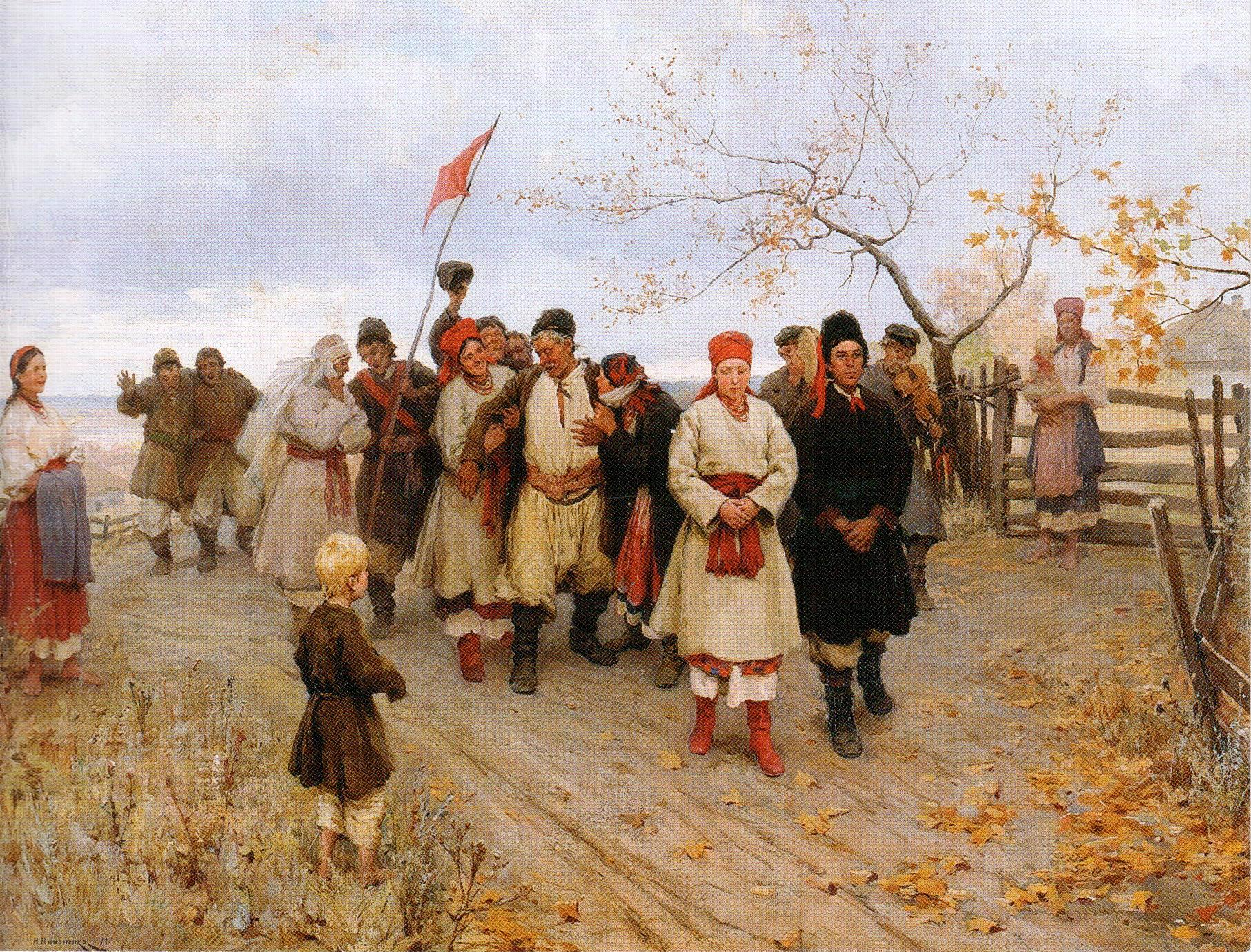
M. Pymonenko, Wedding in Kyiv, 1891

Weddings in the Lemko region were preceded by parties where youth gathered. If someone was looking for a girl, then they took starosty and went to the girl's house for a visit (also called zalioty), during which they agreed on wine. After that, the girl's parents went to visit the boy (ohliadyny). The wedding itself began on Saturday with a groomsmen's dance. On Thursday afternoon, the groom went to invite his relatives, friends etc. for a wedding, and on Saturday evening, groomsmen were doing it again. On the same day, at the bride's was being made rishchka. When the hudaky (musicians) played the wedding song, the guests began to gather, and a friend of the bride (svashka), who in the traditional ceremony was performed by the married sister of the groom, in her absence – another close relative, was putting on the wedding decorations. After the feast and blessing, the groom with music went to the bride, who was getting dressed at that time. From a bride, they went together to the church ceremony. After that, there was a feast at the bride's house as well as two hours of dancing and supper. When the supper was finished, people left or went to the groom. The svashky were going home at that time. The groom invited all the wedding guests to sit at the table and treat themselves. On Monday, all the guests of the groosman were invited to the groom, and svashky began to remove the vinets (a headgear) from brides head and put on chepets (also known as ochipok). After that, the bride distributes parts of rishchka. to the guests. Afterwards, there are dances and after the dances – prydany – the process, when wedding guests from the bride's side, go with her to the groom's house.

=== Clothes ===
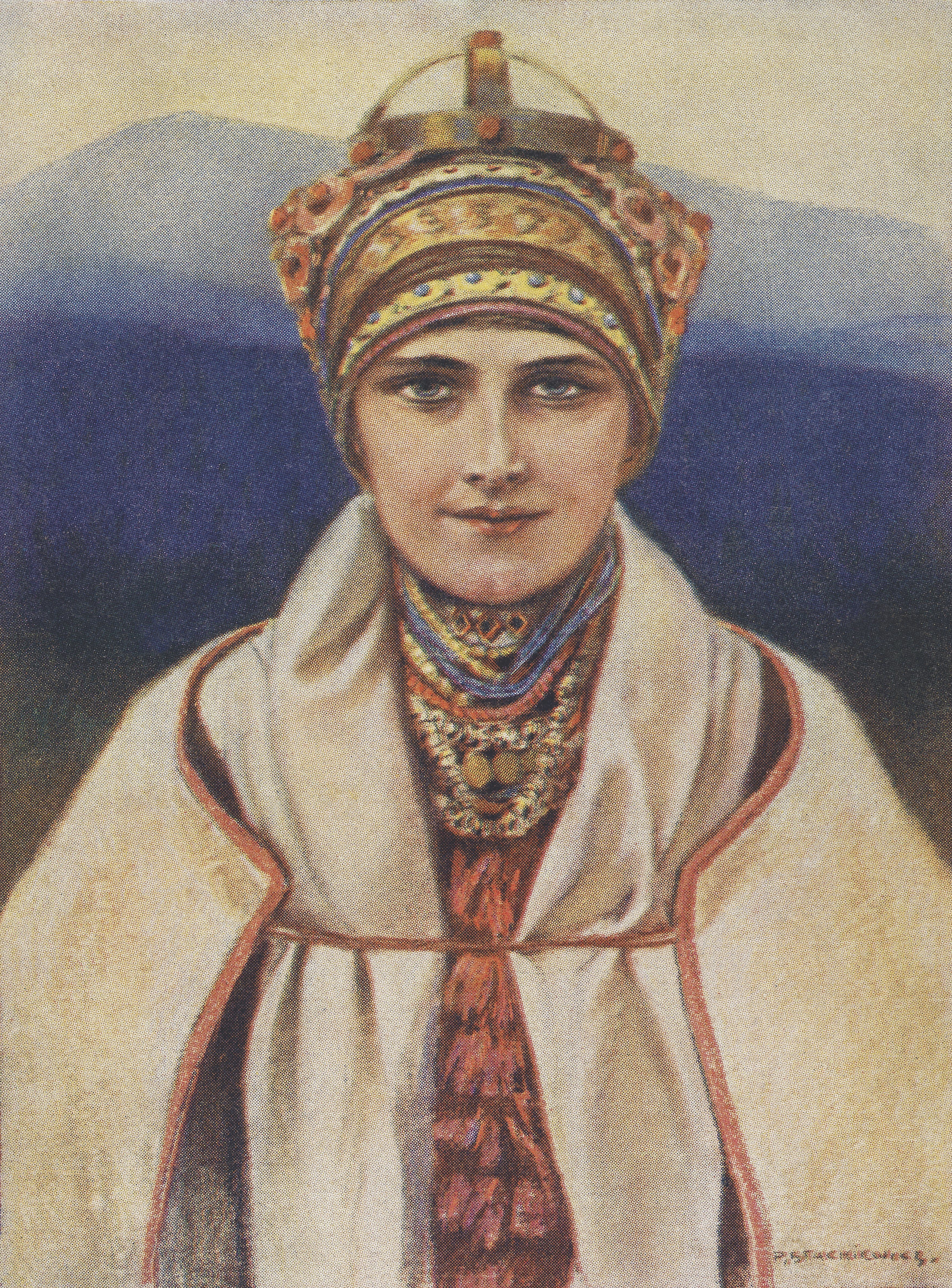
A bride from Chornohora. Piotr Stachiewicz

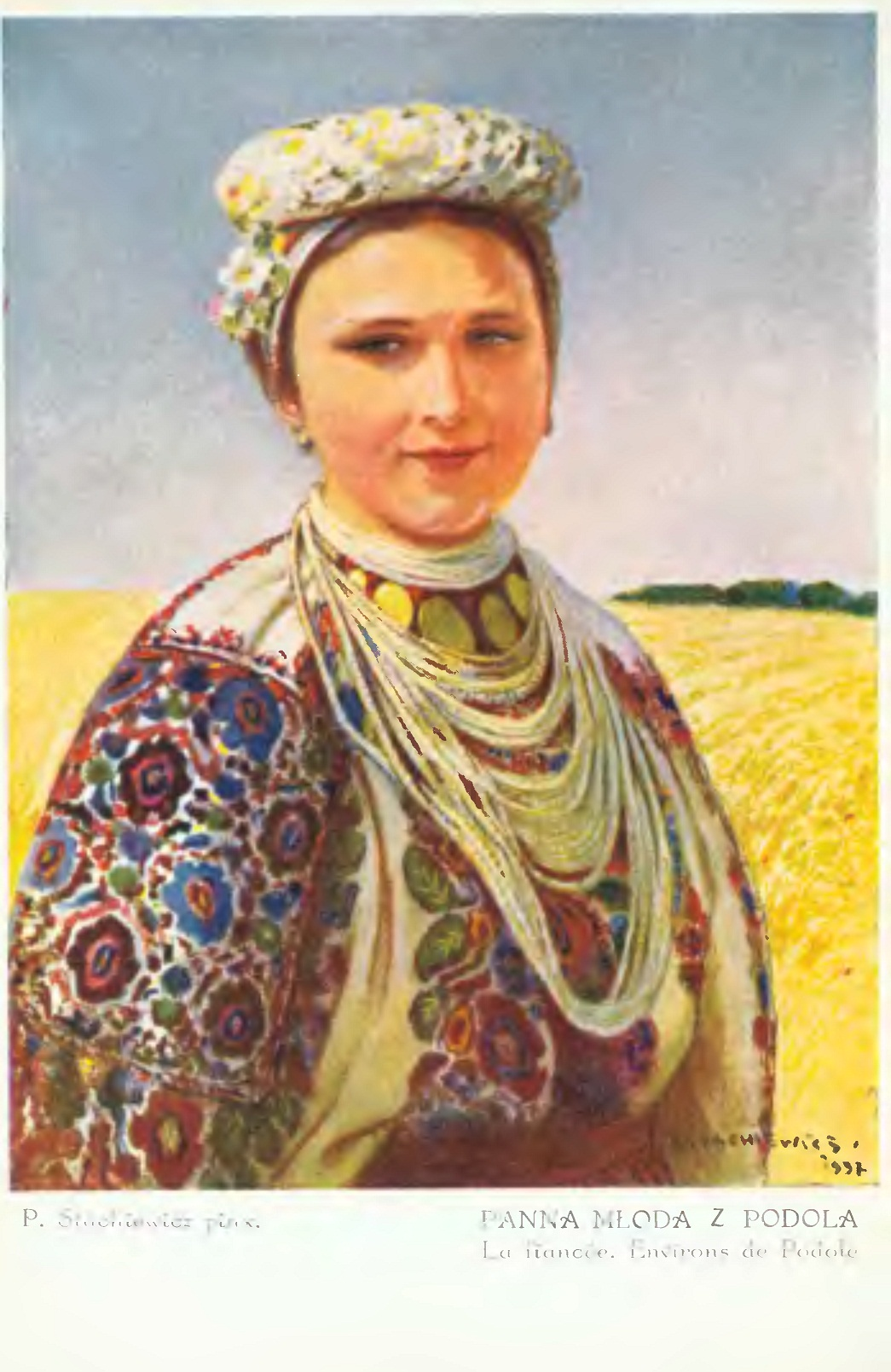
A bride from Podillia. Piotr Stachiewicz 1937

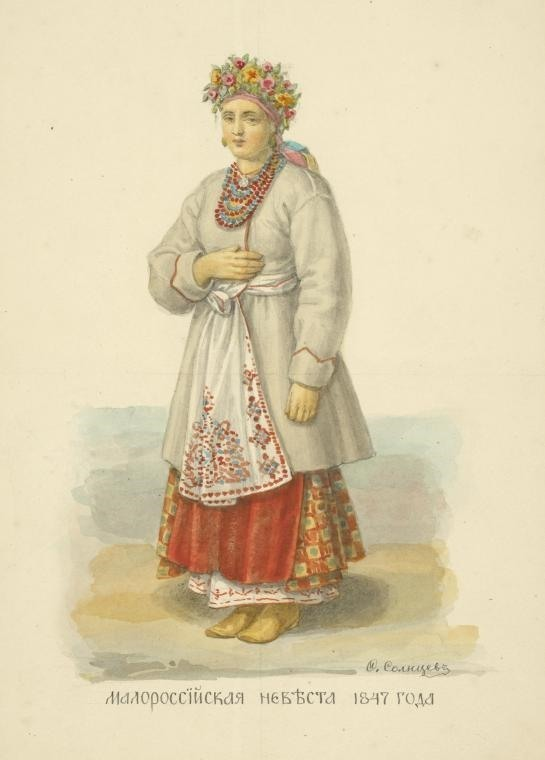
Slobozhanshchyna 1847

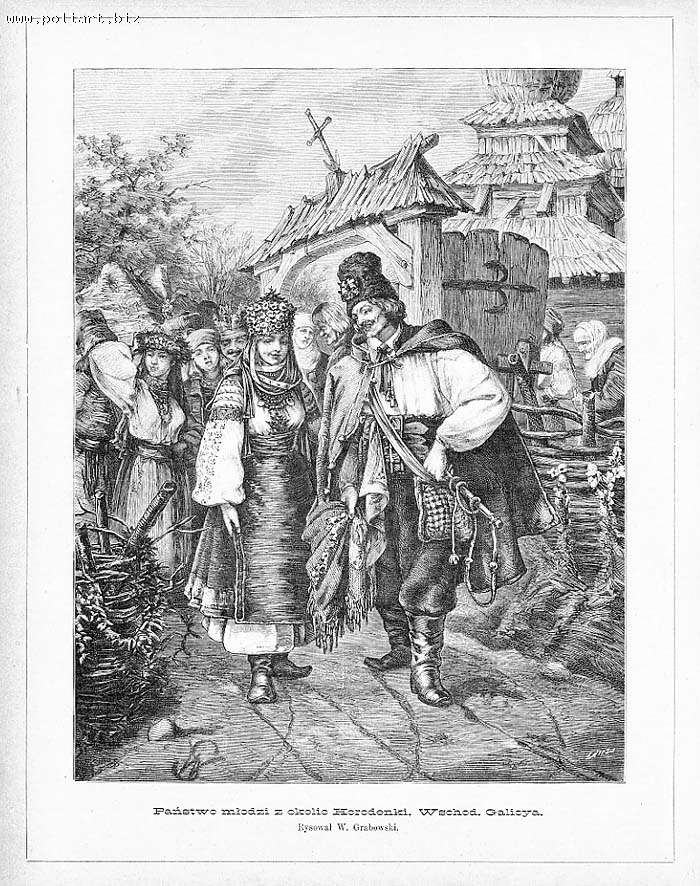
Wedding in Pokuttia

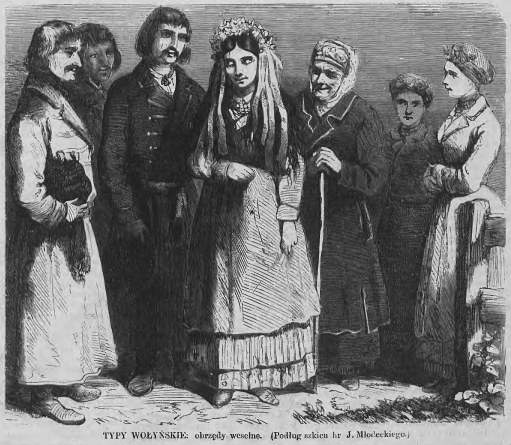
Wedding in Volhynia region. J. Młodecki

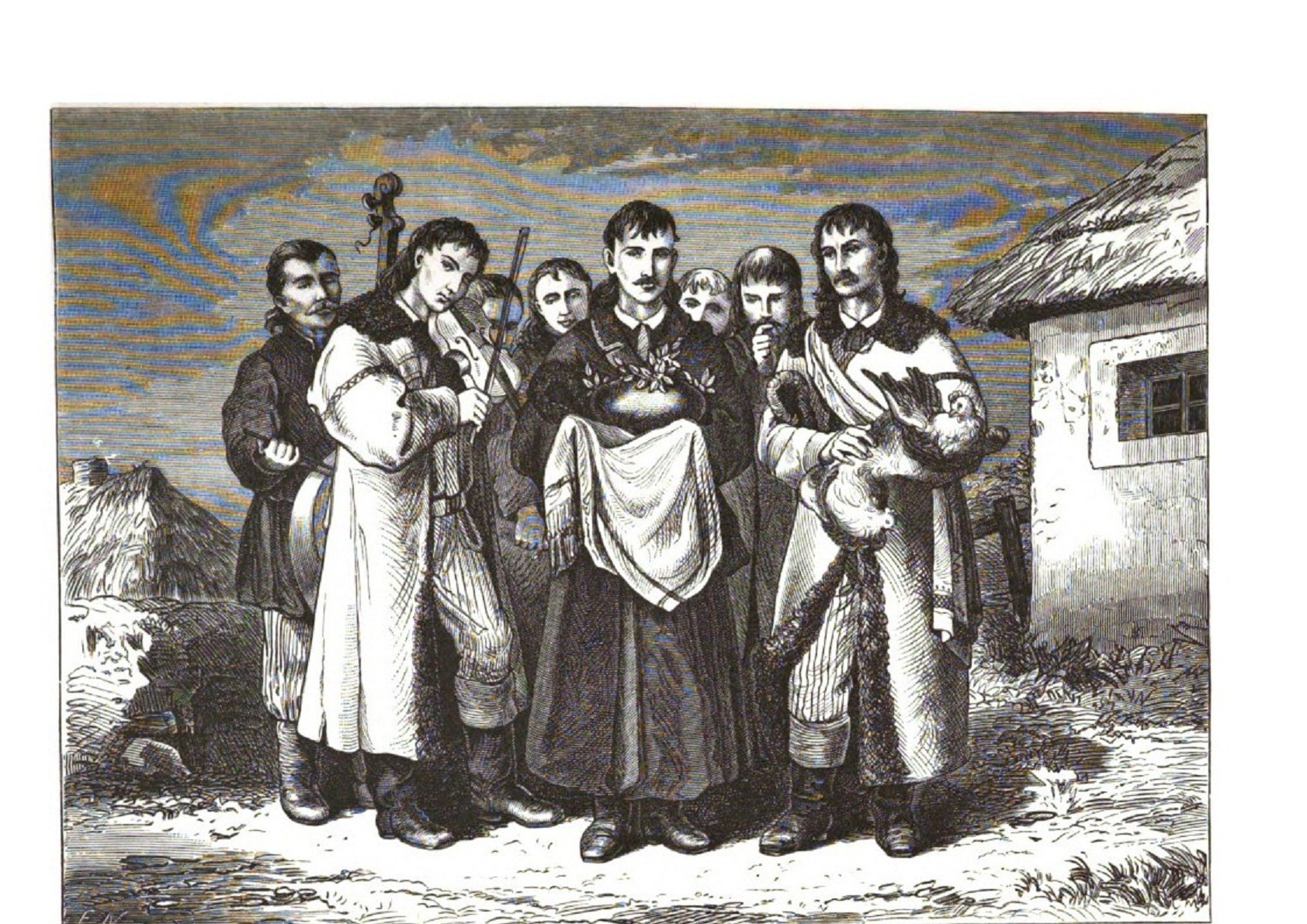
A wedding trip with a korovai in the Ternopil region

=== Traditions ===
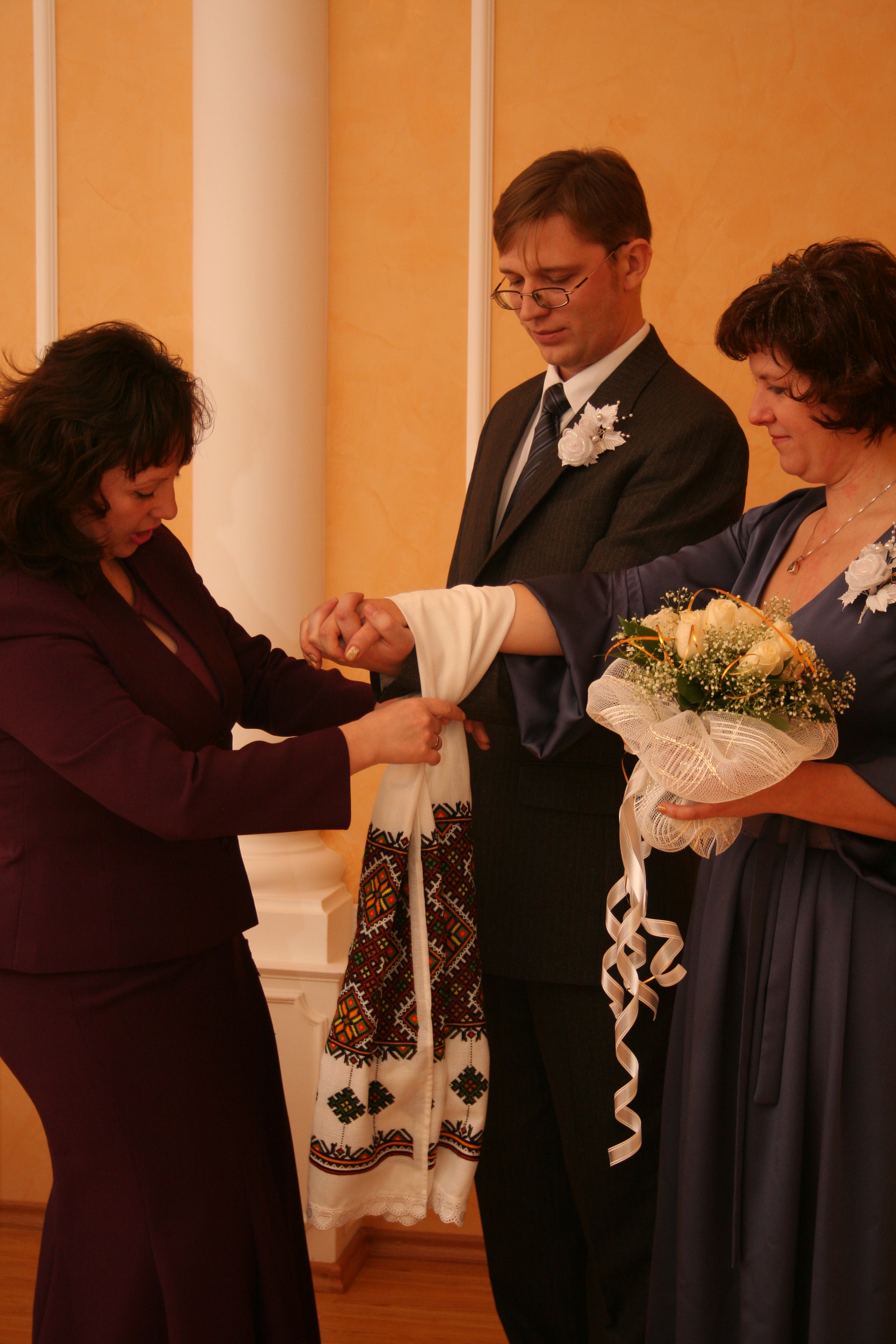
Hand Fasting at a civil ceremony

Rushnyk – is a Ukrainian embroidered long ritual cloth. Rushnyks are very important part of the ceremony and have symbolic meaning. They are often part of the bride's dowry and have pairs of birds embroidered on them, representing the wedding couple. Svashky is a woman's choir that sings during the wedding ceremony. Korovai is the ceremonial and symbolic wedding bread. Traditionally it was a large round braided bread, baked from wheat flour and decorated with symbolic flags and figurines, such as suns, moons, birds, animals, and pine cones. It was given to the bride and groom as a blessing.

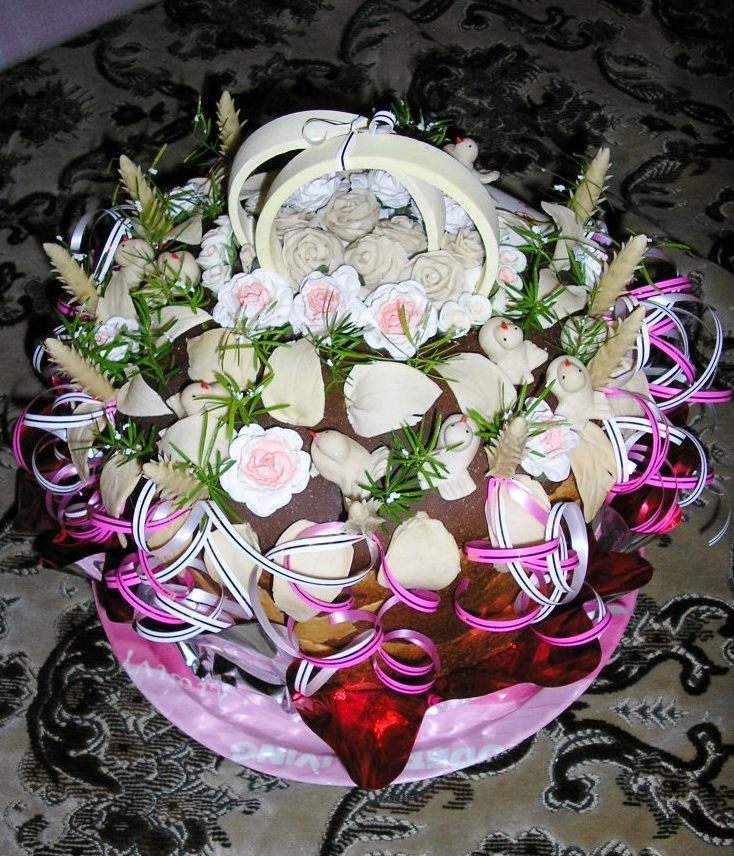
Korovai

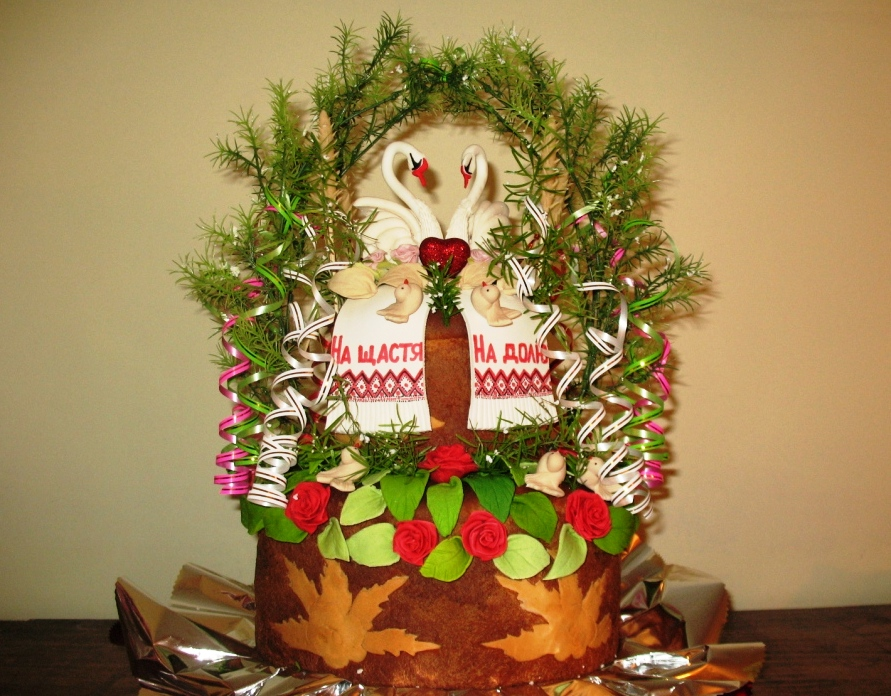
Korovai

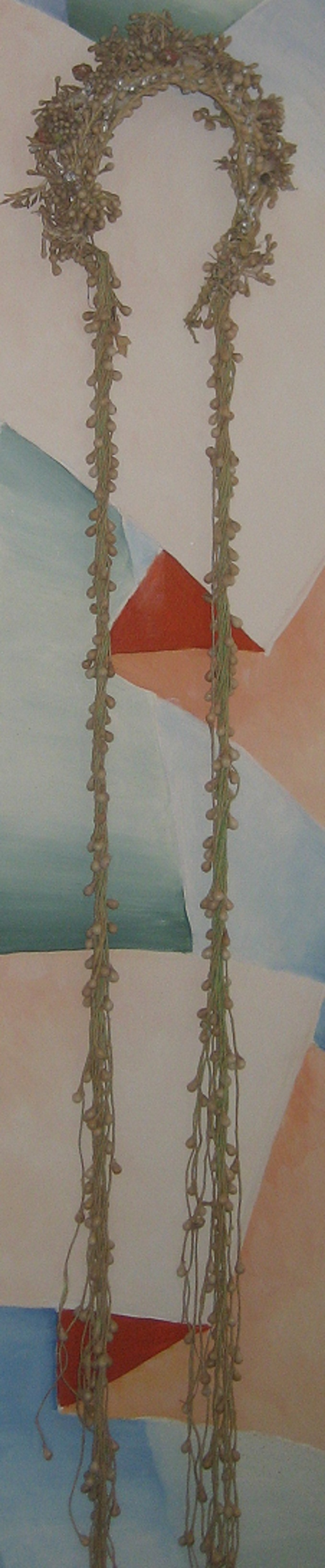
Wax wedding wreath from Podillia

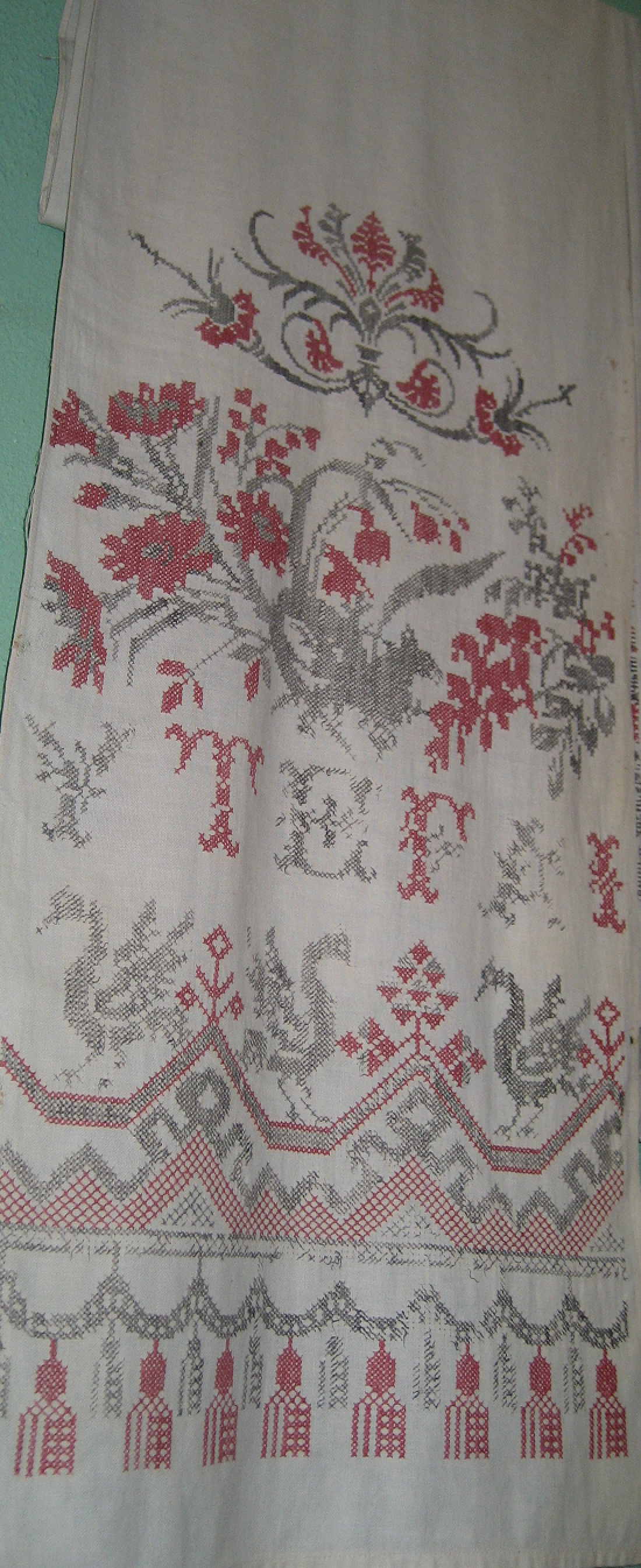
Wedding towel

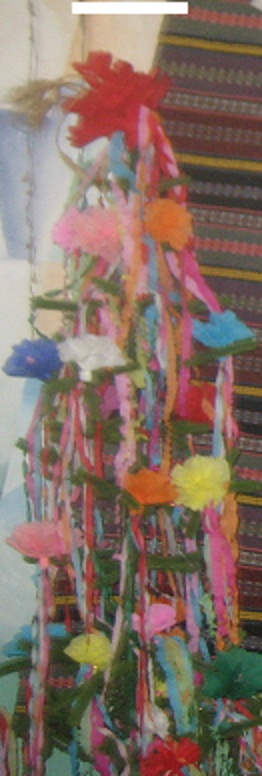
Wedding tree "Hiltse"

== Weddings and funerals ==
Young women who die unmarried are buried in a wedding dress in some areas. The most followed religion in Ukraine is Eastern Orthodox and when it comes to funerals it has strict rules. The mourning period is very important and because it is believed that the soul of the person wanders the earth for 40 days, there are ceremonies that pay respect to the dead. It is believed that on the 3rd day the soul leaves the body, on the 9th day spirit leaves the body and on the 40th day the body starts to die as well. One of the most important and interesting parts of a Ukrainian funeral is the preparation of the body which includes washing the body to get rid of worldly sins, but this is mostly performed by the family and friends because in Ukrainian traditions the family has to take care of the loved one to the end. The next step is dressing the dead in clean, all white clothes as a symbol of purity. Then the body is placed in the casket in the family home and is let to rest for a few days. Next comes the wake which is done the night before the actual funeral and lasts the whole night. On this night friends and family gather in the house and mourn for the deceased.

== See also ==
- Весільні чини
- Гільце
- Коровай
- Весільний рушник
