= Florian Cynk =

Polish painter (1838–1912)

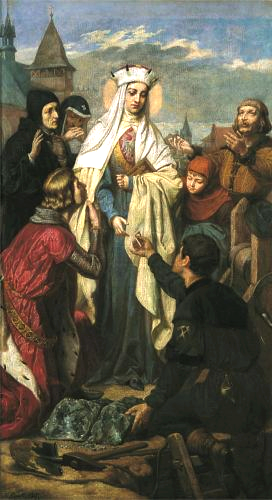
Saint Kinga

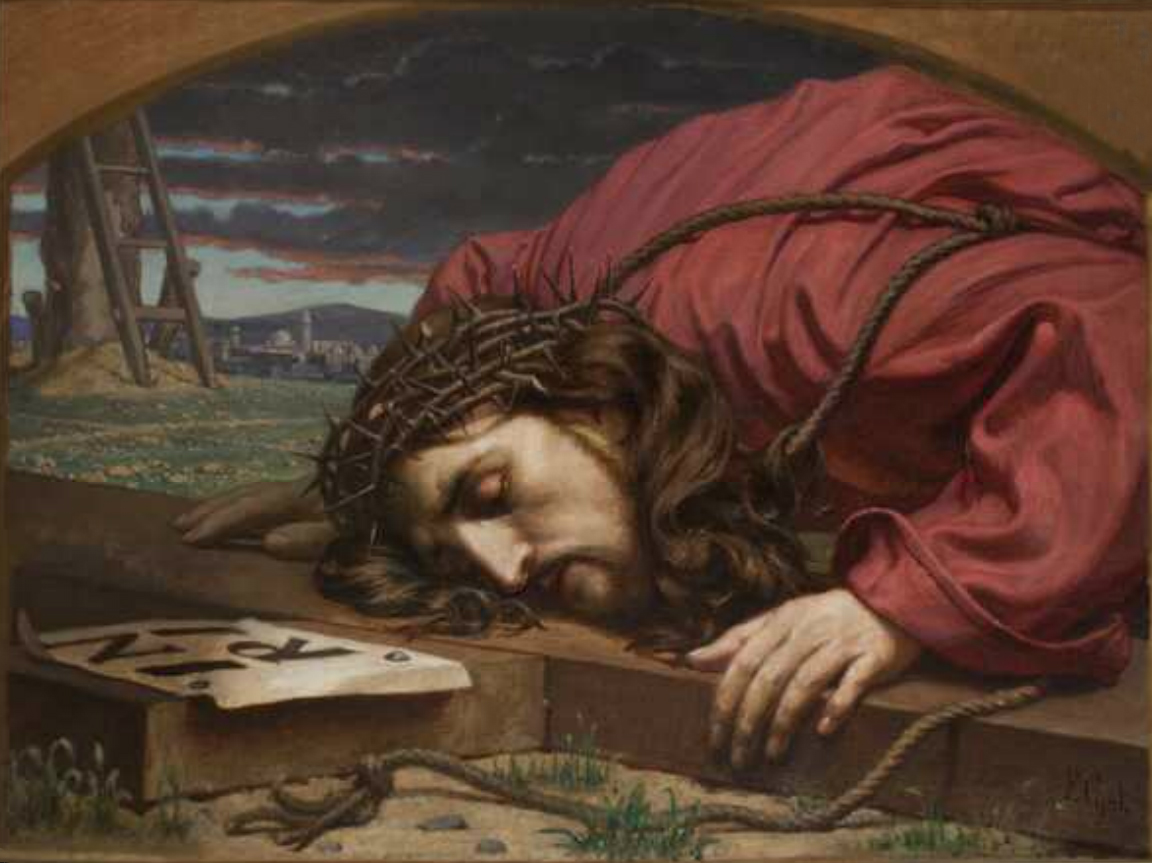
Christ Collapsing on the Cross

Florian Stanisław Cynk (3 May 1838 – 10 October 1912) was a Polish painter, notably of religious subjects, and a prominent art teacher. He also worked as an illustrator.

== Biography ==
He was born in Kraków and began his studies at the Academy of Fine Arts in Kraków with Wojciech Stattler and Władysław Łuszczkiewicz. Later, he attended the Dresden Academy of Fine Arts (1862-1863) and the Academy of Fine Arts, Munich (1863-1867).

In 1877, he was appointed a professor of drawing at his alma mater, the Kraków Academy. While there, he made copies of works by Jan Matejko that would be turned into woodcuts, and he helped Matejko plot the perspective on his huge paintings. He also provided illustrations for Tygodnik Illustrowany and other periodicals.

In 1886, he was elected President of the Kraków Society of Friends of Fine Arts. In 1888, he painted "Our Lady of the Polish Crown" for the altar of a church in Stryj and, together with Matejko, created portraits of Saints Kinga and Adalbert at a church in Stary Wiśnicz.

Many of his students would become well-known artists; including Stanisław Wyspiański, Piotr Stachiewicz, Jan Wojnarski, Ludwik Stasiak, Artur Markowicz, Wojciech Weiss, Ludwik Misky, Józef Rapacki, Stefan Filipkiewicz, Władysław Benda and Zefiryn Ćwikliński.

Cynk died in Kraków on 10 October 1912.
