= Ludwik Misky =

Polish painter (1884–1938)

Ludwik de Delney Misky
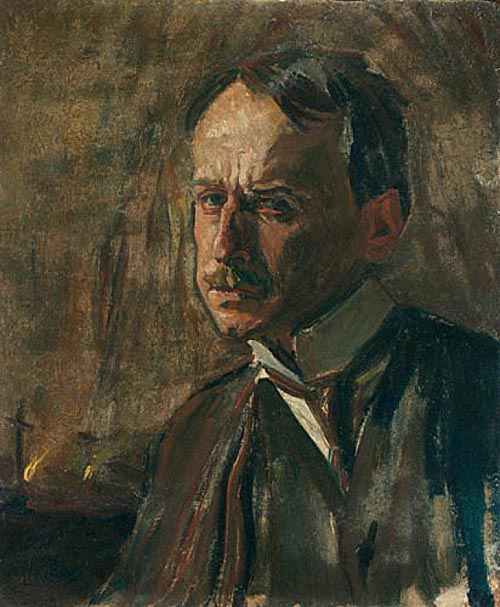
- Self-portrait (1920s)
- Born: 16 January 1884; Nowy Sącz, Poland
- Died: 1 February 1938 (aged 54); Kraków, Poland
- Occupation: Painter

Ludwik de Delney Misky (1884–1938) was a Polish painter in the Post-Impressionistic style.

== Biography ==
His family was originally from Hungary. After finishing his primary education in Wadowice, he entered the Kraków Academy of Fine Arts in 1902, where his teachers were Florian Cynk, Leon Wyczółkowski, Józef Pankiewicz and Józef Mehoffer, among others. He also studied philosophy and art history at the Jagellonian University.

After that, he continued his studies in Dresden, Leipzig, Berlin and Vienna. he returned to Kraków in 1907 and took employment as a drawing teacher. Later, he would become a school inspector. In 1925, he was one of the cofounders of "Jednoróg" (Unicorn); an art society that was a precursor to the Kapists. After 1927, he worked for the Board of Trustees of the Kraków School District as head of the department of vocational schools.

For most of his career, he painted landscapes, portraits and still-lifes. In his later years, he concentrated on the graphic arts, including metal and wood engraving. He also designed bookplates and tapestries. The largest collection of his works is in Gorzeń Górny, at the manor house formerly owned by the writer Emil Zegadłowicz.

In addition to his painting, he wrote numerous articles on how to teach drawing, as well as books on the methodology and organization of teaching in general.

== Selected paintings ==
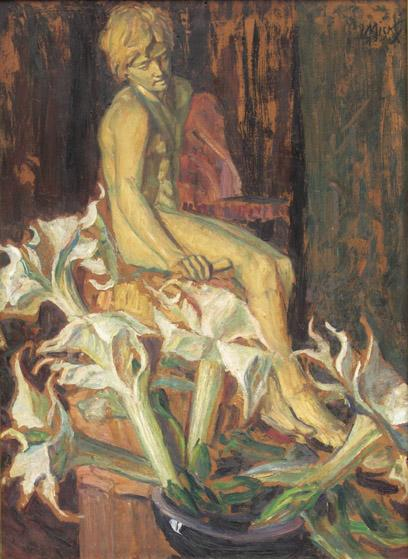
Nude

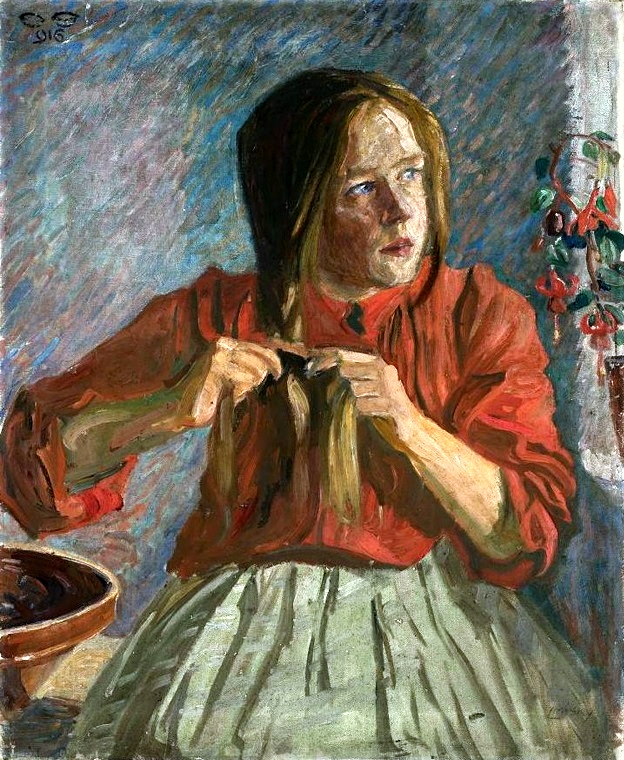
A Girl Plaiting Her Hair

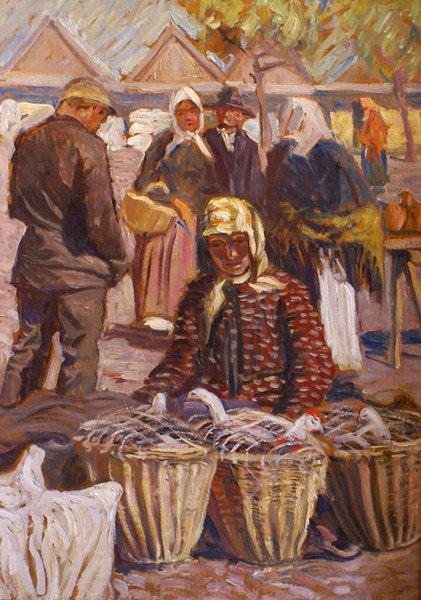
Galician Fair

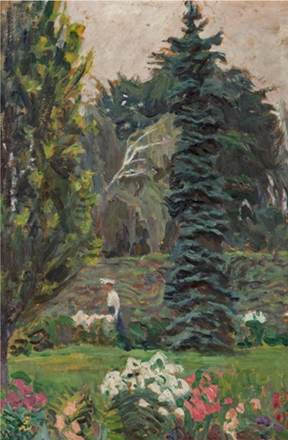
Woman in the Park
