= Jan Wojnarski =

Polish painter, graphic artist and art professor

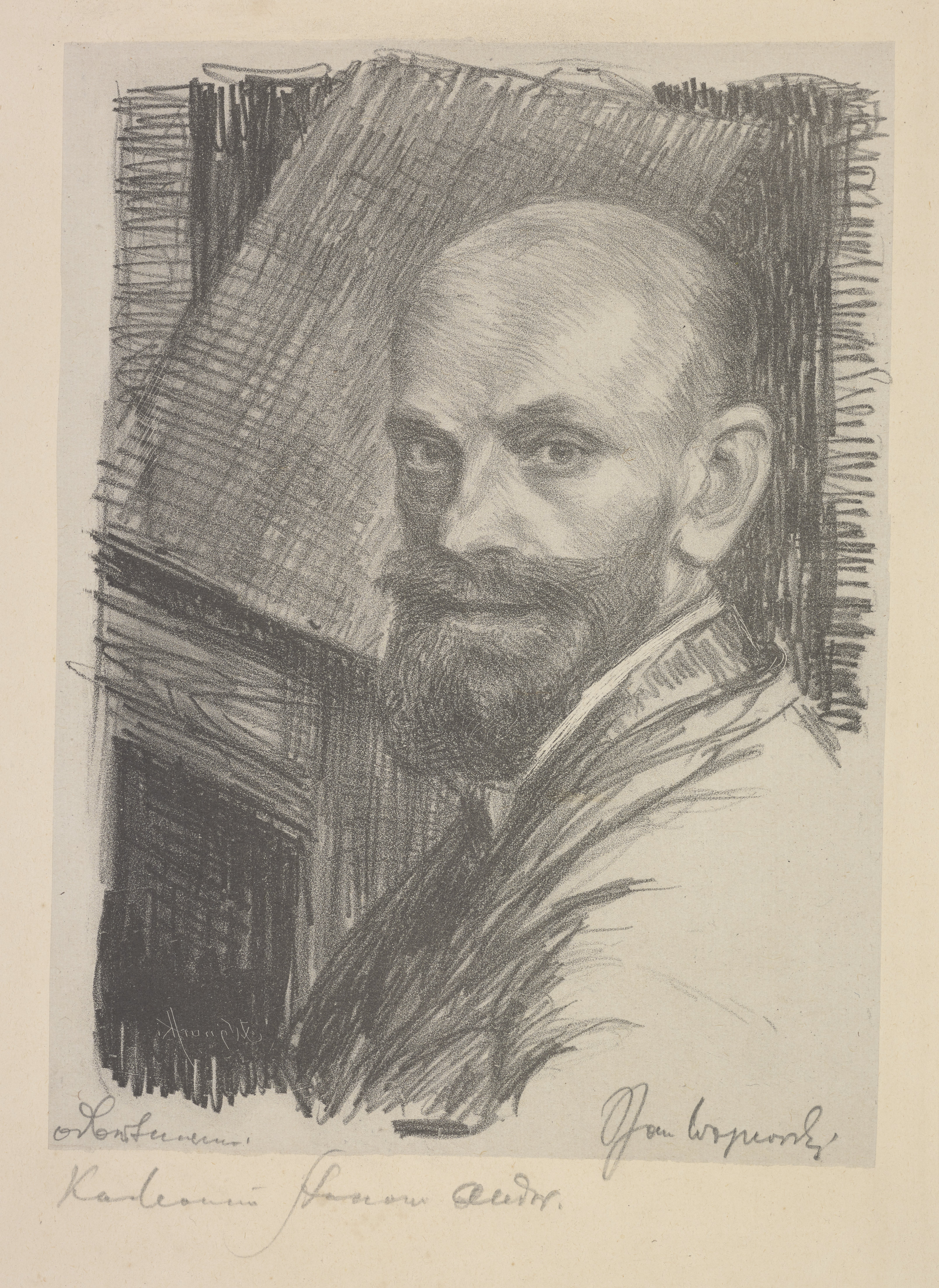
Self-portrait (c.1925)

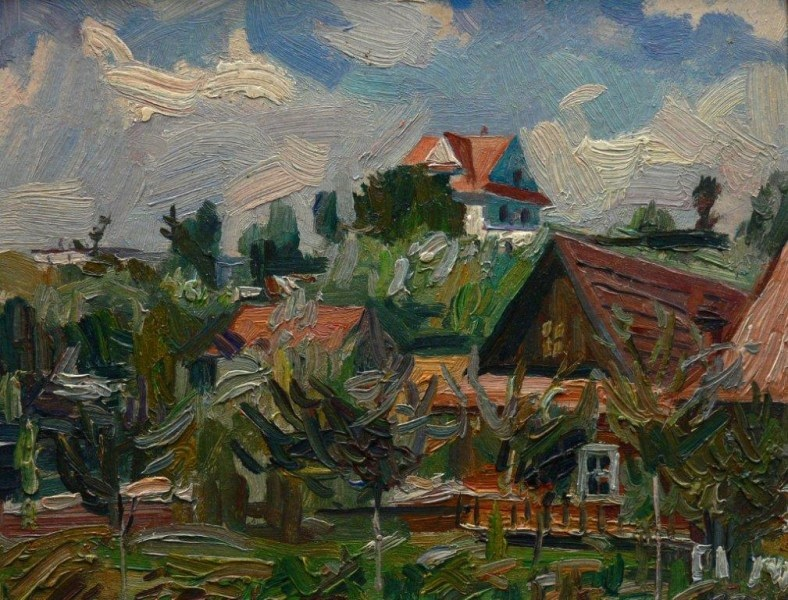
Zaryte

Jan Józef Wojnarski (1 December 1879, Tarnów – 14 October 1937, Kraków) was a Polish painter, graphic artist and art professor.

== Biography ==
His father was a church organist. From 1902, he studied at the Kraków Academy of Fine Arts, under the tutelage of Florian Cynk, Jan Stanisławski and Leon Wyczółkowski. During the years 1904 and 1905, he made a study trip to Italy. After returning, he studied graphics with Józef Pankiewicz.

From 1911, he worked at the Kraków Academy; initially as a junior assistant, then full assistant and, finally, as Professor of Graphic Arts from 1929. Most of his works are small scale landscapes, which show the influence of Stanisławski.

Those landscapes received numerous awards at national and international exhibitions. In 1937, he won a gold medal at the Exposition Internationale des Arts et Techniques dans la Vie Moderne in Paris. That same year, he was awarded the Officer's Cross in the Order of Polonia Restituta.

His graphic works are also well known; etchings, lithographs and copperplates among them. His self-portrait is in the British Museum. Many of his works may be seen at the National Museum, Kraków and the National Museum, Warsaw.

He married Kazimierą Musiałowicz and they had two sons, Krzysztofa and Jan, who became the first post-war mayor of Oliwa.
