= Piotr Stachiewicz =

Polish painter and illustrator (1858–1938)

- Born: October 29, 1858; Nowosiółki Gościnne, Russian Empire (now Ukraine)
- Died: April 14, 1938 (aged 79); Kraków
- Education: Kraków Academy of Fine Arts; Academy of Fine Arts, Munich
- Known for: Painting, illustration
- Awards: Polish Academy of Learning award Order of Polonia Restituta

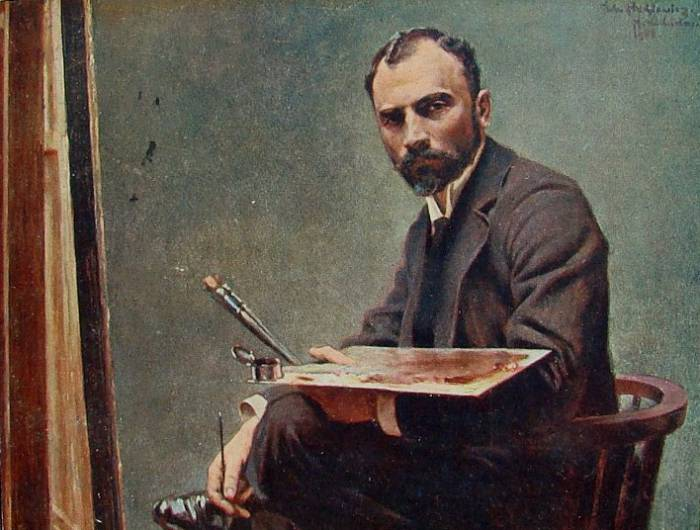
Self-portrait (c.1900)

Piotr Stachiewicz (29 October 1858, Nowosiółki Gościnne, (now Ukraine) - 14 April 1938, Kraków) was a Polish painter and illustrator.

== Biography ==
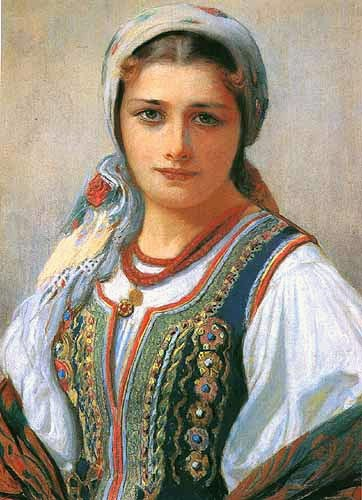
Beautiful Sophy

From 1877 to 1883, he studied at the Kraków Academy of Fine Arts with Władysław Łuszczkiewicz and Florian Cynk. From 1883 to 1885, he continued his studies at the Academy of Fine Arts, Munich, with Otto Seitz. Upon graduating, he took an extensive trip, visiting Italy, Greece and Jerusalem.

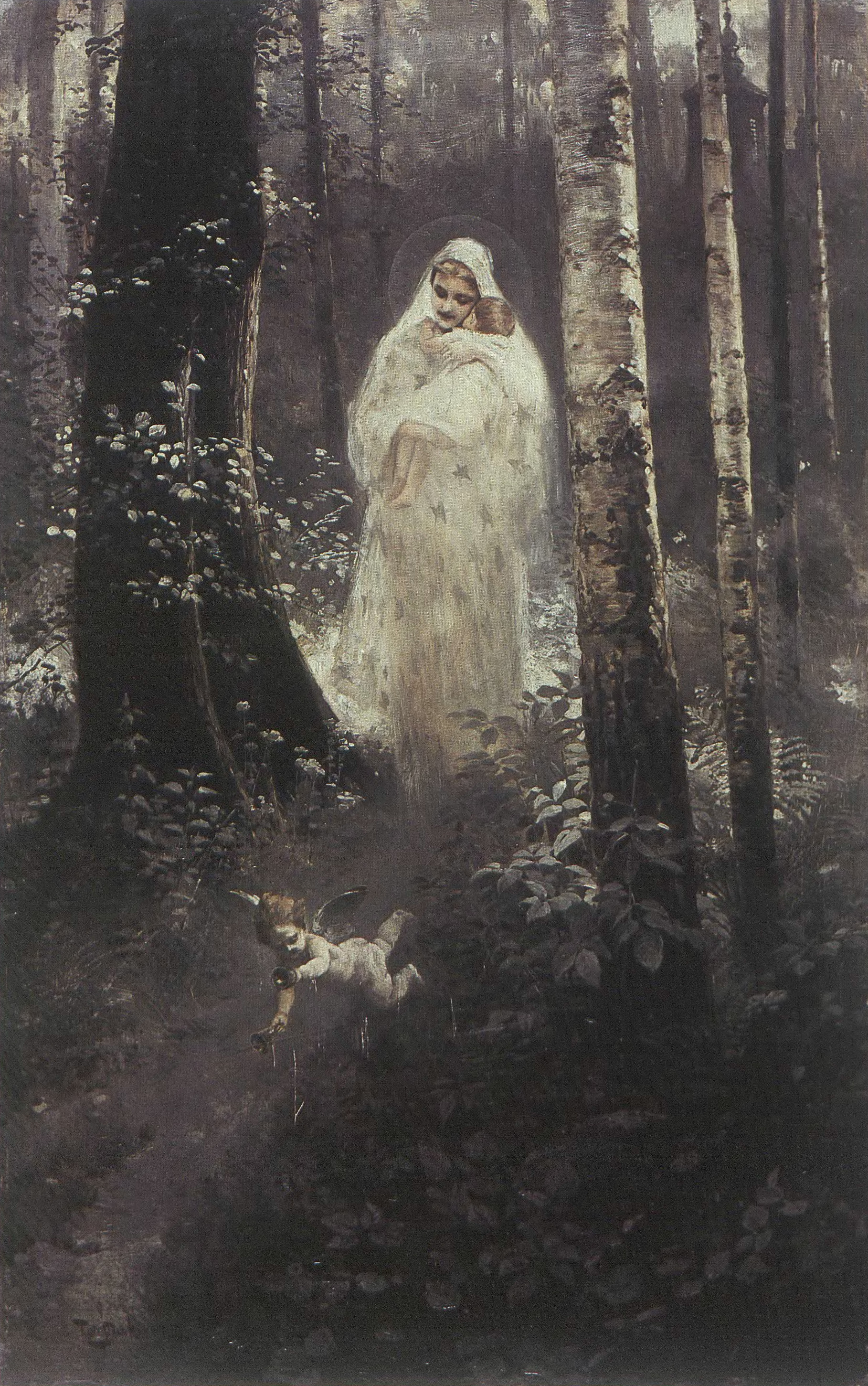
Legend of the Virgin Mary (Queen of Heaven) No. 4

After that, he settled in Kraków, where he painted portraits, historical scenes and religious art. During this period, he created some of his best-known works; a series featuring the famous model, Zofia Paluchowa, wearing traditional folk costumes. He also designed mosaics for the Basilica of the Sacred Heart of Jesus. In 1889, he became a member of the Kraków Society of Friends of Fine Arts and served as its Vice-President from 1900 to 1913. In 1893, he refused an offer to be named Director of the Kraków Academy, as it was undergoing a major reorganization which would have required him to fire some of his old instructors.

He was also a prolific illustrator for works by Adam Mickiewicz, Maria Konopnicka and Józef Ignacy Kraszewski. His most notable work in this area was a series of 22 paintings made for Quo Vadis by Henryk Sienkiewicz and reproduced as postcards. They were apparently considered lost but, in 2014, were found and returned from the United States for an exhibition in Poland. Other sources indicate they were simply in a private collection and were exhibited at the Detroit Institute of Arts in 1953.

From 1893 to 1895, he produced a series of paintings depicting the workers in the Wieliczka Salt Mines, which earned him an award from the Polish Academy of Learning. The originals were lost during World War II, but some color reproductions survived.

Together with Włodzimierz Tetmajer, he founded a bi-weekly art magazine, Świat (The World). He was also known for a series of religious paintings on the Black Madonna of Częstochowa. In 1923, he was awarded the Order of Polonia Restituta.

== Selected works ==
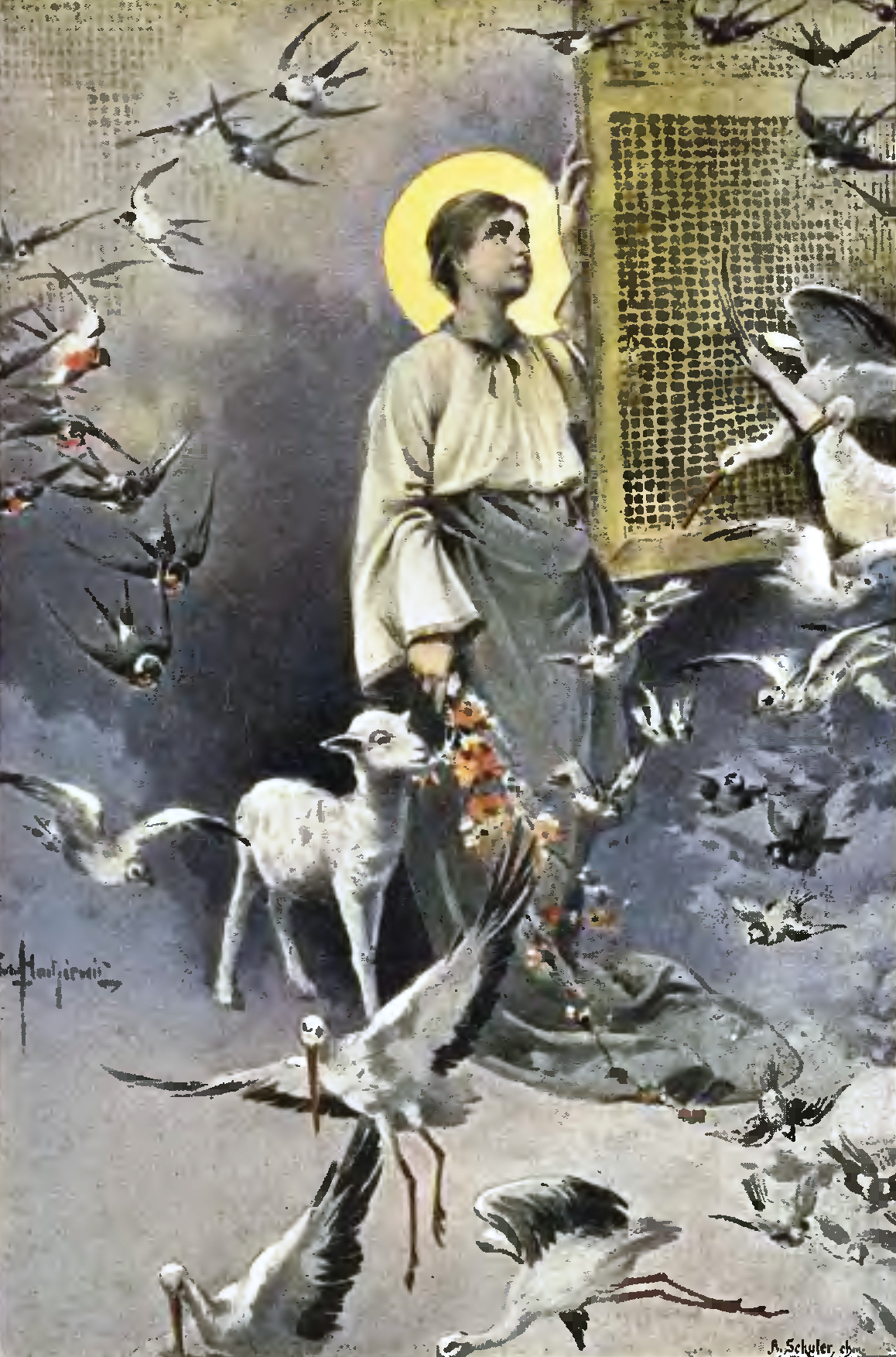
Cover illustration for "New Summer" by Konopnicka

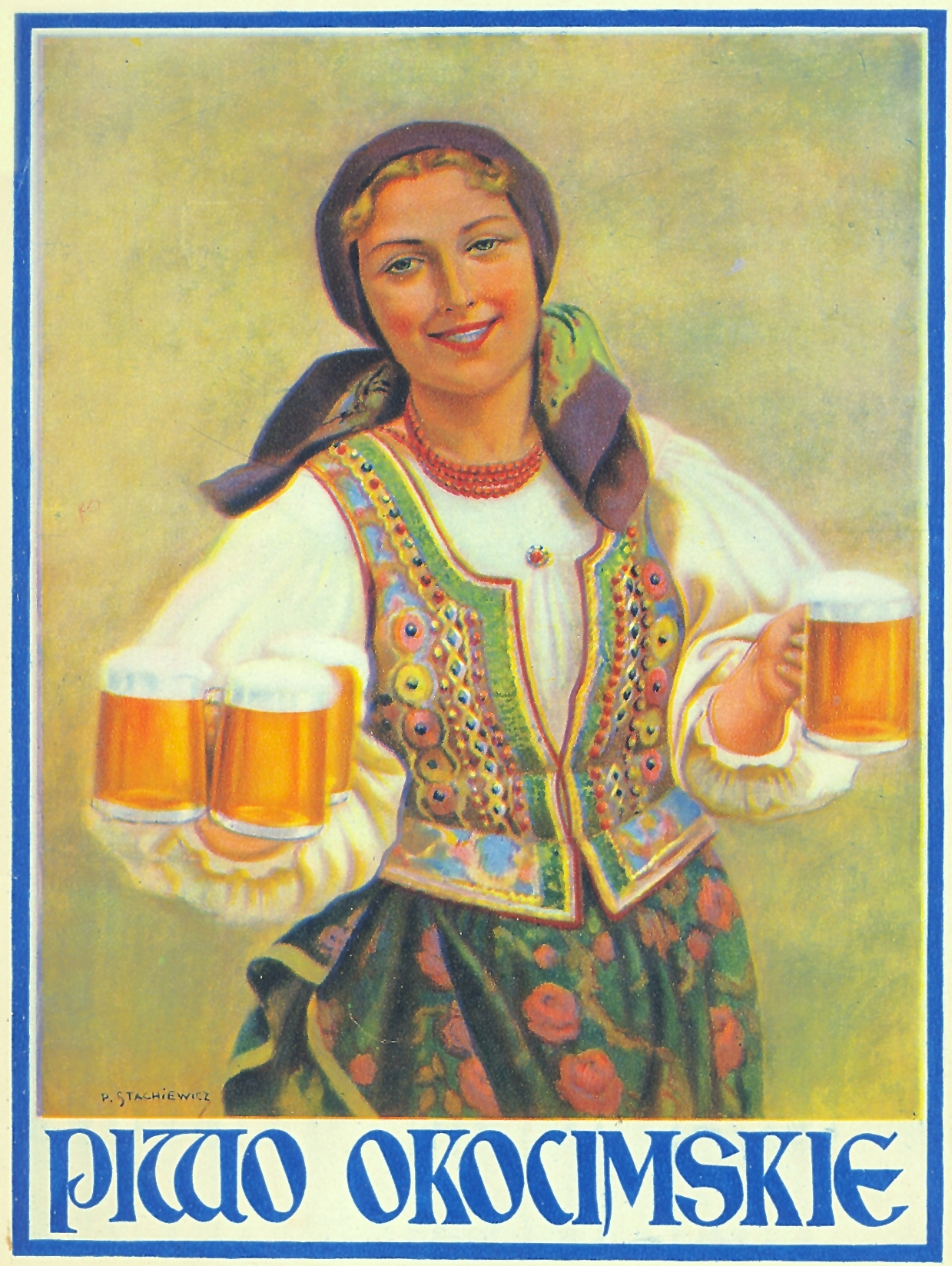
Advertisement for
Okocim Beer

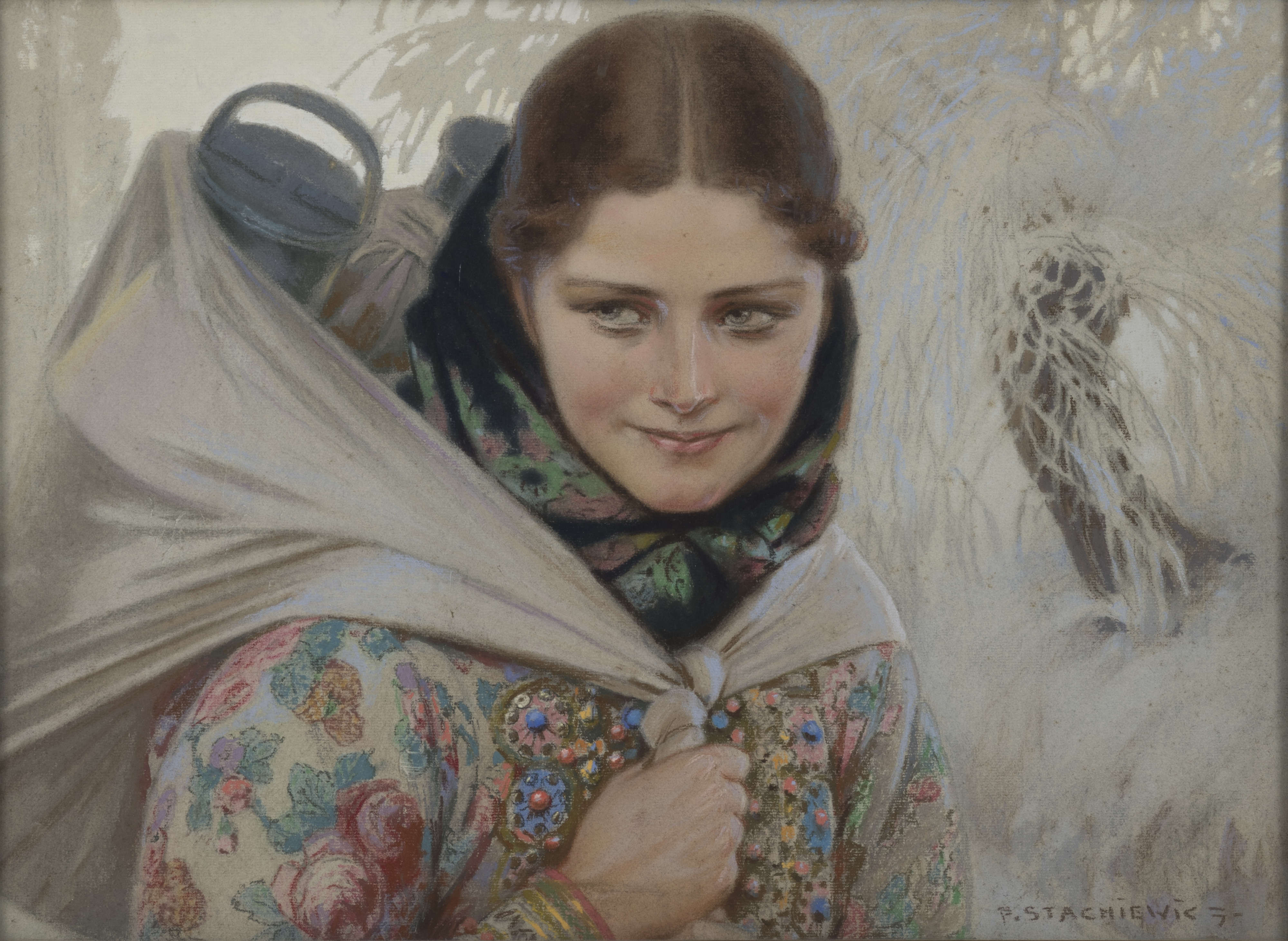
Milkmaid

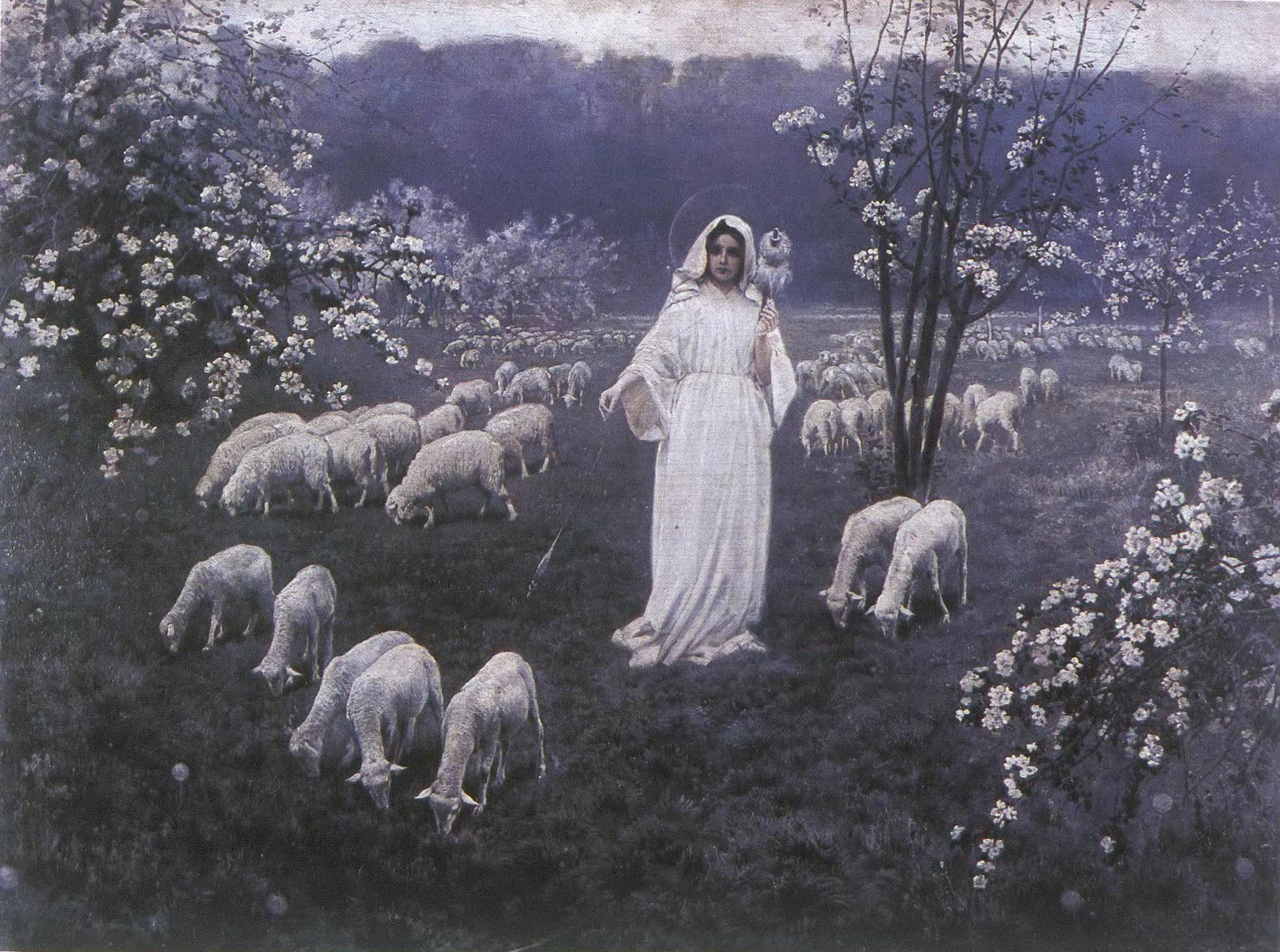
Legend of the Virgin Mary (Queen of Heaven) No.8

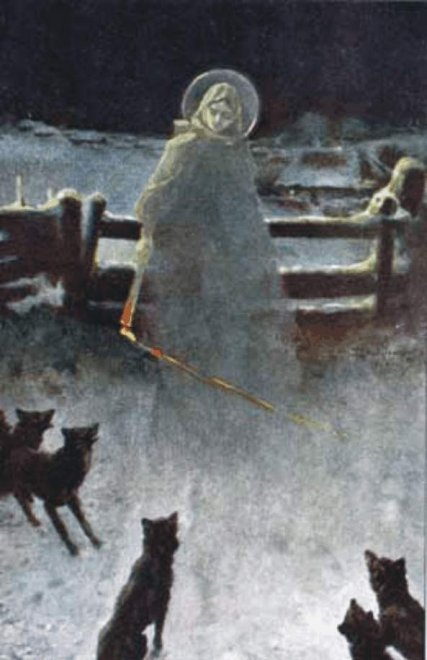
Postcard of
Our Lady of the Thunder Candle

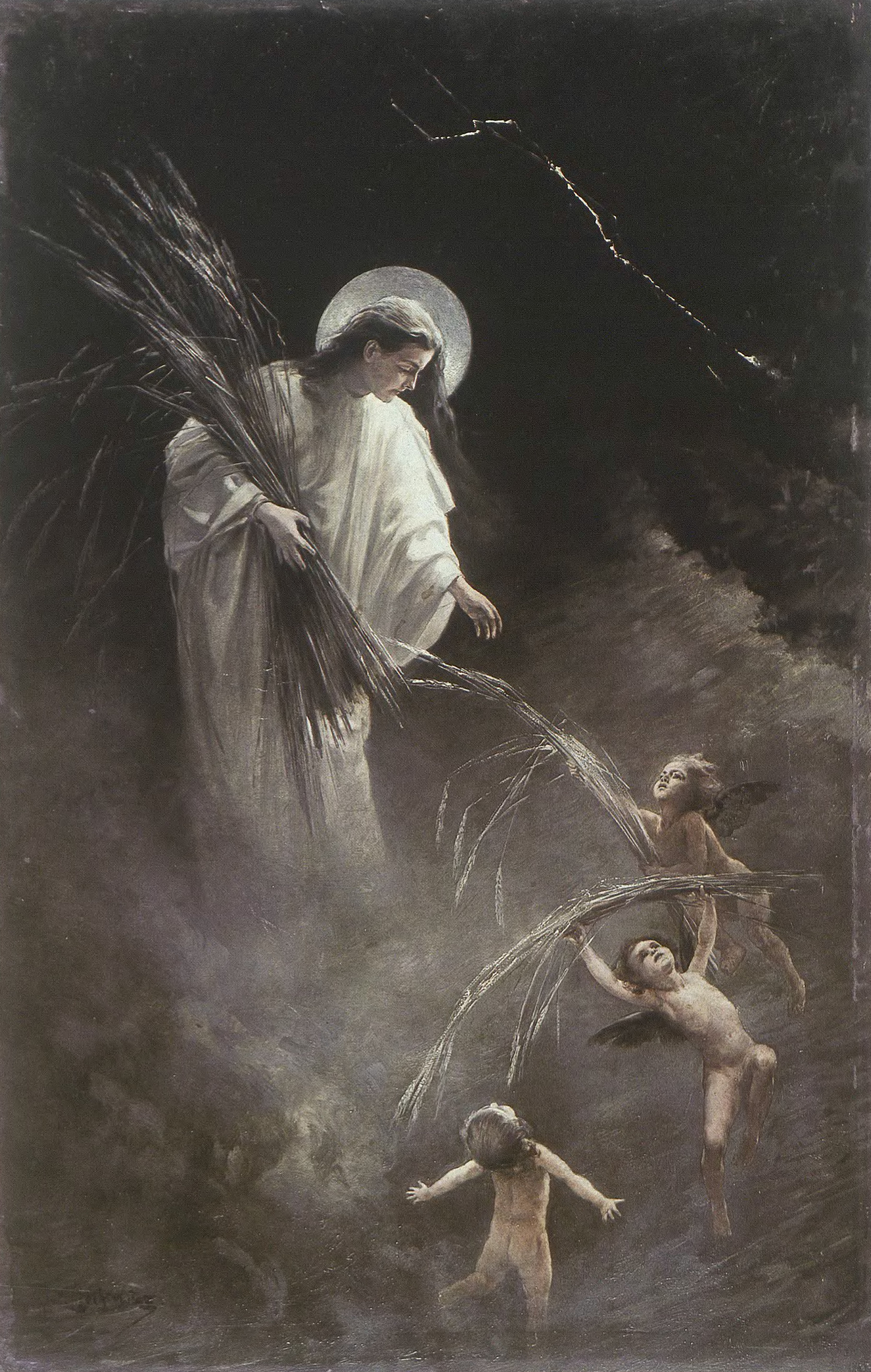
Legend of the Virgin Mary (Queen of Heaven) No. 3

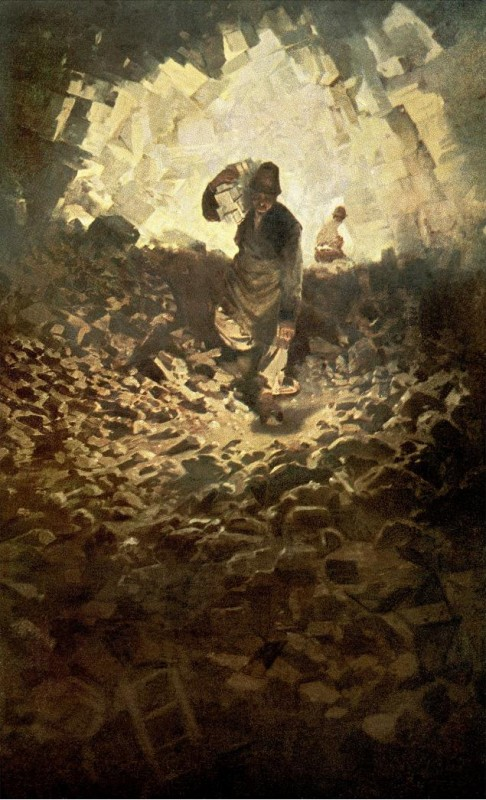
Crystal Grotto
(Wielicka Salt Mine)

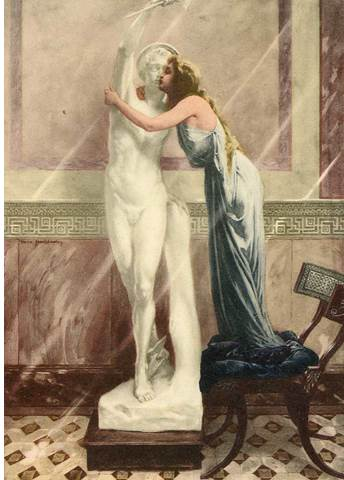
Eunice Kissing
a Statue of Petronius
(Quo Vadis)
