= Morawski =

Morawski (feminine: Morawska; plural: Morawscy) is a Polish surname. It is related to a number of surnames in other languages.

== Related surnames ==
Language	Masculine	Feminine
Polish	Morawski	Morawska
Belarusian (Romanization)	Мараўскі (Marauski, Maraŭski, Marawski)	Мараўская (Marauskaya, Marauskaia, Maraŭskaja)
Bulgarian (Romanization)	Моравски (Moravski)	Моравска (Moravska)
Czech/Slovak	Moravský	Moravská
Hungarian	Moravszki	
Latvian	Moravskis	Moravska
Lithuanian	Morauskas	Morauskienė (married); Morauskaitė (unmarried)
Romanian	Moravschi	
Russian (Romanization)	Моравский (Moravskiy, Moravsky, Moravski, Moravskij)	Моравская (Moravskaya, Moravskaia, Moravskaja)
Ukrainian (Romanization)	Моравський (Moravskyi, Moravskyy, Moravskyj)	Моравська (Moravska)
Other	Morawsky	

== People ==
=== Morawski/Morawska ===
- Adam Morawski (born 1994), Polish handball player
- Cezary Morawski (born 1954), Polish actor
- Edward Osóbka-Morawski (1909–1997), Polish politician
- Feliks Jan Szczęsny Morawski (1818–1898), Polish historian and painter
- Franciszek Morawski (1783–1861), Polish general
- Gabriela Morawska-Stanecka (born 1968), Polish politician
- Jan Morawski (1633–1700), Polish Jesuit and theological writer
- Kalikst Morawski (1859–1939), Polish chess master
- Kazimierz Morawski (philologist) (1852–1925), Polish philologist and historian
- Konrad Morawski (1913–1985), Polish actor
- Lidia Morawska, Polish-born Australian aerosol physicist
- Piotr Morawski (1976–2009), Polish mountaineer
- Ryszard Morawski (born 1933), Polish painter
- Seweryn Morawski (1819–1900), Polish Catholic bishop
- Witold Dzierżykraj-Morawski (1895–1944), Polish military commander

=== Other forms ===
- Gustav Pfleger Moravský (1833–1875), Czech author
- Joe Moravsky, American game show contestant
- Maria Moravskaya (1890–1947), Russian writer
- Moráuskienė, a marriage name of Elena Laumenskienė, Lithuanian composer, music educator, and pianist
