= Phryne (disambiguation) =

Phryne was a famous courtesan of Ancient Greece. Sometimes also Phryné in English.

Phryne may also refer to:

- Phryné (opera), an 1893 opéra comique by Camille Saint-Saëns
- Phryne (painting), an 1867 painting by Artur Grottger
- 1291 Phryne, a main-belt asteroid
- Phryne Fisher, a fictional detective
- Phryne Bubani, synonym for Sisymbrium L.
