= Stanisław Tarnowski (Biały) =

Polish painter

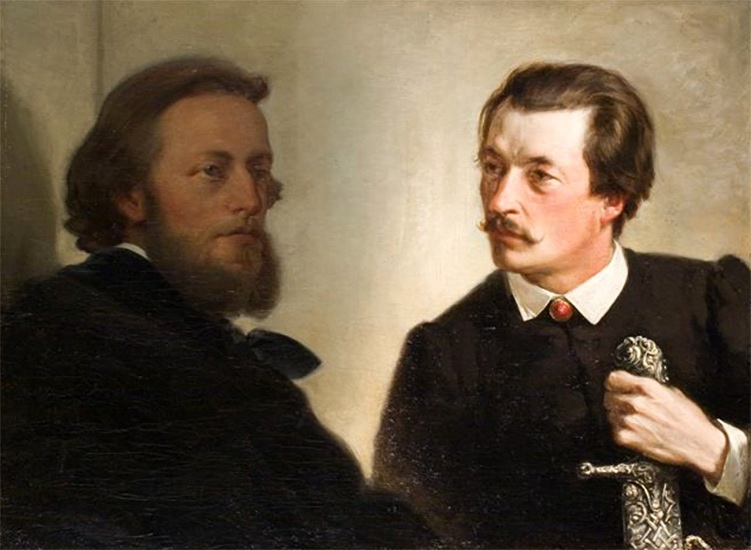
- Portrait of Władysław Tarnowski (left) and Stanisław Tarnowski (right) by Artur Grottger & Andrzej Grabowski, 1866 and 1872
- Born: Stanisław Tarnowski; May 8, 1838; Wróblewice
- Died: July 2, 1909 (aged 71); Śniatynka
- Education: He learnt from Jan Kanty Maszkowski, Maksymiliana Cercha, Leon Dembowski
- Known for: Painting, drawing
- Movement: History painting

Stanisław Tarnowski , known as Stanisław Tarnowski "Biały" (May 8, 1838 – July 2, 1909), was a Polish painter. He was known for landscapes and better as friend of Artur Grottger and model to his paintings.

== Youth ==
Stanisław Tarnowski was born on May 8, 1838. He was a son of Walerian Tarnowskiego and Ernestyna, brother of Władysław Tarnowski m.in., and cousin of Stanisław Tarnowski, called in youth "Czarny" ("Black"), later the Rector of Jagellonian University. When Stanisław "Biały" ("White") was called from colour of hair. Initially, he learnt with Jesuit College in Lvov together with brother; then, in Kraków under direction of Szymon Dutkiewicz; his father's relative Father Jan Scipio del Campo, and Wincenty Pol, in free moments he wandered through the neighbourhoods of Kraków and Tatras. Later, he studied in Kraków until the father's death and inheriting earthly estate, which he administered. He learnt drawing and painting with Jan Kanty Maszkowski (together with Artur Grottger), in Kraków with painter of architecture Maksymilian Cercha and landscapist Leon Dembowski. In 1856 and 1857 he had larger exhibitions in Kraków. Stanisław Tarnowski's paintings were to 1938 r. in possession his relatives, mainly in Śniatynka. After World War II Stanisław's paintings are in Polish museums, especially in National Museum in Kraków. In 1863, Stanisław fought in January Insurrection, among others in Battle of Radziwiłłów. After Insurrection, he more seldom depicted, but he stayed sensitive on beauty and became art collector.

=== Friendship and posing for paintings ===
Since early childhood Stanisław was friends with Artur Grottger, which later was frequent guest in Śniatynka. And many times Stanisław posed for his paintings.

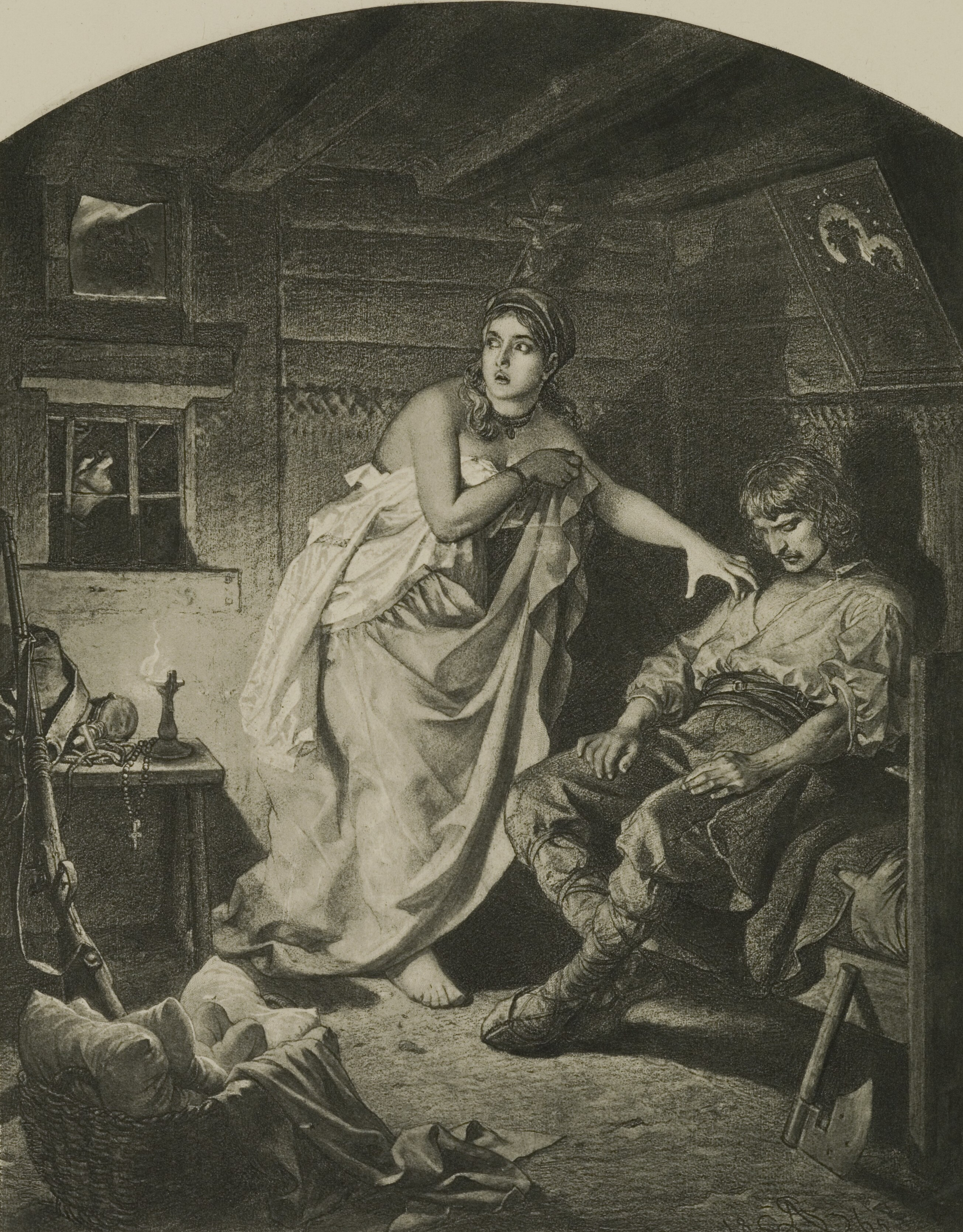
Omen (Znak (Cycle: Lituania, II), posed: Wanda Monné i Stanisław Tarnowski.)

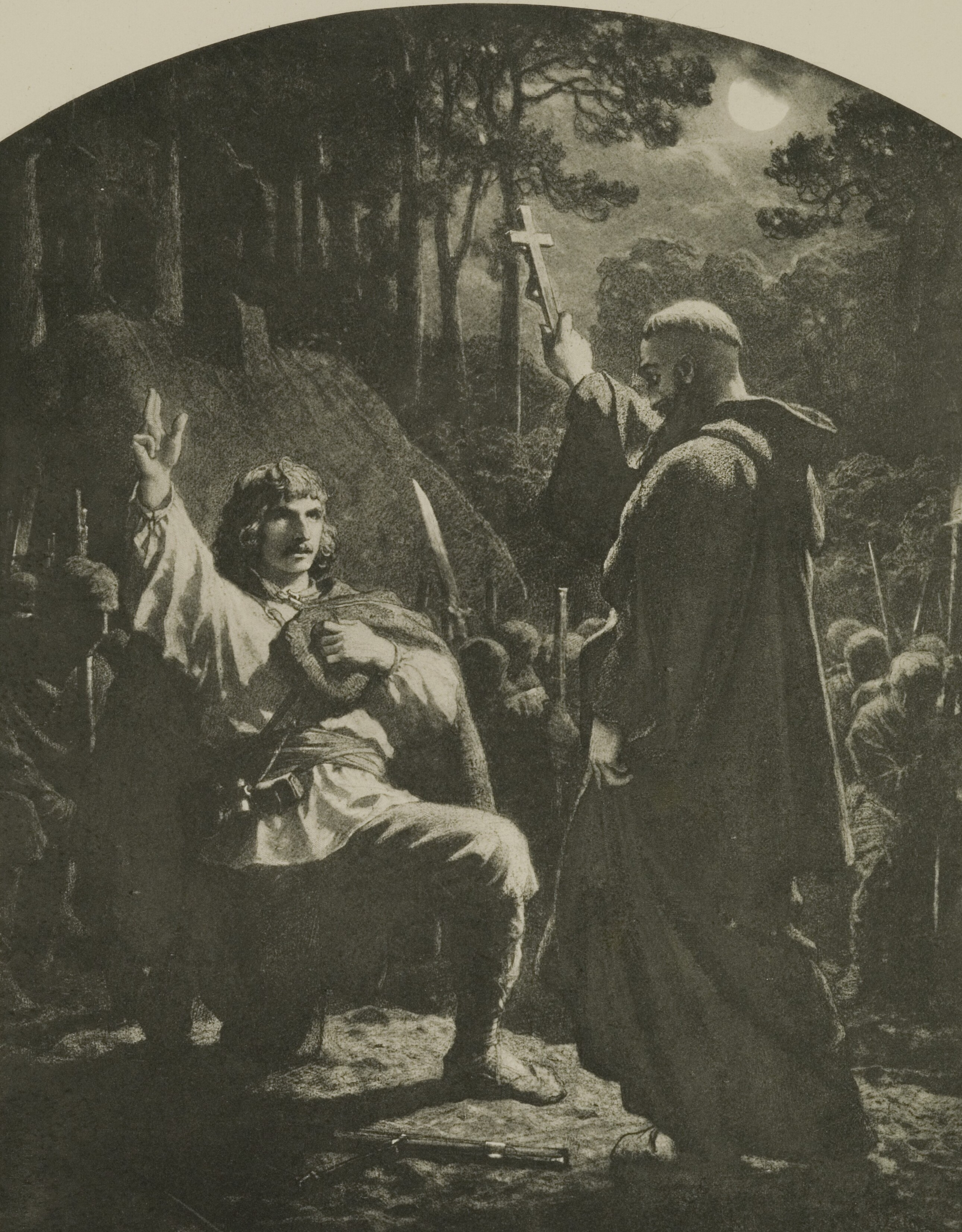
Oath (Przysięga (Cycle: Lituania, III), posed: Stanisław Tarnowski.)

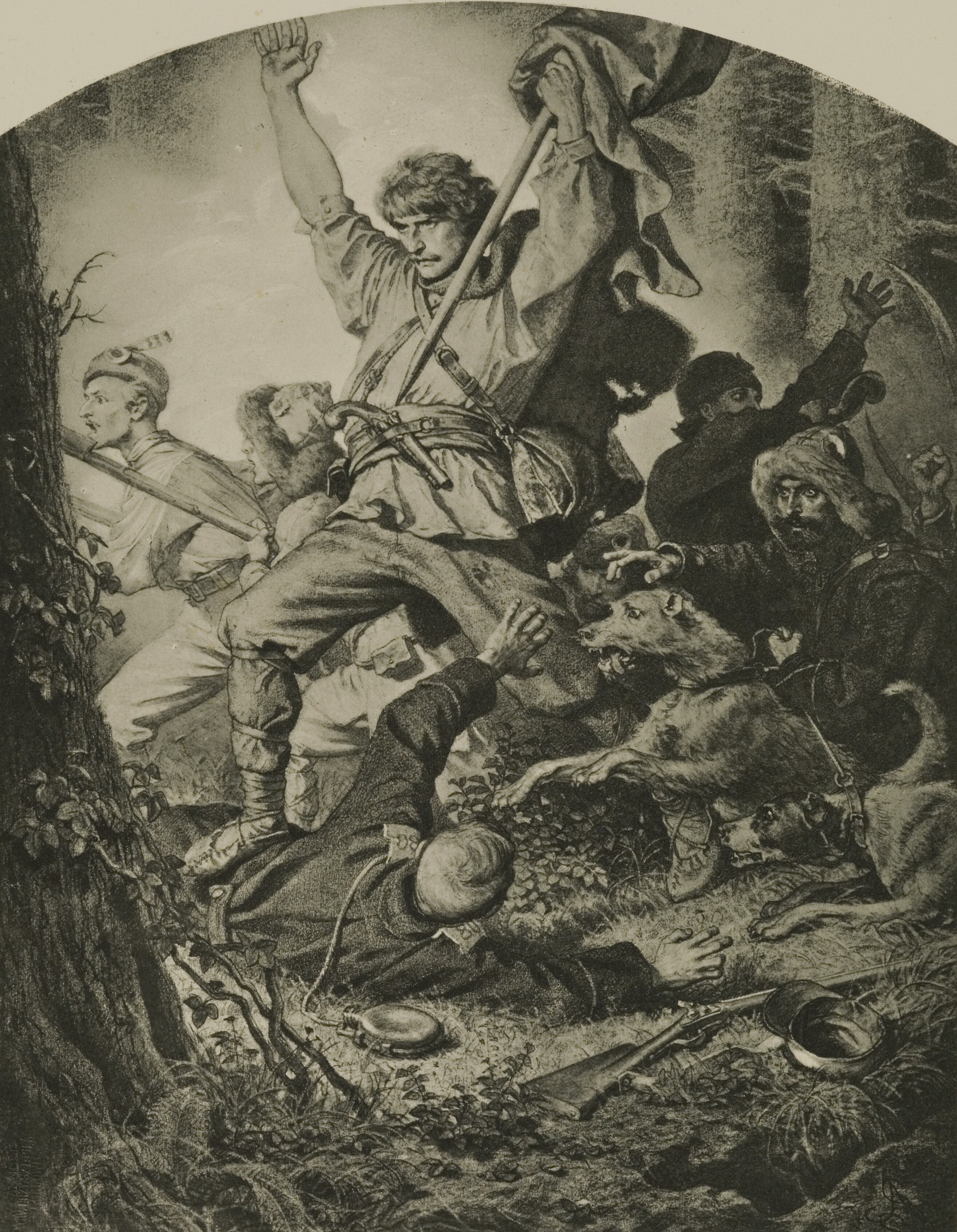
Combat ("Bój" (Cycle: Lituania, IV), posed: Grottger – in cap with feather, Tarnowski – with flag, and his brother-in-law Napoleon Sarnecki – with dogs.)

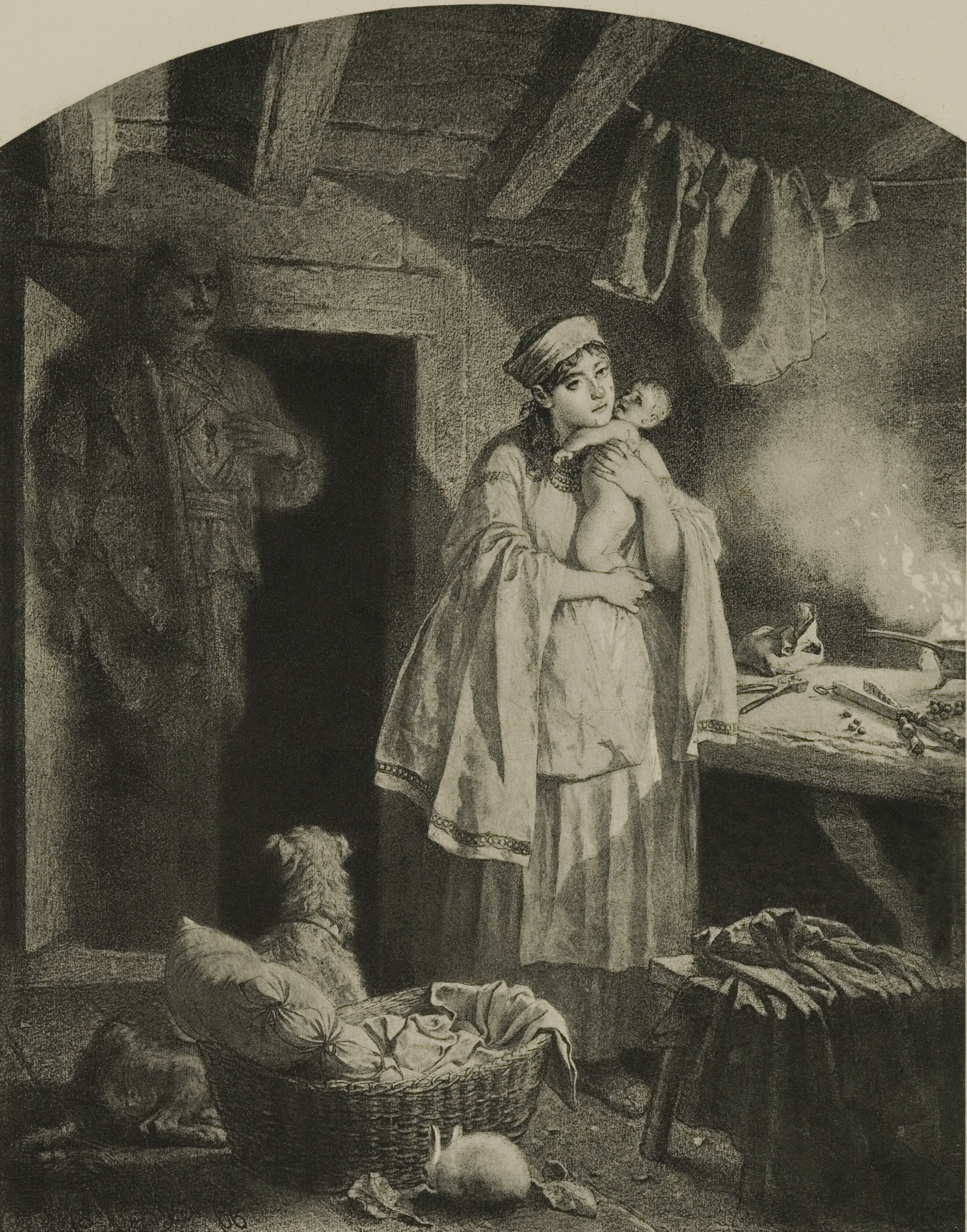
Ghost (Duch (Cycle:Lituania, V), posed: Wanda Monné and Stanisław Tarnowski.)

=== Political career ===
Stanisław Tarnowski was a member of parliament of Galicia and Lodomeria in 1883–95.

== Bibliography ==
=== Bibliography in German ===
- Z. Batowski "Tarnowski, Stanislaw" in: "Allgemeines Lexikon der Bildenden Künstler von der antike bis zur gegenwart", Begründet von Ulrich Triemi und Felix Becker unter mitwirkung von etwa 400 fachgelehrten bearbeitet und redigiert von H.. Vollmer, B. C. Kreplin, H. Wolff, O. Kellner; edited by Hans Vollmer, Vol. 32 (Stephens – Theodotos), publ. Von E. A. Seemann, Leipzig, 1938, p. 448.
- Saur "Allgemeines Künstlerlexikon Bio-bibliographischer Index A-Z", Vol. 9 (Schinz-Toricelli), Munich-Leipzig, 2000, p. 621.
- Jan Bołoz Antoniewicz "Katalog der retrospectiven Ausstellung polnischer Kunst 1764-1886"), Dyrekcyia Powszechnej Wystawy Krajowej, Lvov, 1894, pp. 320–321, position 1416.
- Jan Bołoz Antoniewicz "Kat. Wyst. szt. pol. 1764-1886" (auch dtsche Ausg.); ders., Grottger, Lemberg u. Warschau [1910].

=== Bibliography in Polish ===
- Emmanuel Świeykowski "Pamiętnik Towarzystwa Przyjaciół Sztuk Pięknych w Krakowie. 1854-1904 pięćdziesiąt lat działalności dla sztuki ojczystej.", (second edition), Towarzystwo Przyjaciół Sztuk Pięknych w Krakowie, Kraków, 1905, p. 539 and 164.
- Przegląd polski (Kraków), 173 (1909) 278f. (Obituary).
- Arthur i Wanda. "Listy-Pamiętniki", Vol. 1, p. 162 (ill.); 2, Medyka u. Lvov, 1928.
