= Borshchovychi =

Rural locality in Lviv Oblast, Ukraine

Coordinates: 49.8614°N 24.2778°E

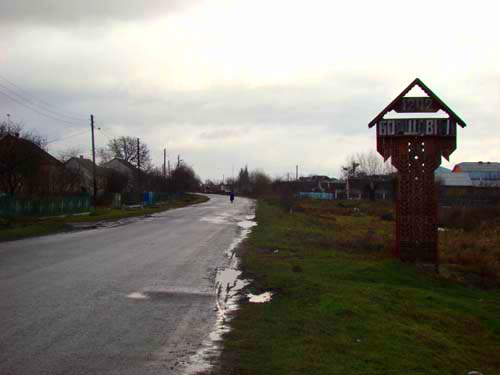

Borshchovychi (Ukrainian: Борщовичі, Polish: Barszczowice) is a village in Lviv Raion of Lviv Oblast in Ukraine. It belongs to Novyi Yarychiv settlement hromada, one of the hromadas of Ukraine. First mentioned in 1442 in court documents of the nearby city of Lviv.

== History ==
According to a 1564 census, the village was inhabited by 20 peasants and 3 innkeepers. Decimated by three successive Tartar raids in the 17th century, by 1665 the population dropped to merely 8 inhabitants. In 1721, the village was bought by Adam Mikołaj Sieniawski who intended to rebuild the village, however a severe famine in 1726 and 1727 forces him to cede the village to the mighty Potocki family in 1729. According to the 1765 census the village was inhabited by 64 families, there are numerous weavers shops, two distilleries, a brewery and an inn. Twenty years later the population of Barszczowice includes 108 peasants and 7 artisans.

Following the Partitions of Poland, the village along with the surrounding region became part of Austro-Hungarian Galicia. The 1820 census lists 127 houses in Barszczowice, including 15 in a nearby colony named Hołodówka and 7 in a colony named Chałupki. Around that time the village was acquired by Jan Maszkowski, a noted Polish painter, better known as the tutor of Juliusz Kossak, Artur Grottger and Henryk Rodakowski. His manor was often visited by some of the most notable Polish artists of the epoch.

On 12 July 1869 a train station of the Galician Railway of Archduke Charles Louis was opened in the village, bolstering its growth. Initially the village belonged to the Roman Catholic parish of Jaryczów with local Greek Catholics attending masses in nearby Pikułowice. However, in 1898 Zofia Siemieńska-Lewicka financed a construction of St. Mary's church, consecrated later the same year. According to the 1910 Austro-Hungarian census the village was inhabited by 2129 people, including 1705 Polish speakers, 424 Ukrainian speakers and 79 Jews. In the course of the brief Polish-Ukrainian War, the village was captured by Polish forces on 29 December 1918. Since then the village was part of Poland. In 1923 local Ukrainians built a small wooden Holy Trinity Church. Until 1928 the number of inhabitants rose to over 2400.

During World War II the village shared the history of nearby city of Lwów: it was first annexed by the Soviet Union as part of its pact with Nazi Germany, then captured by the Nazis during the Operation Barbarossa. Although far from Ukrainian-populated areas, the village was targeted by the Ukrainian Insurgent Army raids during the Massacres of Poles in Volhynia and Eastern Galicia, which started an exodus of local inhabitants. In 1945 most remaining Poles are forcibly evicted and resettled further west, while the village was repopulated with Ukrainians.

After the war the village was annexed by the Soviet Union, renamed to its modern Ukrainian name and attached to the Ukrainian SSR. The church was confiscated by the communist authorities and turned into a branch of the Lviv Historical Museum. Since the dissolution of the USSR it is part of independent Ukraine. In the early 1990s the church was refurbished and donated to the Greek Catholic community.

Until 18 July 2020, Borshchovychi belonged to Pustomyty Raion. The raion was abolished in July 2020 as part of the administrative reform of Ukraine, which reduced the number of raions of Lviv Oblast to seven. The area of Pustomyty Raion was merged into Lviv Raion.

== Notable people ==
Among the people born in the village are:

- Edmund Cieczkiewicz, Polish painter (born 1872)
- Jan Bukowski, Polish artist (born 1873)
- Stasiv Ostap, Ukrainian physicist (born 1903)
- Bohdan Stashynsky, Soviet assassin (born 1931)
