= Franciszek Tepa =

Polish artist

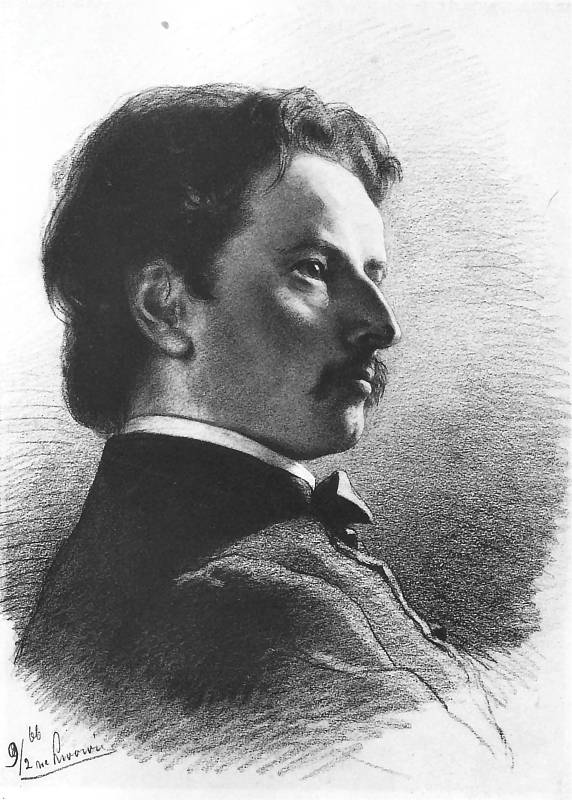
- Franciszek Tepa, 1866; portrait by Artur Grottger
- Born: 17 September 1829; Lwów
- Died: 23 December 1889 (aged 60); Lwów
- Education: Akademia Stanowa; Academy of Fine Arts Vienna (1847-1848)
- Movement: Orientalist

Franciszek Tomasz Tepa (17 September 1829, in Lwów – 23 December 1889, in Lwów) was a Polish mid-19th century realist painter who specialized in portraits and Orientalist themes. During the Revolutions of 1848 (also known as the Spring of Nations), Tepa became politically involved in the independence movement. He produced a series of portraits of Polish leaders of the November Uprising against the foreign Partitions of Poland including Joachim Lelewel, Józef Dwernicki and Józef Chłopicki among many others; and was jailed as political prisoner while in the Austro-Hungarian capital of Vienna.

== Biography ==
His father was a confectioner. He began his artistic studies at the "Akademia Stanowa" with Jan Maszkowski from 1842 to 1844, later attending the Academy of Fine Arts Vienna from 1847 to 1848, where he studied with Ferdinand Waldmüller; the Academy of Fine Arts, Munich from 1849 to 1852, where his teacher was Wilhelm Kaulbach; and the École nationale supérieure des Beaux-Arts from 1854 to 1860, under Ary Scheffer and Léon Cogniet. While in Vienna, he participated in the Revolutions of 1848.

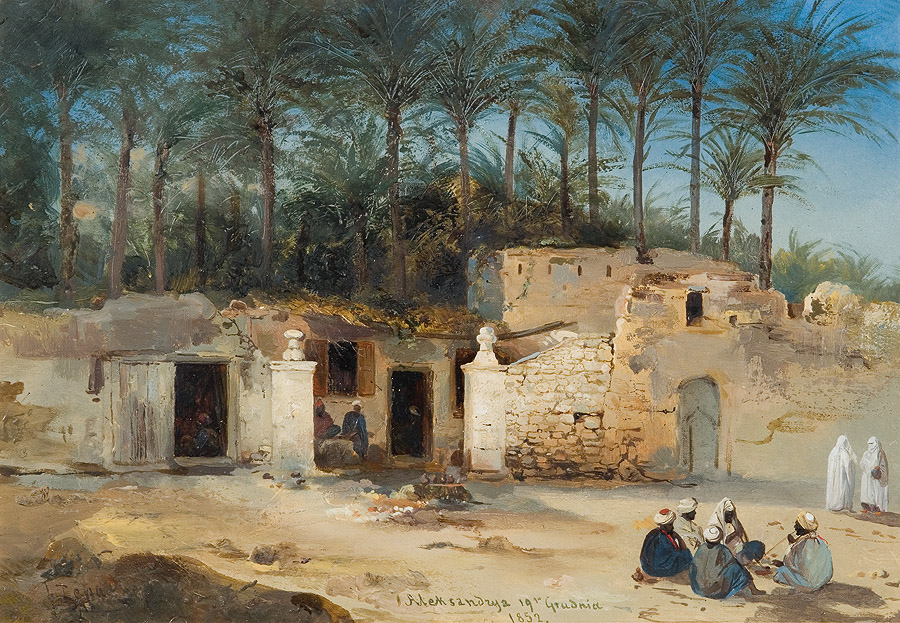
In Egypt (Near Alexandria, 1852)

In 1852, together with Galician separatist Adam Józef Potocki, his wife, and the journalist Maurycy Mann, Tepa took a trip through Greece, Egypt and Palestine which resulted in some of the first examples of Polish Orientalism. He also brought back some antiquities that were later displayed in the Ossolineum.

Upon his return from Paris in 1860, he settled permanently in Lwów, where he produced studies of the local folk-life and landscapes on behalf of Count Włodzimierz Dzieduszycki, a founder of the "State Museum of Natural History". During this time, he was offered a Professorship at the Kraków Academy of Fine Arts, but refused because of his desire to remain in Lwów.

He specialized in portraits, becoming well known for his miniatures painted on ivory, and gave some lessons. One of his best-known students was Franciszek Żmurko. Many of his works remained in Lwów (Lviv) when the area passed to Ukrainian control after World War II.

== See also ==
- List of Orientalist artists
- Orientalism
