= Edmund Cieczkiewicz =

Polish painter and graphic designer

Edmund Cieczkiewicz (1872–1958) was a Polish painter and graphic designer. Best known for his Romantic landscapes, he is often dubbed "the last student of Matejko".

Born in Barszczowice near Lwów (modern Lviv, then in Austro-Hungarian Galicia), Cieczkiewicz graduated from a gymnasium in Nowy Sącz and in 1887 joined the Kraków Academy of Fine Arts. There he studied painting under the tutelage of Florian Cynk, Władysław Łuszczkiewicz and Leon Wyczółkowski, as well as Jan Matejko and Teodor Axentowicz. He graduated in 1898, along his better-known colleagues: Józef Mehoffer, Stanisław Wyspiański, Xawery Dunikowski and Wojciech Weiss.

Although a skilled painter, his personal situation prevented him from devoting his life solely to art. Instead upon graduation he started working for Imperial Royal Austrian State Railways as a railway clerk. He continued to paint though, notably portraits and mountain landscapes of the Beskids and Tatra Mountains, as well as Volhynia and Białowieża Forest.

Among the best-known of his works are a series of paintings adorning the train stations of Tarnów and Nowy Sącz (finished around 1910). The Imperial Royal Austrian State Railways were so impressed with the series that it ordered a similar series of Alpine landscapes for the Salzburg Hauptbahnhof, however the outbreak of World War I prevented their completion. Apart from paintings, Cieczkiewicz also painted a series of promotional posters for the 1929 Polish General Exhibition in Poznań (1929) and numerous postcards.

After the war Cieczkiewicz retired and settled in Wierchomla before moving to Kamionka Wielka, Piwniczna and finally to Rytro, where he spent the remainder of his life. He died 31 January 1958 in Rytro and was buried at the local Catholic cemetery.
