= Maximilian Cercha =

Polish painter and drawer

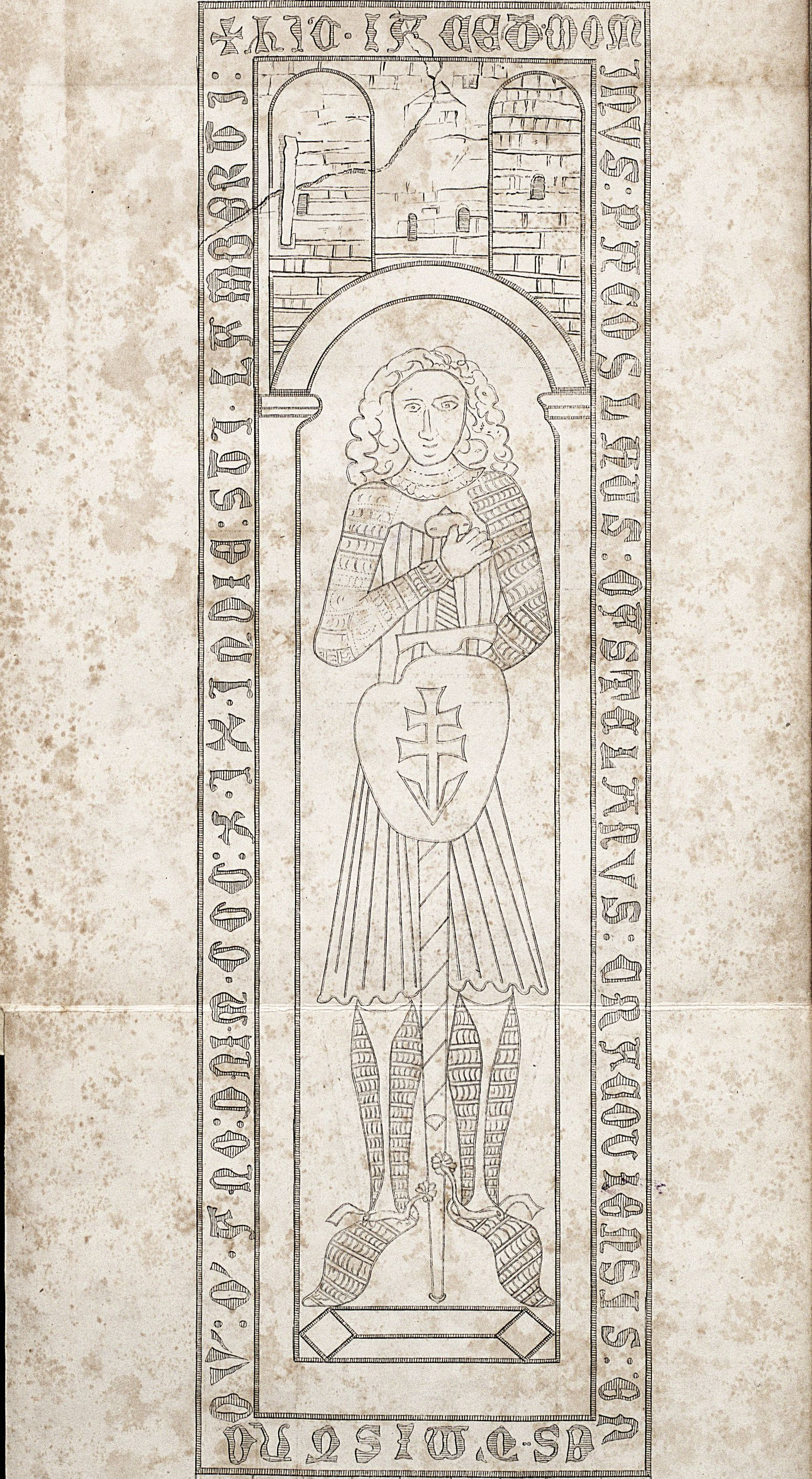
- Pakosław z Mstyczowa; Lithograph by Maximilian Cercha
- Born: 12 October 1818; Kraków
- Died: 29 June 1907 (aged 88); Kraków
- Burial place: Rakowicki Cemetery
- Occupations: painter drawer

Maximilian (also spelled Maksymilian) Cercha (1818–1907) was a Polish painter and drawer. He was the nephew of Ezechiel Cercha (1790–1820) and the father of Stanisław Cercha (1867–1919).

== Life ==
Cercha was born on 12 October 1818 in Kraków. He studied at the Jan Matejko Academy of Fine Arts and at the Painting and Drawing School at the Technical Institute in Kraków with Karol Ceptowski, Jan Nepomucen Głowacki and Wojciech Stattler.

Cercha died in Kraków on 29 June 1907 and was buried at the Rakowicki Cemetery. Among Cercha's students are his son, Stanisław Cercha, and Stanisław Tarnowski.
