= Feliks Jan Szczęsny Morawski =

Polish historian, writer, painter and ethnographer

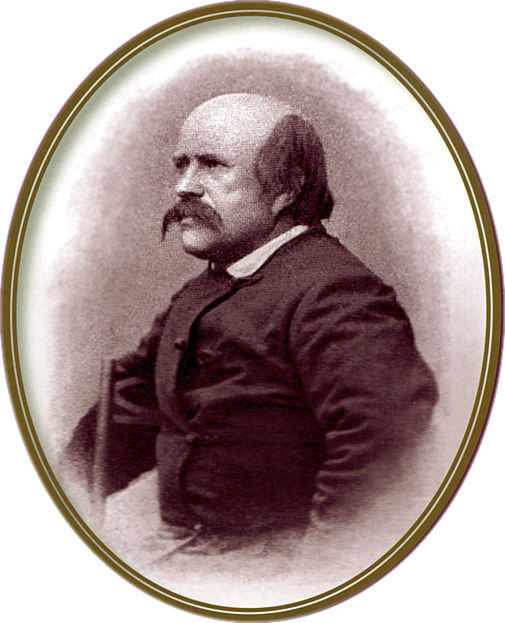
Feliks Jan Szczęsny Morawski (date unknown)

Feliks Jan Szczęsny Morawski (15 May 1818, in Rzeszów – 10 April 1898, in Stary Sącz) was a Polish historian, writer, painter and ethnographer.

== Biography ==
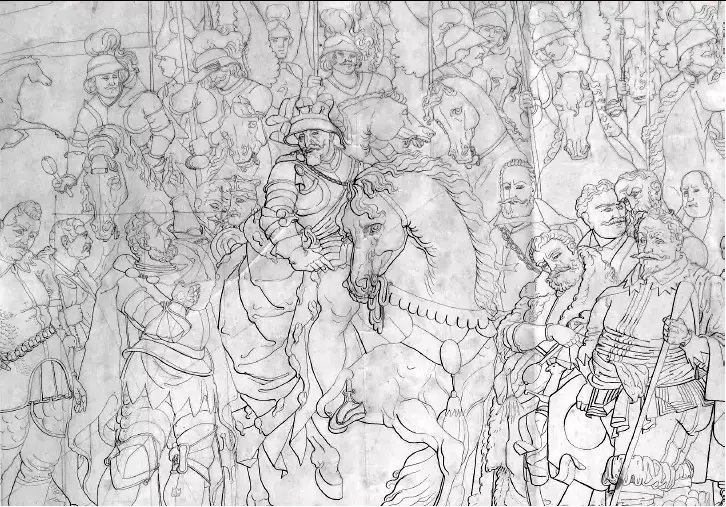
Zebrzydowski's Apology (sketch)

He studied painting with Jan Maszkowski in Lwów. Then, from 1839 to 1841, he attended the Academy of Fine Arts in Vienna. After returning to Lwów, he was appointed Curator of the art collections at the Ossolineum. During this time, he travelled throughout Galicia, drawing historical sites and objects. Later, he painted portraits and genre scenes, as well as some religious works. This included a depiction of the Holy Trinity at the Holy Trinity Church in Rzeszów.

Among his first writings were numerous articles and entries for the 28 volume set of Orgelbrand's Universal Encyclopedia, published from 1859 to 1868.

He also wrote dissertations on art, history and antiquity. His first monograph was on Stary Sącz: Sądecczyzna and was a fundamental source of information for researchers of the region. His other best known work was an historical novel, about the Bar Confederation. Some of his other titles are; Arianie polscy (Polish Arians), concerning the fate of the Polish Brethren, Pogórze Karpackie (The Carpathian Foothills), Pra-Sławianie i pra-Łotwa (Pre-Slavs and Pre-Latvians), Świat boży i życie na nim (God's World and Life on It), and Wyrazy fenickie w mowie polskiej (Phoenician Words in Polish Speech).

His interest in history made him a staunch patriot. During the Revolutions of 1848, he was a member of the National Guard, and he participated in the January Uprising.

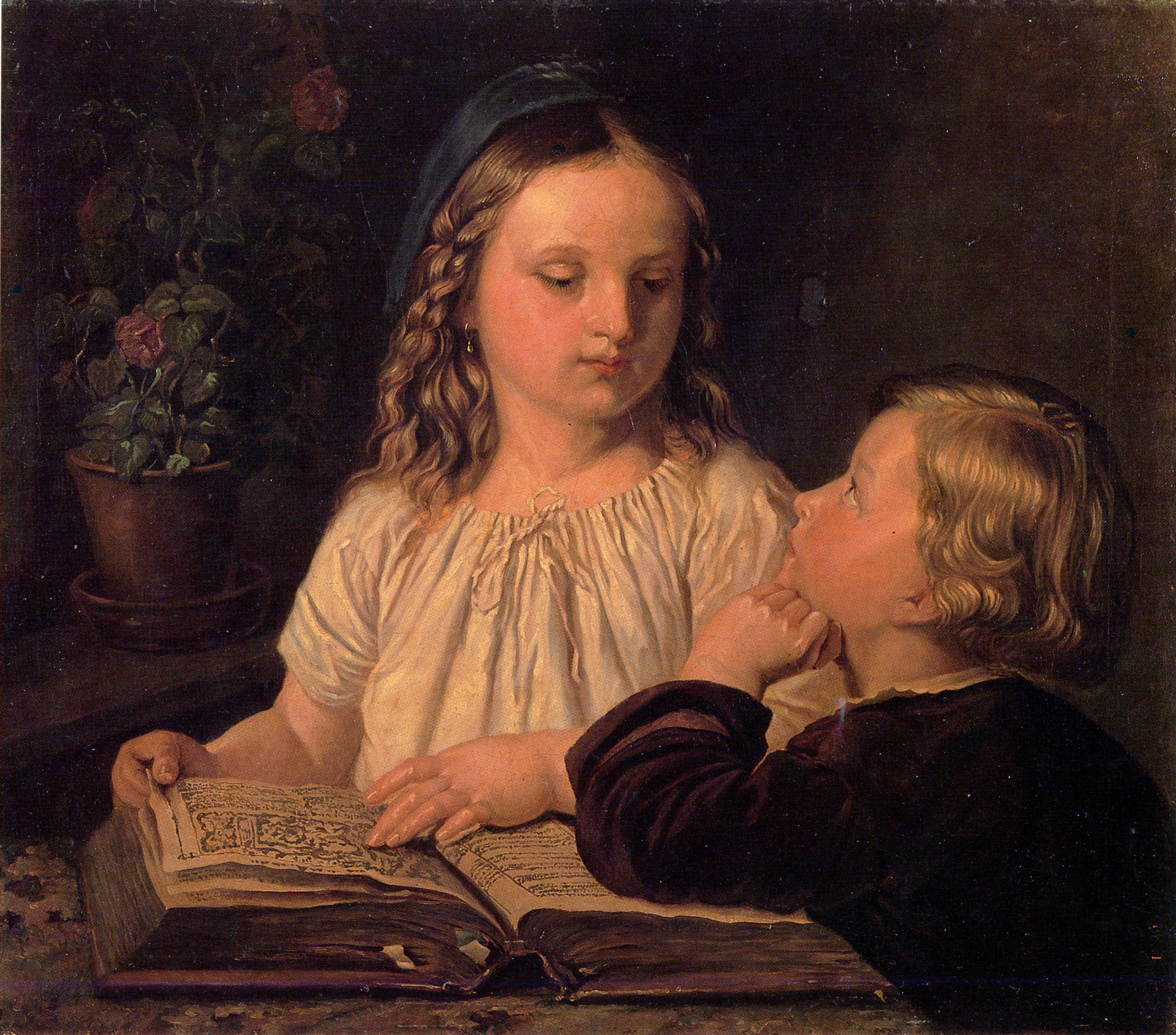
Children Reading a Book

== Selected works ==
- Pobitna pod Rzeszowem : Powieść prawdziwa z czasów Konfederacji Barskiej z roku 1769 (Pobitna near Rzeszów: A True Novel from the Times of the Bar Confederation in 1769), 1864; reprinted by Pobitno-Wydawnictwo, 2004 ISBN 978-83-919233-8-2 (Google Books)
- Sądecczyzna, 2 Vols, self-published; Vol. 1 (1863) (Google Books), Vol.2, "Sądecczyzna During Jagiellonian Times" (1865), (Google Books)
