= Ryszard Morawski =

Polish painter (1933–2023)

Ryszard Morawski (2 March 1933 – 29 August 2023) was a Polish artist. He was a painter (battle painting, historical uniforms and equipment), illustrator, toy designer and sculptor of tin figures.

== Life and career ==
Morawski was born in Warsaw on 2 March 1933. He studied painting under Michał Bylina and Antoni Trzeszczkowski at the Academy of Fine Arts in Warsaw.

Morawski died on 29 August 2023, at the age of 90.

== Publications ==
Books

- Ryszard Morawski, Henryk Wielecki: Wojsko Księstwa Warszawskiego. Kawaleria (1992, ISBN 8311079560)
- Ryszard Morawski, Henryk Wielecki: Wojsko Księstwa Warszawskiego. Generalicja, sztaby (1996, ISBN 8311085110)
- Ryszard Morawski, Andrzej Nieuważny: Wojsko Księstwa Warszawskiego. Artyleria, inżynierowie, saperzy (2004, ISBN 8385314180; 2011, ISBN 9788361229025)
- Ryszard Morawski, Adam Paczuski: Wojsko Księstwa Warszawskiego. Ułani, gwardie honorowe, pospolite ruszenie, żandarmeria konna. Tom I-II (2009, ISBN 9788361229032)
- Ryszard Morawski, Adam Paczuski: Wojsko Księstwa Warszawskiego. Piechota, gwardie narodowe, weterani. Tom I-II (2014, ISBN 9788361229056)
- Ryszard Morawski, Sławomir Leśniewski: Wojsko polskie w służbie Napoleona. Legia Nadwiślańska. Lansjerzy Nadwiślańscy. (2008, ISBN 9788361229001)
- Ryszard Morawski, Andrzej Nieuważny: Wojsko polskie w służbie Napoleona. Gwardia: szwoleżerowie, Tatarzy, eklererzy, grenadierzy. (2008, ISBN 9788361229018)
- Ryszard Morawski, Andrzej Dusiewicz: Wojsko polskie w służbie Napoleona. Legiony Polskie we Włoszech. Legia Naddunajska. Legia Polsko-Włoska. Legia Północna. (2010, ISBN 9788361229049)

Postcards

- Ryszard Morawski. Mundur polski 1797–1815. Warsaw 2010 (90 postcards in 10 separate cases, 14,8 x 10,4 cm)
- Ryszard Morawski: Józef Antoni Poniatowski 1763–1813; publikacja pamiątkowa z okazji 200-lecia śmierci księcia Józefa A. Poniatowskiego. Warsaw 2012 (12 postcards, 21 x 14,8 cm)
- Ryszard Morawski. Napoleon Bonaparte i jego dzielni dowódcy. Warsaw 2016 (9 postcards, 14,8 x 10,4 cm)

Calendars

- Ryszard Morawski. Wojsko Księstwa Warszawskiego. Kawaleria [calendar] 1992
- Ryszard Morawski. Poniatowski i inni [calendar] 2013

== Reviews ==
- Maciej Rosalak: Śladem ułanów i szwoleżerów. Uważam Rze HISTORIA, nr 9 December 2012 p. 92-93
- Michał Karpowicz: Karabela w mundurze. Za mundurem panny sznurem – może to znowu ma sens. W sieci Historii, no. 4 (11) April 2014
- Allan Chappet: L’armée du duché de Varsovie. RSN Reuve du Souvenir Napoléonien no. 490 p. 63
- Allan Chappet: La Légion Polonaise. RSN Reuve du Souvenir Napoléonien no. 491 p. 68
- Allan Chappet: L’armée du duché de Varsovie. RSN Reuve du Souvenir Napoléonien no. 499 p. 59
- Markus Stein: Rezension: Polnische Truppen der Napoleonischen Zeit
