= Jan Kanty Maszkowski =

Polish painter (1794–1865)

Jan Maszkowski
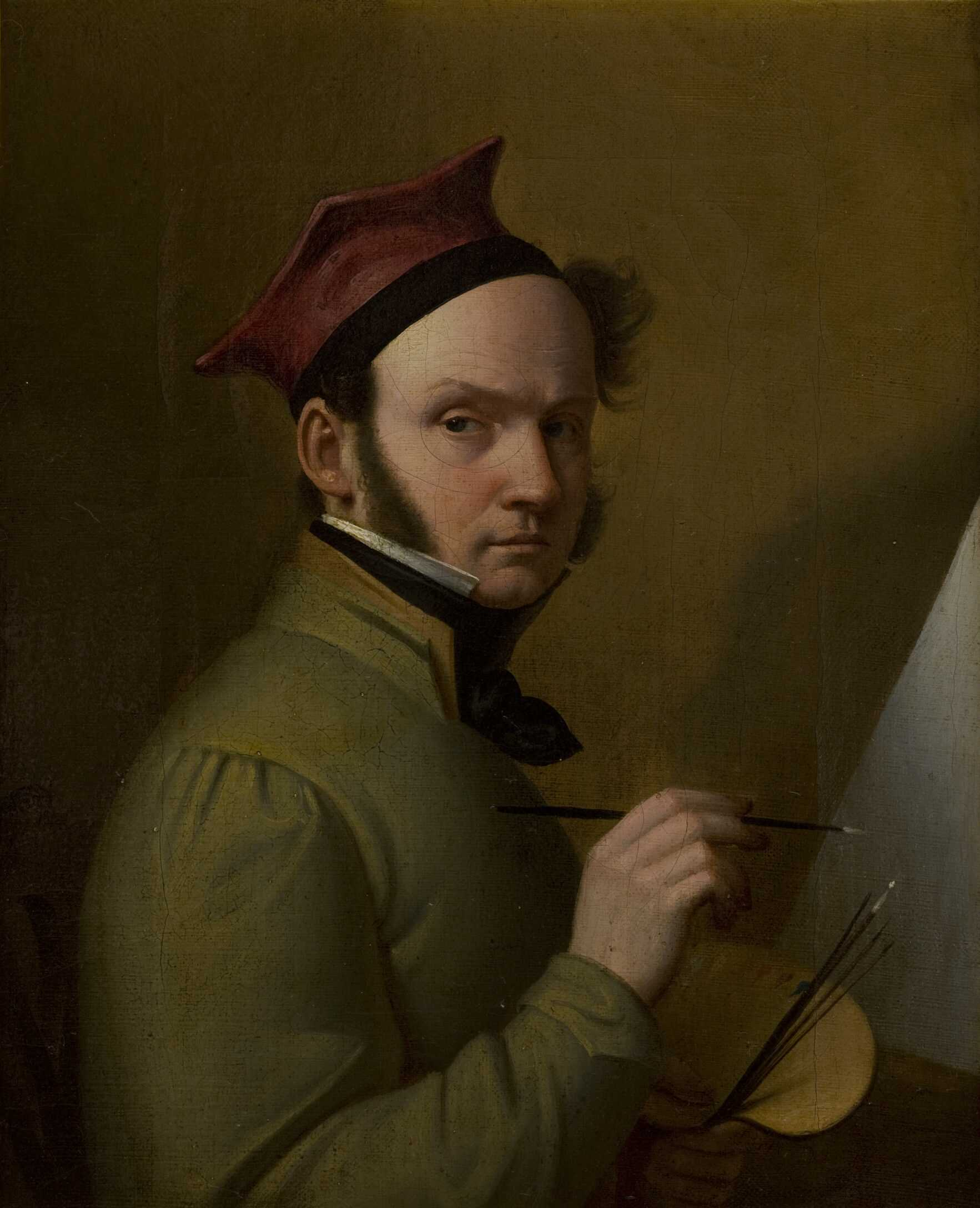
- Self-portrait (c.1830)
- Born: Jan Kanty Ignacy Maszkowski; 16 October 1794; Chorostków
- Died: 20 October 1865; Barszczowice, Austrian Empire
- Education: Academy of Fine Arts Vienna under Heinrich Füger and Johann Baptist von Lampi.
- Known for: Painting
- Movement: Portrait, History painting, Genre painting, Religious painting

Jan Kanty Ignacy Maszkowski (1794–1865) was a Polish painter; known for portraits, history and genre paintings.

== Life and work ==
He displayed artistic skills from an early age. A local landowner named Jozef Levitzky took note and helped him enroll in the School of Drawing at the University of Lviv, where he studied from 1813 to 1818, under the pastellist, Józef Buisset (1776-1832). He then spent three years at the Academy of Fine Arts in Vienna. His primary instructors there were Heinrich Füger and Johann Baptist von Lampi.

This was followed by studies in Rome, at the Accademia di San Luca, While there, he also visited Naples, Florence and Venice. In 1824 his patron, Levitzky, demanded that he return home, which he did, after a brief stay in Vienna. Once there, he focused on painting portraits and genre scenes in Volhynia and Podolia, and had his own workshop in Dubno.

From 1834 to 1843, he taught drawing at his alma mater, the university. When they closed the drawing school, he established his own school of painting at his workshop in Lviv. His pupils included Artur Grottger, Juliusz Kossak, Feliks Jan Szczęsny Morawski, Aleksander Raczyński, Henryk Rodakowski, Stanisław Tarnowski, Franciszek Tepa, and his son Marceli Maszkowski.

He died at his home in Barszczowice, a few days after his seventy-first birthday.

== Family ==
In addition to Marceli, he had two other sons; Karol, a mathematician and Rector at Lviv Polytechnic, and Rafał, a violinist and conductor. He also had three daughters: Franciszka, Fryderyka and Joanna. The painter and poster designer, Karol Zyndram Maszkowski, was his grandson.

== Works ==
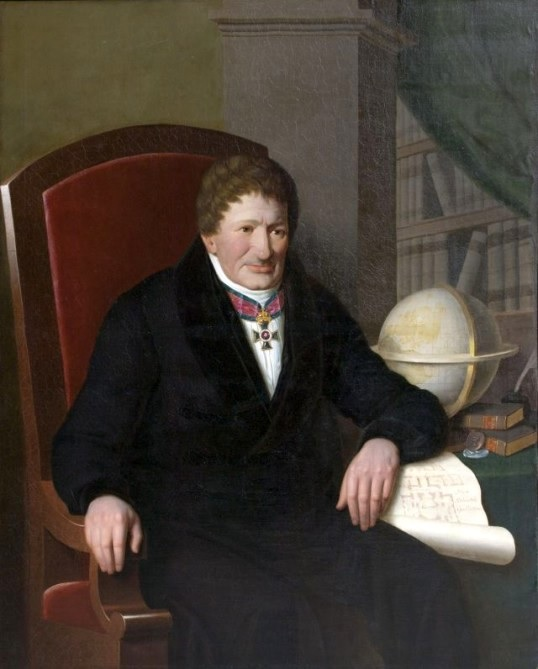
Józef Maksymilian Ossoliński (1843)

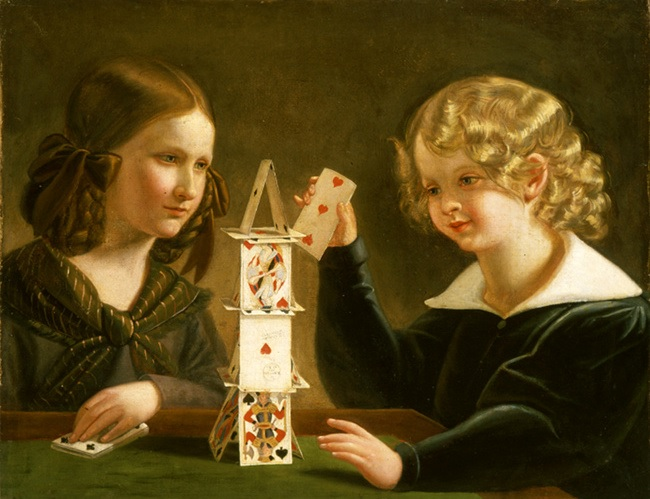
Little house of cards (Portrait of Fryderyka and Rafał Maszkowski), (before 1850).

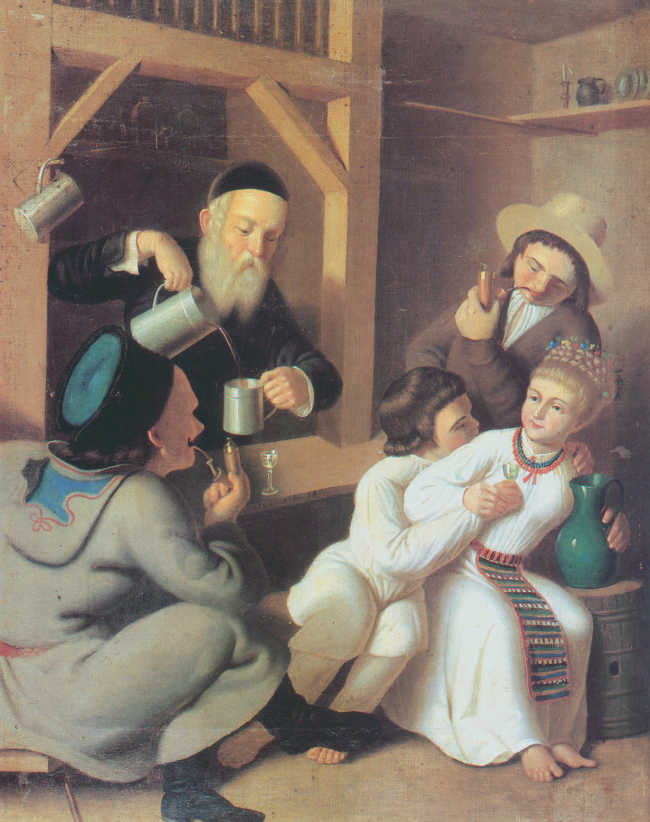
In a tavern in Podolia, (before 1865).

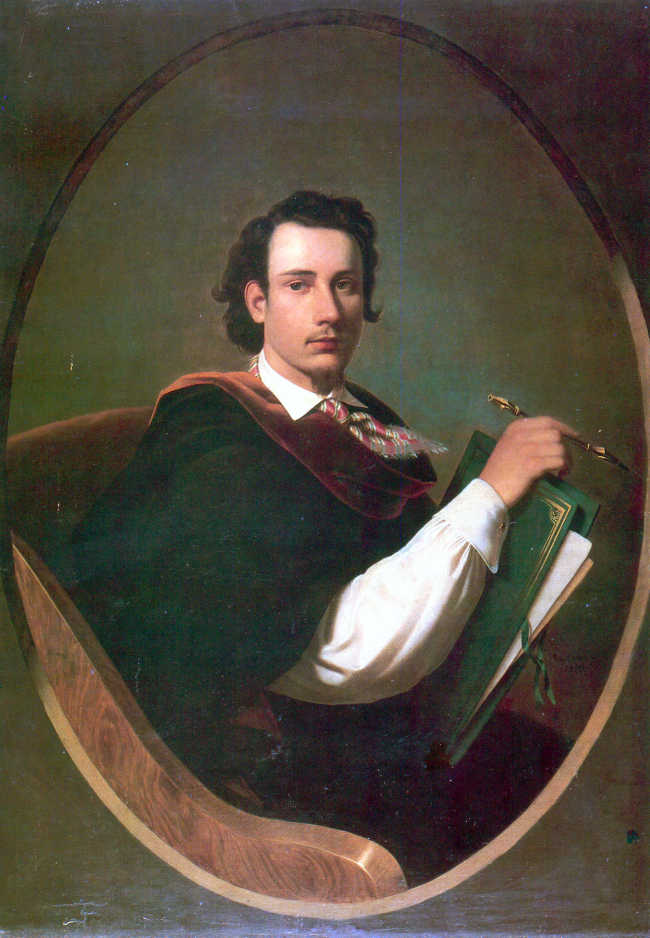
Marceli Maszkowski, (before 1865).

The works of Jan Maszkowski may be seen in the National Museum, Kraków, the National Museum, Wrocław, the Ossolineum, and several museums in Ukraine.
Portraits:

- Portrait of Francis I (Portret Franciszka I, 1834)
- Portrait of count Olizar (Portret hr. Olizara)
- Portrait of landscapist A. Lange, (Portret pejzażysty A. Lange, 1837)
- Portrait of Józef Maksymilian Ossoliński
- Little house of cards (Portrait of Fryderyka and Rafał Maszkowski), before 1850
- Portrait of young man (Portret młodego meżczyzny, 1848);
- Portrait of Marceli Maszkowski, his son (1856);
- Woman's portrait in white bonnet (Portret kobiety w białym czepku, 1840, in National Museum in Warsaw)

Historical paintings:

- Dalila cutting off hair of Samson, (Dalila ucinająca włosy Samsonowi, 1820–1824)
- Bolesław Chrobry in Kiev (Bolesław Chrobry w Kijowie)
- Jan III Sobieski, (1835);
- Portrait of Władysław IV king of Poland, (Władysław IV, król Polski)
- Self-portrait in square-topped cap (Autoportret w konfederatce, 1840);
- Defence of Trembowla, (Obrona Trembowli, 1848);
- Chrzanowska in Defence of Trembowla, (Chrzanowska w obronie Trembowli, 1820–1824)
- Dress of Jan Samuel Chrzanowski, defender of Trembowla (Strój Jana Samuela Chrzanowskiego obrońcy Trembowli, watercolour on paper, 1856)
- Ivan Gonty, Cossack's commander, guilty of massacre in Humań (Ivan Gonty, dowódca kozacki, winny rzezi na Humaniu, watercolour on paper, 1859);

Genre paintings:

- In tavern in Podolia (W karczmie na Podolu, 1851);
- Party in Sofijówka (Zabawa w Sofijówce, 1849)
- Parents bless youth (Rodzice błogosławią młodość)
- Mrs. Twardowska and Mr. Twardowski (Pani Twardowska and Pan Twardowski, 1859, – ill. to the ballad by Adam Mickiewicz);
- Cracovian Wedding (Krakowskie wesele)
- Plays in matrimony (Gra w mariasza);
- Late afternoon scene near table (Scena podwieczorna przy stole)
- Woman giving services Jews usurers (Kobieta dająca zastaw Żydom lichwiarzom)
- Peasant's courtships to girl (Zaloty chłopa do dziewczyny);
- Young married woman from peripheries Tarnopola in XVIII c. (Młoda mężatka z peryferii Tarnopola w XVIII wieku, watercolour on paper, 1859);
- Peasant from Podolia (Podolski chłop, watercolour on paper, 1856);
- Jewish musician in carnival (Grajek-żyd na zapustach, watercolour on paper, 1859);
- Sabbath day (Szabas, 1857)
- Jewish musician [playing] on Double-bass in XVIII c. (Żyd-grajek na Basetli w XVIII wieku 1859),
- Jewish musician [playing] on Cymbals (Żyd-grajek na Cymbałach)

Religious paintings:

- St. Tecla and Michael the Archangel, (Św. Tekla i archanioł Michał) 1830 (in Kodeń)
- St. Teresa and St. Michael the Archangel; (Św. Teresa i Św. Michał archanioł)
- Holy Family, (Święta Rodzina);
- The Mother of God, (Bogurodzica in Dubno)
- Matka Boska Częstochowska (for Bernardine church in Sokal)
- St. Barbra, (Św. Barbara for Bernardine order in Lvov)
- Holy Trynity and Mother of God (Św. Trójcę i Bogarodzica for Church in Seret)

Landscapes:

- Waterfall, (Wodospad).

== See also ==
- List of Poles
- List of Polish painters

== Bibliography ==
- Л. Купчинська „Подільський художник Ян Ігнацій Машковський: штрихи до творчої біографії”, Записки Львівської національної наукової бібліотеки України імені В. Стефаника, 2015, 7-th ed., p. 596-615.
- Л. Є. Колесник „Львівський художник Ян Машковський” in: „Вісник Харківської державної академії дизайну і мистецтв. Мистецтвознавство. Архитектура.”, 2011, Issue 6, pp. 145–147.
- Emmanuel Bénézit The Benezit dictionary of artists, Oxford University Press, Oxford, 1999.
- Emmanuel Bénézit Dictionnaire critique et documentaire des Peintres, Sculpteurs, Dessinateurs et Graveurs de tous les temps et de tous les pays par un group d’écrivains spécialistes français et étrangers, Nouvelle Édition, Tome Septième (Loyet-Lorski – Okasaki), Librairie Gründ, 1876, p. 249.
- Joachim Busse Internationales Handbuch aller Maler und Bildhauer des 19. Jahrhunderts = International directory of all XIXth century painters and sculptors = Guide international de tous les peintres et sculpteurs du XIXe siècle = Manuale internazionale di tutti i pittori e scultori dell'ottcento = Compendio internacional de todos los pintores y escultores del siglo decimonono, publ. Busse, Wiesbaden, 1977.
- Anna Lewicka-Morawska; Marek Machowski; Maria Anna Rudzka Słownik malarzy polskich., Vol. 1 Od średniowiecza do modernizmu, Warsaw, 1998, p. 120.
- Słownik artystów polskich i obcych w polsce działających (zmarłych przed 1966 r.), publ. Instytut Sztuki Polskiej Akademii Nauk, Warsaw, 1971–1986, pp. 78–79.
- Feliks Kopera Malarstwo w Polsce XIX i XX wieku, Part III: Malarstwo w Polsce XIX i XX wieku, Drukarnia Narodowa w Krakowie, Cracow, 1929, p. 117, 176, 186, 278.
- Saur Allgemeines Künstler-Lexikon : Die Bilder Künstler aller Zeiten und Völker, Vol. 87 (Mandelstamm-Matieli), K.G. Saur, München, Leipzig, 1997, p. 506.
