= Phryne (painting) =

1867 painting by Artur Grottger

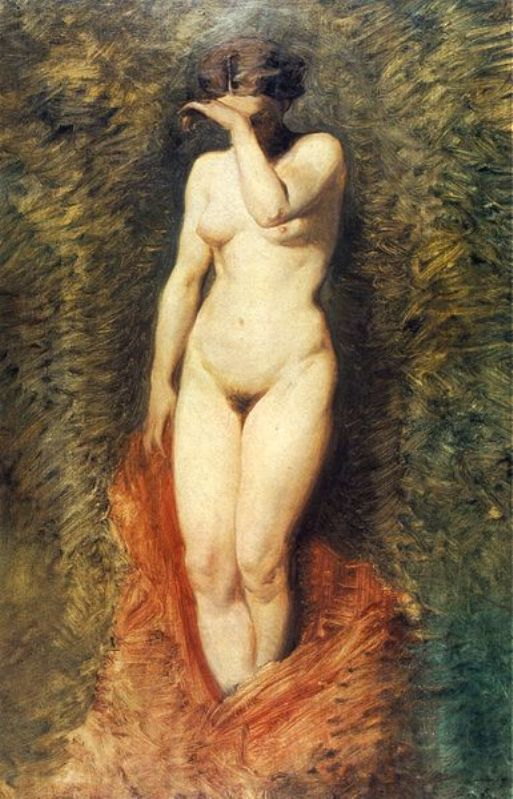
- Artist: Artur Grottger
- Year: 1867
- Medium: Oil-on-canvas
- Dimensions: 97 cm × 62 cm (38.1 in × 24.4 in)
- Location: Czartoryski Museum; Kraków

Phryne (Polish: Fryne) is an 1867 oil on canvas painting by Artur Grottger, now in the Czartoryski Museum in Krakow, Poland.

== Description ==
The painting portrays the ancient Greek courtesan Phryne, who according to legend revealed her breasts before her judges to save herself from a death sentence for sacrilege. It depicts a naked woman standing in the middle of the painting and a bush in the background. Her left hand is raised in order to cover her face. Her right hand holds a red robe lying at her feet. It was painted during the artist's stay in Paris a few months before his death.

== See also ==
- List of Polish painters

== Bibliography ==
- Bieżuńska-Małowist, Iza (1993). Kobiety antyku. Talenty, ambicje, namiętności. Warszawa: Wydawnictwo Naukowe PWN. ISBN 83-01-11054-6.
- Bołoz Antoniewicz, Jan (1910). Grottger. Lwów: E. Wende i Spółka Warszawa, nakład księgarni H. Altenberga Lwów.
- Czapska-Michalik, Magdalena (2007). Artur Grottger 1837 – 1867. Warszawa: Wydawnictwo Edipesse Polska. ISBN 978-83-7477-209-9.
- Dobrowolski, Tadeusz (1970). Artur Grottger. Nauka dla wszystkich, nr 121. Kraków: Polska Akademia Nauk.
- Kokoska, Barbara (2015). Akt w malarstwie polskim. Ożarów Mazowiecki: Firma Księgarska Oleksiejuk. ISBN 978-83-274-2929-2.
- Gołubiew, Zofia; Król, Anna (1988). Spis dzieł Artura Grottgera eksponowanych na wystawie monograficznej w Pałacu Sztuki Towarzystwa Przyjaciół Sztuk Pięknych w Krakowie marzec – maj 1988. Kraków.
- Potocki, Antoni (1907). Grottger. Lwów: E. Wende i Spółka Warszawa, nakład księgarni H. Altenberga Lwów.
- Puciata-Pawłowska, Jadwiga (1962). Artur Grottger. Prace Wydziału Filologiczno-Filozoficznego, tom XII, z. 3. Toruń: Towarzystwo Naukowe w Toruniu.
- Świeżawski, Ludwik (1975). Dobry geniusz. Łódź: Wydawnictwo Łódzkie.
- "Grottger zawiśnie u księżnej". DziennikWschodni.pl (in Polish). 2007-01-16.
