= Artur Grottger =

Polish painter (1837–1867)

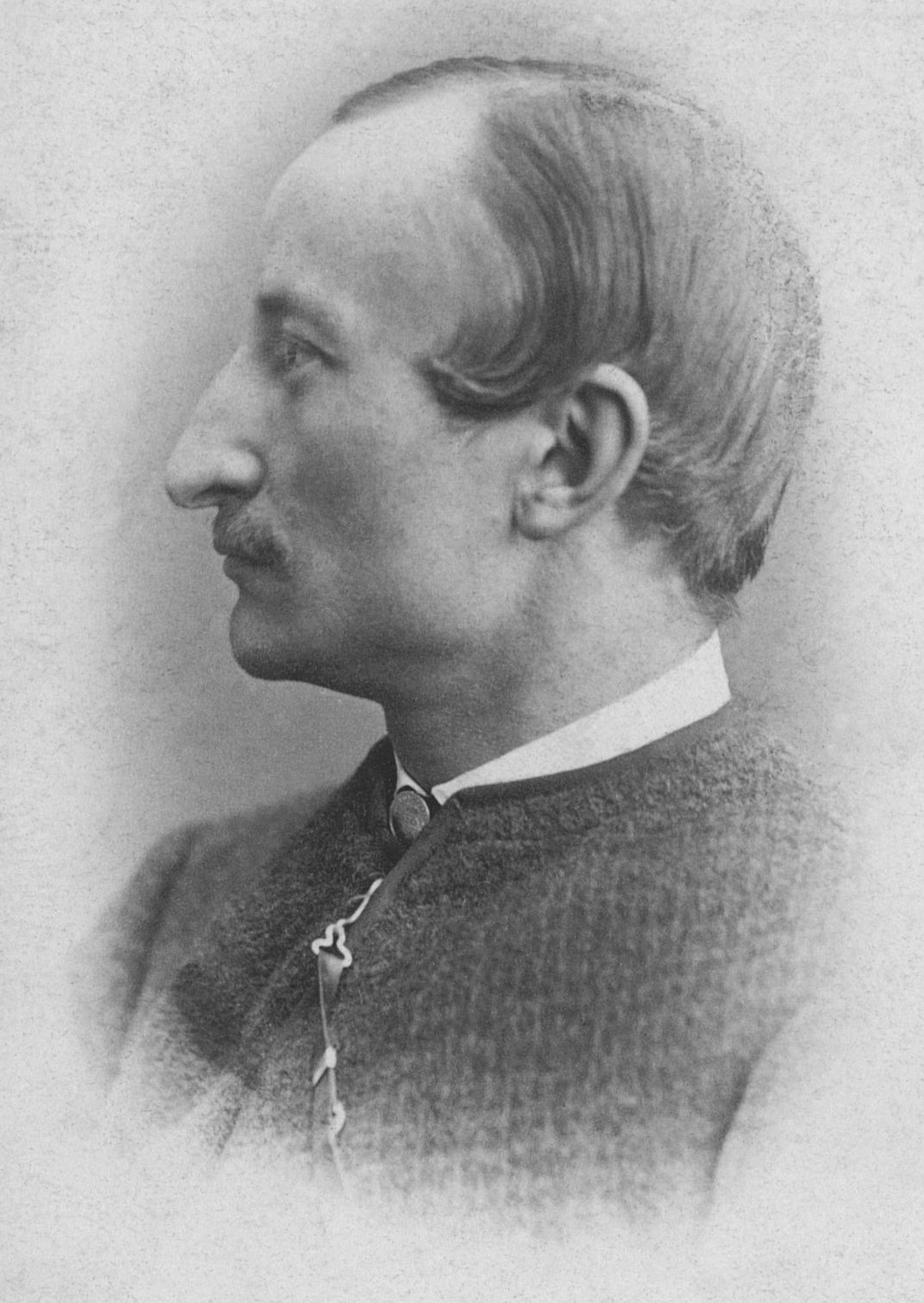
- Born: 11 November 1837; Ottyniowice, Eastern Galicia
- Died: 13 December 1867 (aged 30); Paris, France

Artur Grottger (11 November 1837 – 13 December 1867) was a Polish Romantic painter and graphic artist, one of the most prominent artists of the mid 19th century under the partitions of Poland, despite a life cut short by incurable illness.

== Biography ==
Grottger was born in Ottyniowice, Eastern Galicia (now Otynevychi, Ukraine) to Jan Józef Grottger, a Polish officer of German origin commanding the Uhlans' Regiment called Warszawskie Dzieci (the Warsaw Children) during the failed November Uprising against the Russians (1831); an amateur artist himself, with many areas of passion.

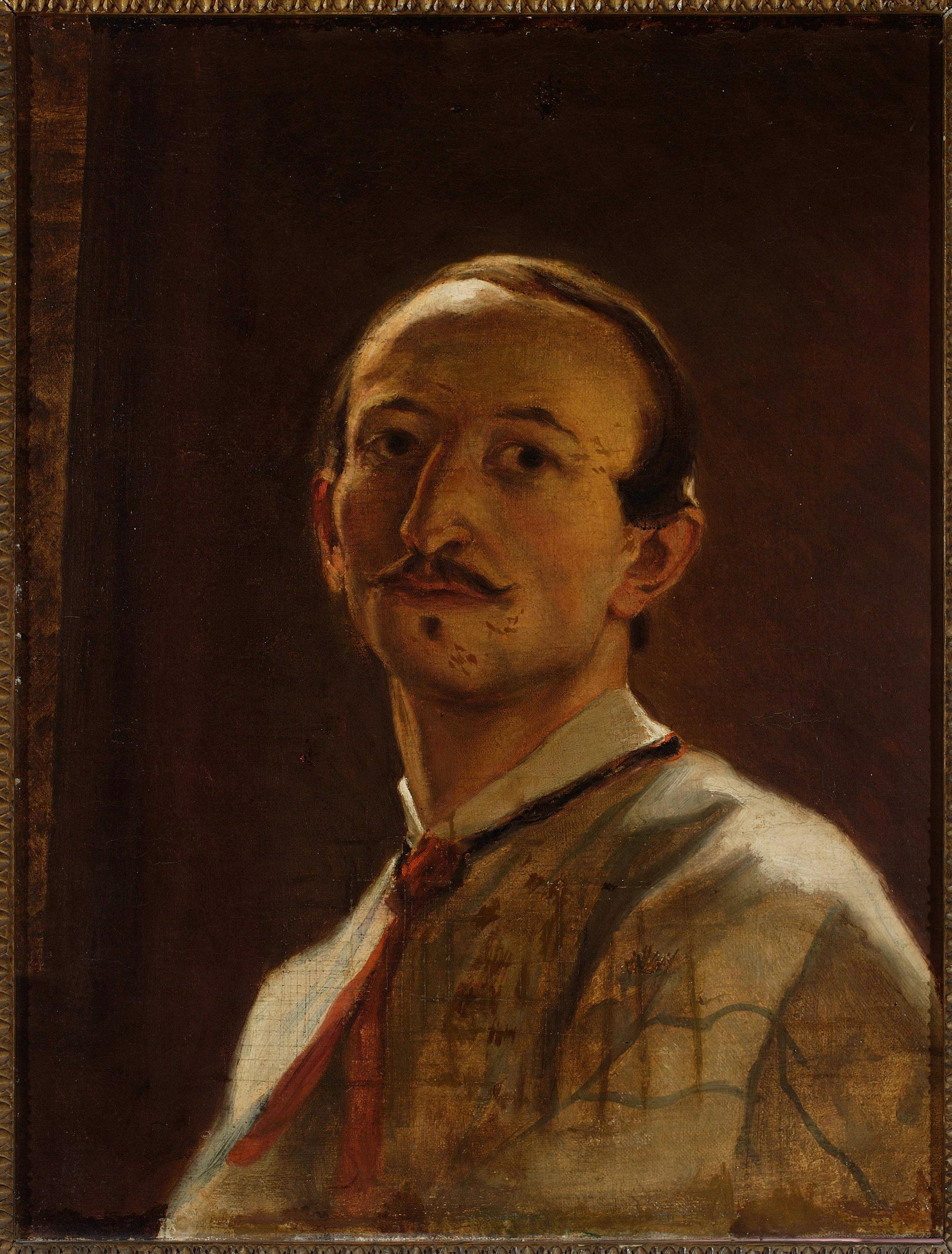
Self-portrait, 1867

At age 11, Artur Grottger was sent from a quiet estate to study painting in Lwów under the apprenticeship of Jan Kanty Maszkowski (1848–1852), (together with Stanisław Tarnowski) and (briefly) Juliusz Kossak. In 1852 he embarked on a journey to Kraków (then in the Austrian Partition) to attend classes at the Jan Matejko Academy of Fine Arts. He studied under Władysław Łuszczkiewicz and Wojciech Kornel Stattler. In 1855–1858 he went to the academy in Vienna and studied under Karl von Blaas and Christian Ruben. While in Austria, he travelled to Munich, Venice and to Hungary, where he met his biggest future sponsor and benefactor, Count Aleksander Pappenheim. He returned to Poland in 1865 upon the collapse of the January Uprising.

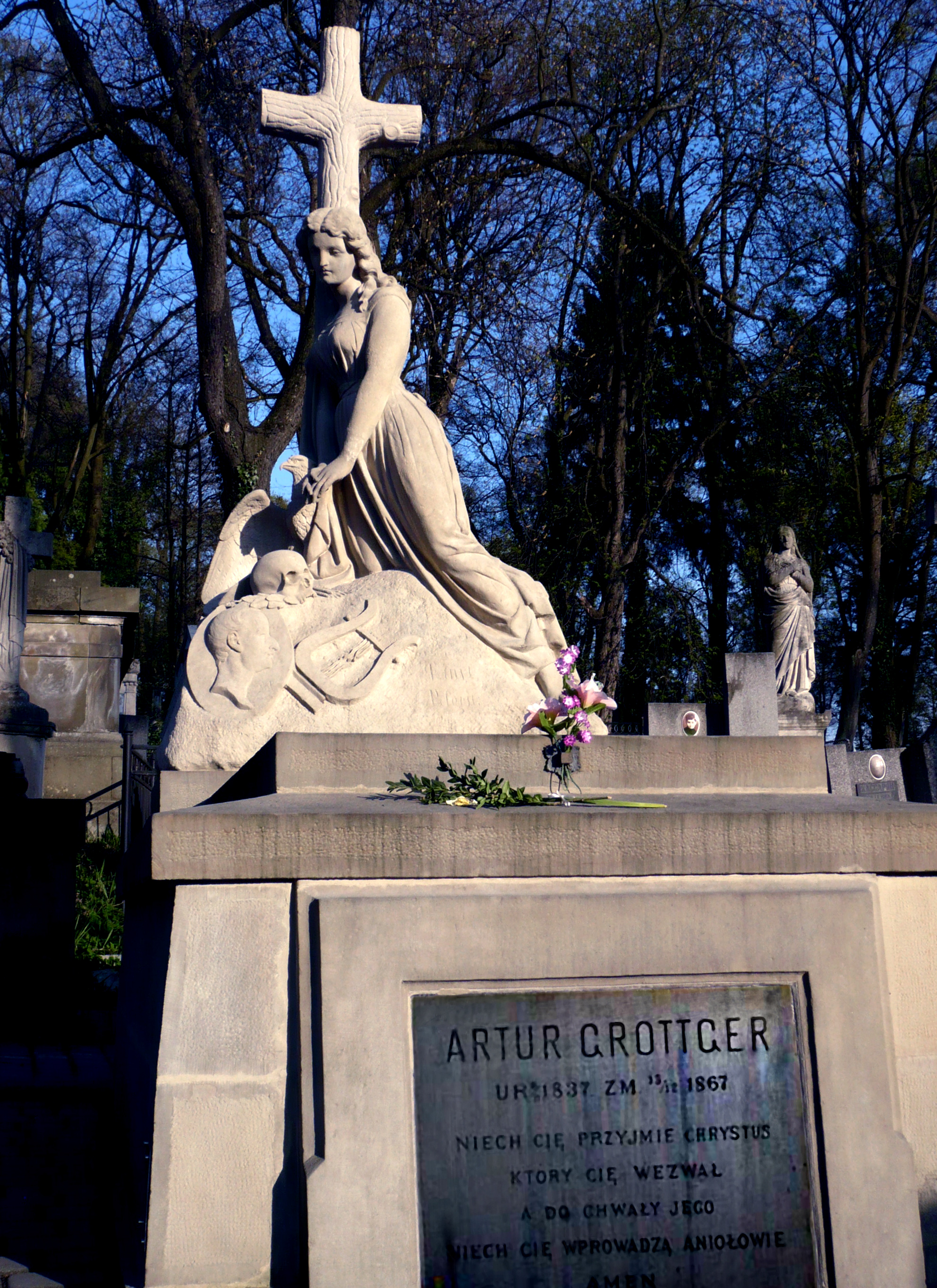
Grottger's Grave at Lychakivskiy Cemetery, Lviv

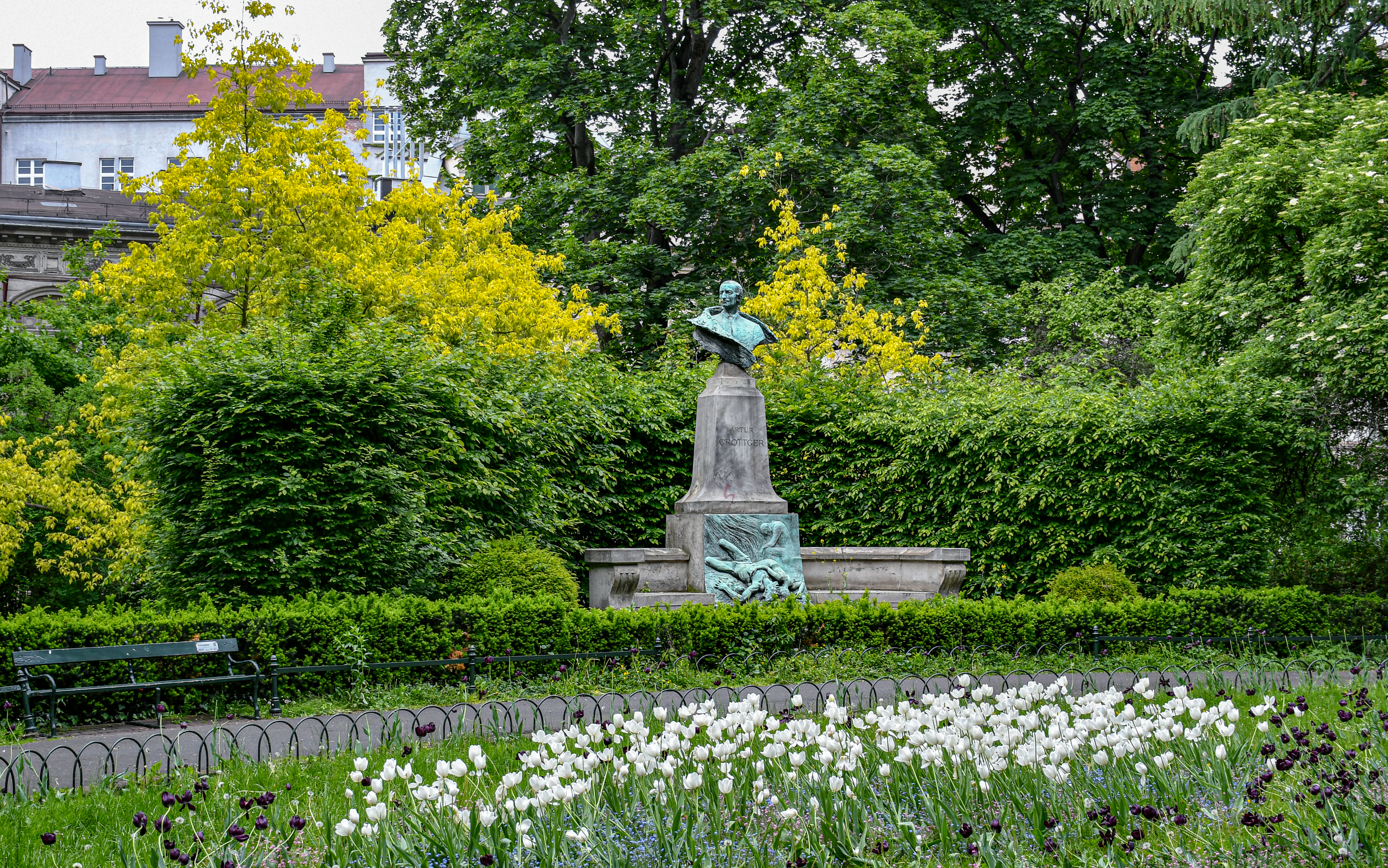
Artur Grottger monument at Planty Park in Kraków

For a time, Grottger moved between the estates of Polish art lovers in Podolia, among others the Manor House of Stanisław Tarnowski in Śniatynka, where he painted numerous pictures for the cycle Lithuania. In 1866 he met his fiancée Wanda Monné, a young Polish patriot, and spent a lot of time at her house. However, he also developed tuberculosis. In 1867 he went to Paris hoping to make more money; there he visited Hôtel Lambert, and met with Jean-Léon Gérôme. As his illness worsened, he went to a sanatorium at Amélie-les-Bains-Palalda in the Pyrénées, where he died on 13 December 1867. His body was brought back to Poland by his fiancée and buried at the Lwów Cemetery on 4 July 1868.

== Artistic career ==
Grottger painted mostly epic battle scenes, portraits, and horses. He produced some of his most famous paintings while in Vienna. During his stay in occupied Poland, he poured all of his talent and energy into depicting the hopes and horrors of the failed Polish insurrections in several series of black-and-while panels including Warszawa, Polonia, Lithuania and Wojna (1863–1867) which brought him no income. The series titled "Polonia" included eight boards, depicting the grim realities of everyday life and struggle under Russian occupation. "Polonia" was a response to the failed insurrection of 1863–65. His last painting was his self-portrait.

In 1908, Ignacy Jan Paderewski, whose own father had been caught up in the insurrection and had been arrested, completed his magnum opus, the Symphony in B minor "Polonia", which was inspired by Grottger's series of paintings.

== Selected works ==
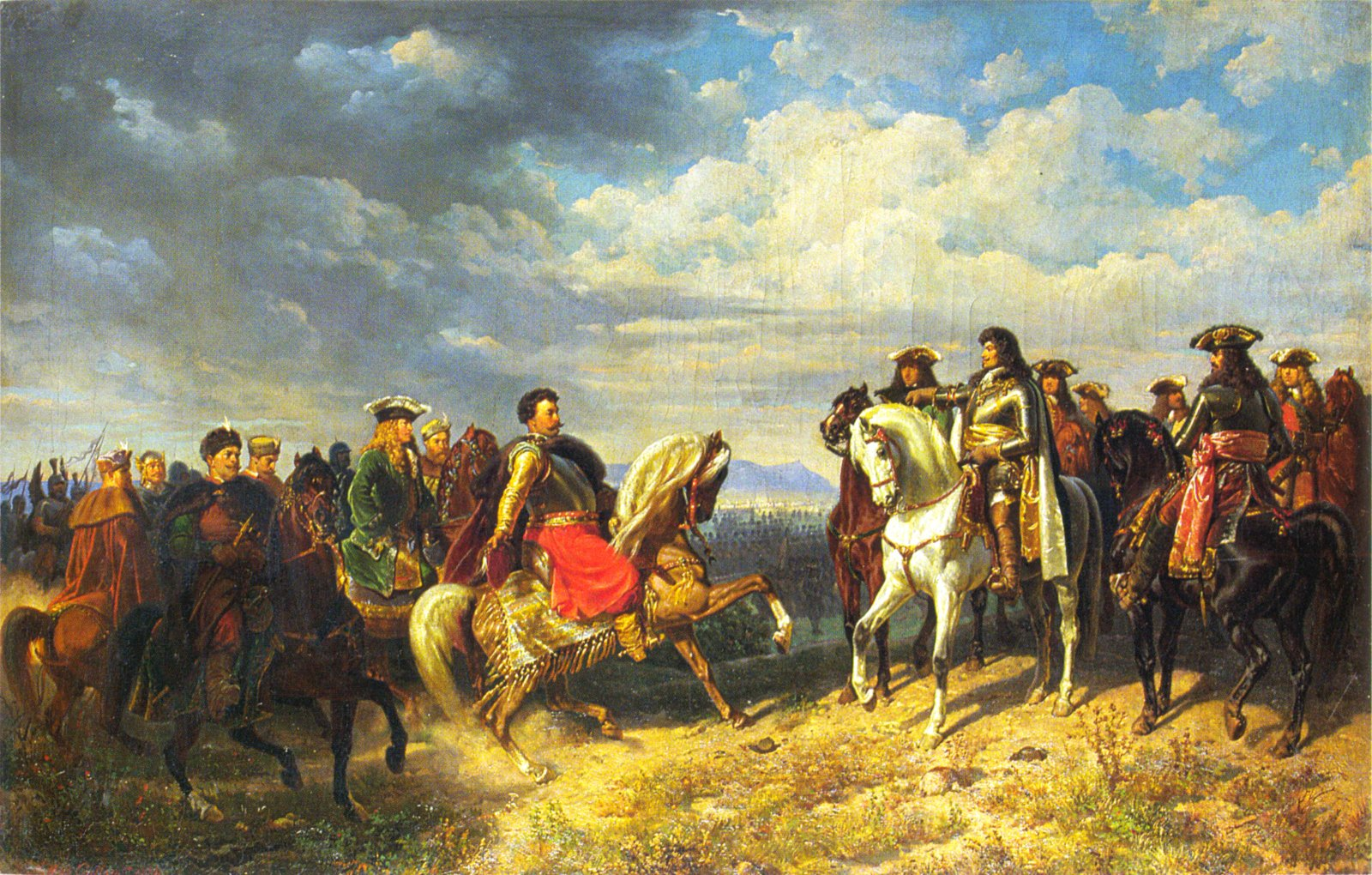
Sobieski and Leopold I at Schwechat, 1859

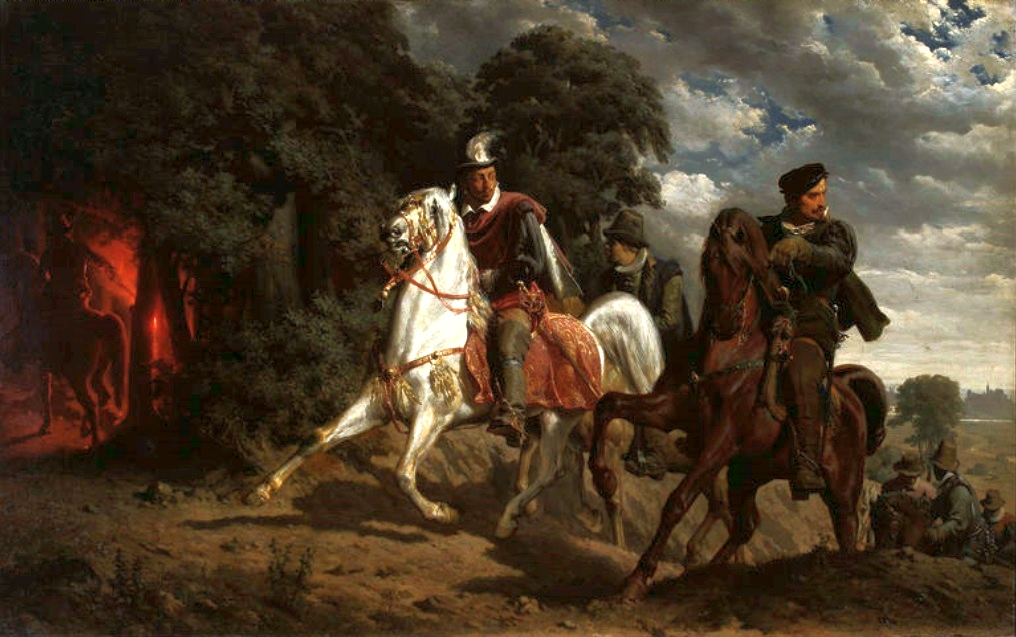
Escape of Henry III from Poland, 1860

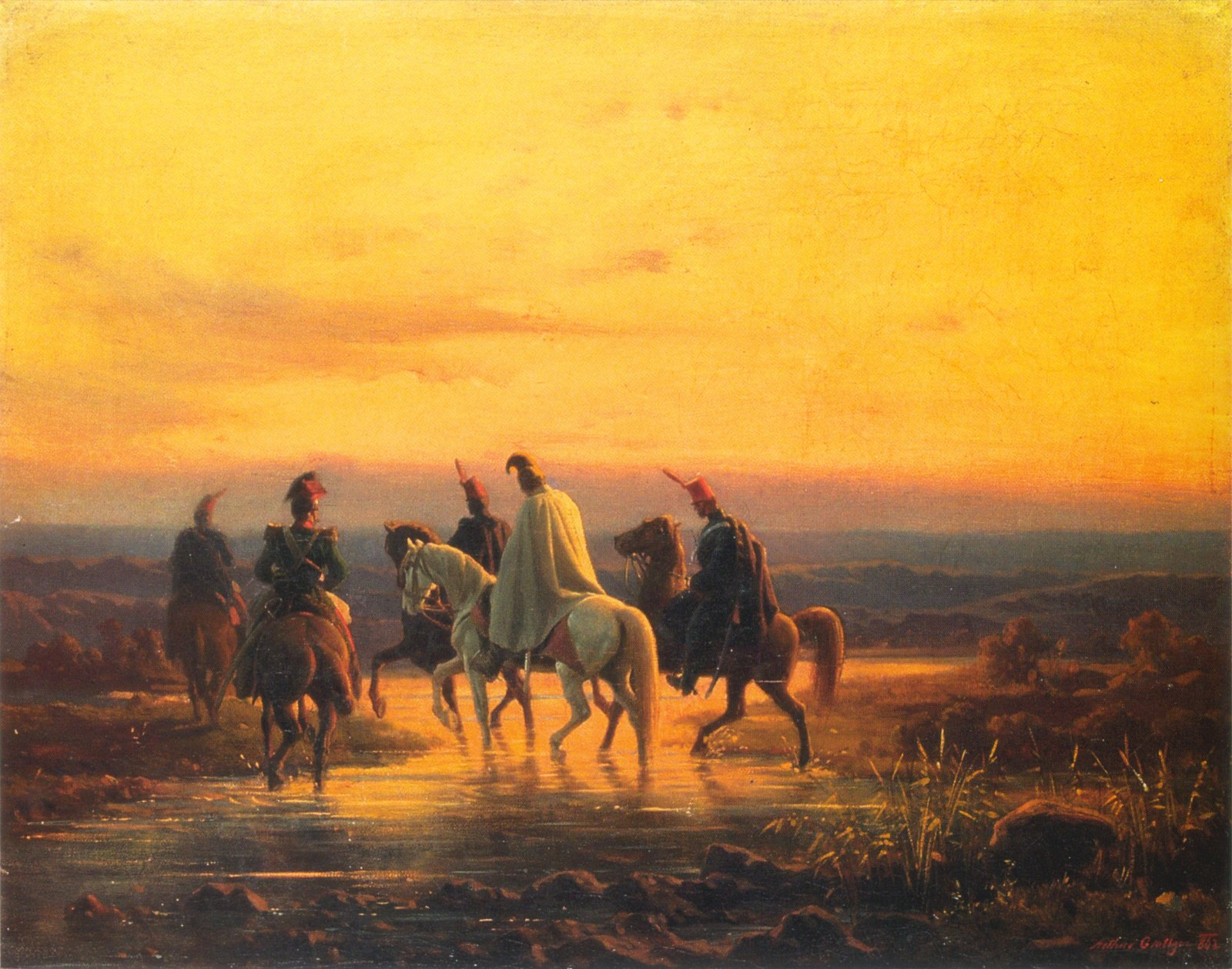
Reconnaissance, 1862

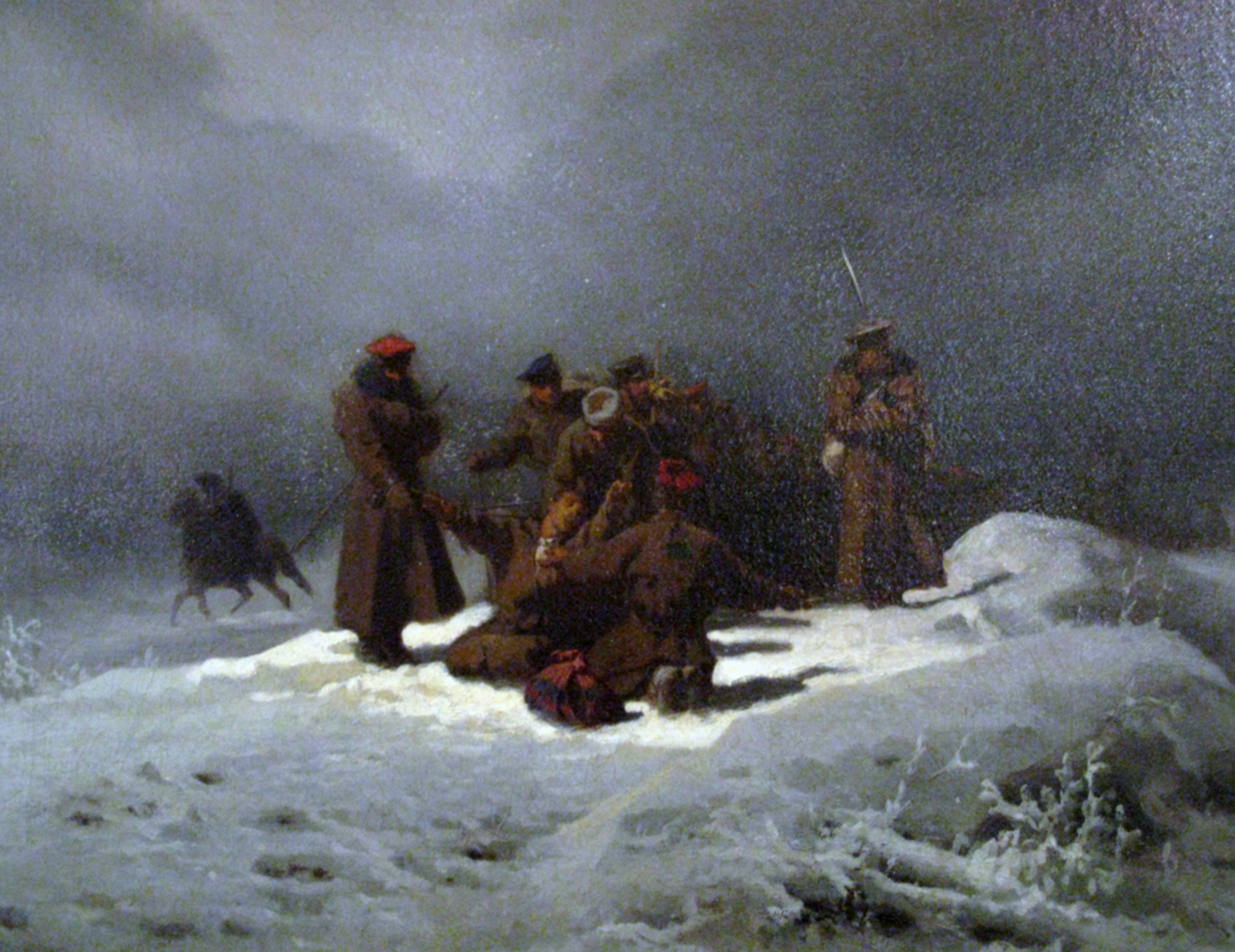
Death-march to Siberia, 1866
From series of panels
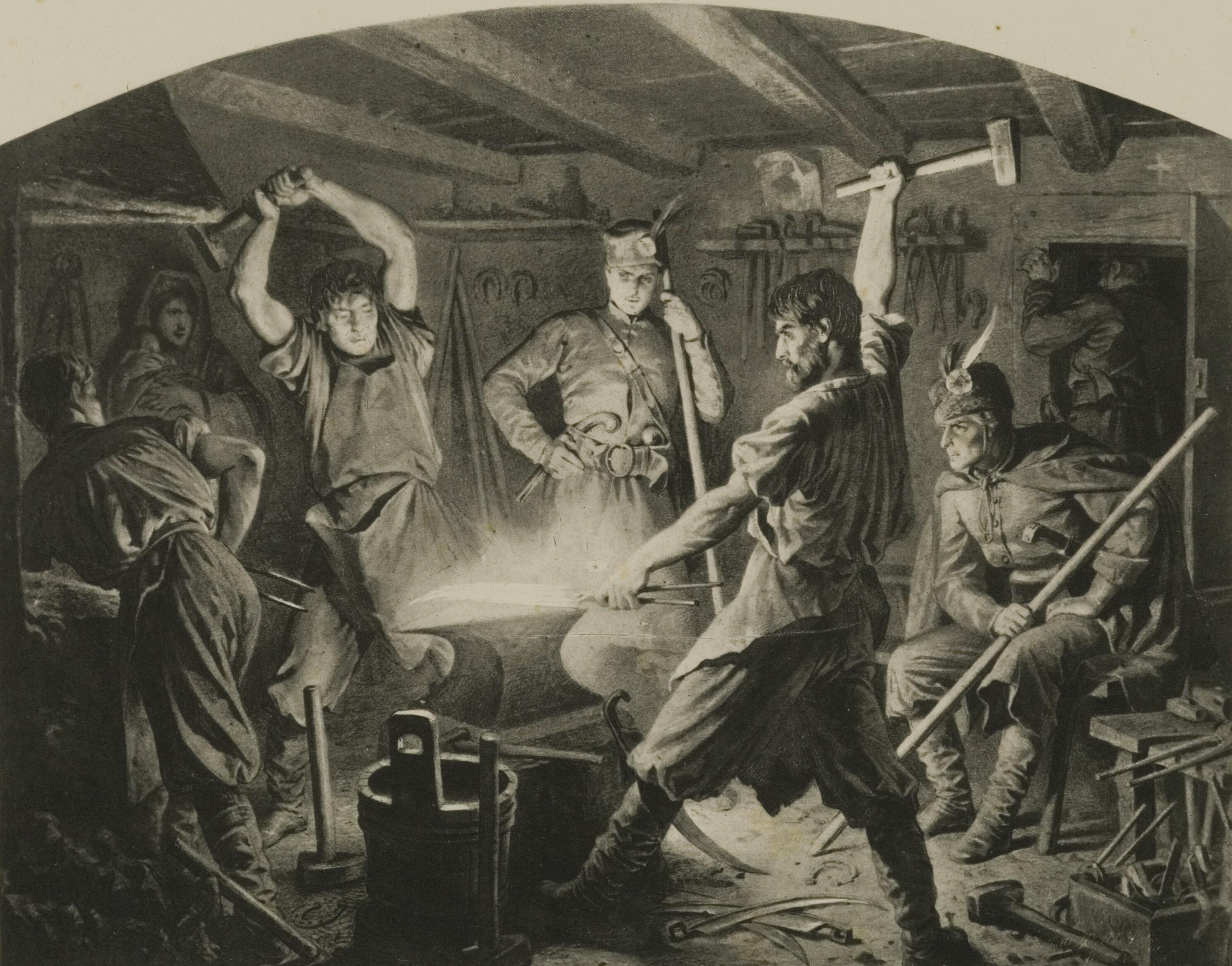
The Beating of Scythes, 1863

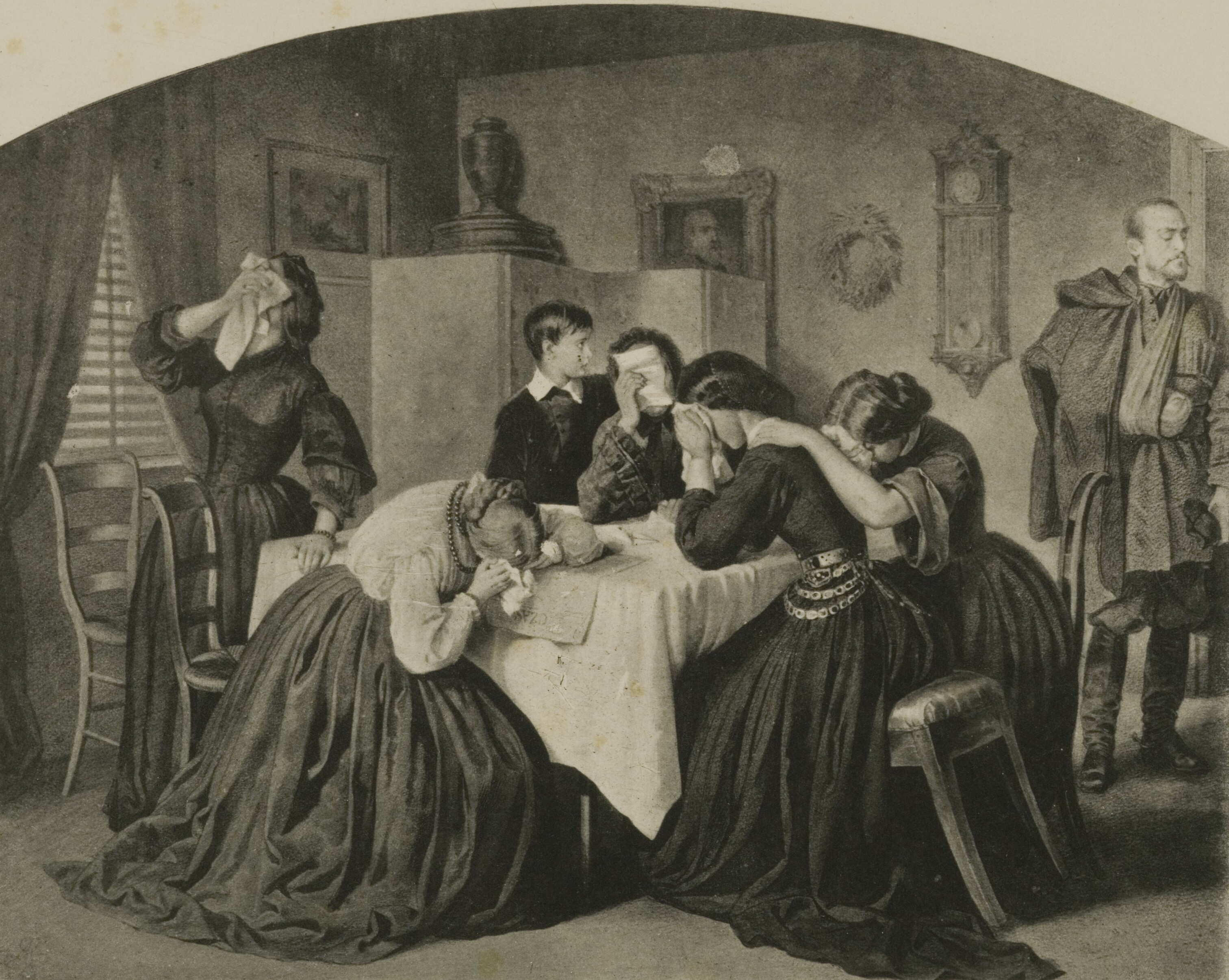
Mournful Tidings, 1863

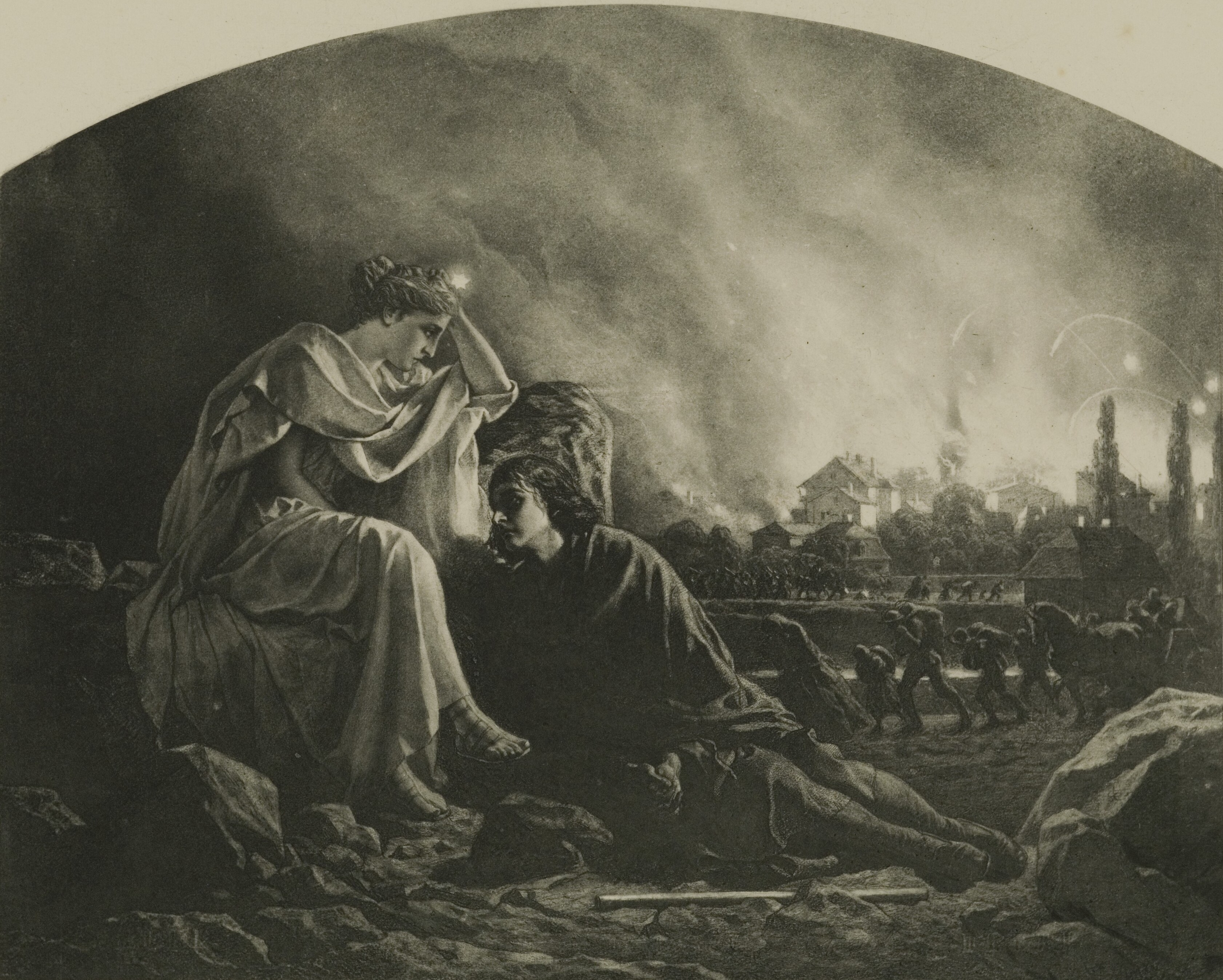
Conflagration, 1863

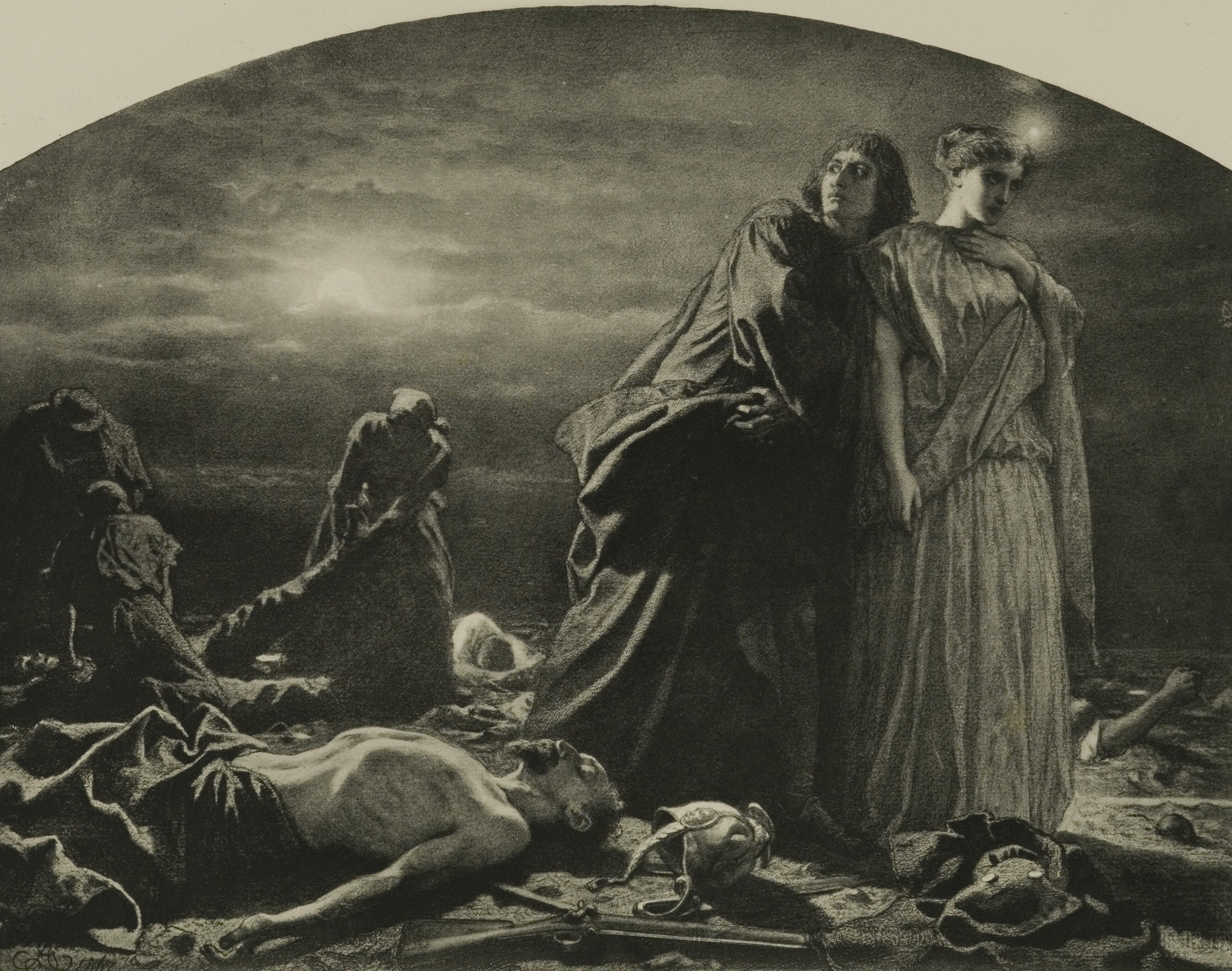
People or Jackals, 1863

== See also ==
- Academy of Fine Arts in Kraków
- Culture of Kraków
- Phryne

== Notes and references ==
- "Artur Grottger biography". Archived from the original on 31 October 2007. at Sopot.pl
- Media related to Artur Grottger at Wikimedia Commons
- "Grottger, Arthur von" . New International Encyclopedia. 1905.
