= Władysława Habicht =

Polish suffragette (1867–1963)

Władysława Habicht (1 June 1867 – 2 April 1963) was a Polish suffragette, social activist, and part of the housing cooperative movement.

== Biography ==
She was born in Odporyszów to parents of German descent and attended a convent school in Staniątki. Around 1890, she moved to Kraków with her father and siblings. Prior to World War I, she was an active member of Towarzystwo Szkoły Ludowej (Folk School Society) and the Union of Catholic Women. During the war, she joined the League of Women, National Defense and the Western Borderlands.

In 1901, Habicht she took the position of an imperial–royal telegraphist at the central post office in Kraków, and worked there for 30 years. In 1905, she founded the Association of Galician Postal Clerks. As part of the Association, mutual economic aid was provided to female members, the professional interests of postal clerks were looked after, petitions were written to the authorities, and a library was established. Since only unmarried women were accepted to work in post offices at that time, the association founded by Habicht served as a labour union and community that provided the workers with a sense of group belonging, financial aid, and support. The group's postulates emphasized the importance women's emancipation, which would allow them workers rights; including overtime pay, holidays, sick pay and a better retirement pension. They also demanded equal treatment in employment for positions and departments previously restricted to men.

From 1911, Habicht campaigned for voting rights to women. In the period of the elections to Sejm, she organized a campaign encouraging women to engage in politics. After Poland's regain of independence, she supported plebiscite campaigns, arousing national awareness among Silesian women who at the time were migrating to Kraków in great numbers. In the period of the elections to Sejm, she organized a campaign encouraging women to engage in politics.

The association obtained a plot at 4 Sołtyka Street in 1913, where it organized the first housing unit, financed with income from events, and two loans. Habicht, Elżbieta Ciechanowska and Zofia Kołpy were the first board of the housing coop. In 1914, the house was ready, and Habicht lived there together with Ciechanowska. Their relationship has been compared to Boston marriages and considered in a LGBT context nowadays, though not without objections, most notably from the contemporary Władysława Habicht Postal Clerk Housing Cooperative. In 1934 a second building for its members was created at 19B Syrokomli Street.

In recognition of her achievement, Habicht received the Silesian Plebiscite Badge, the Silver Cross of Merit and the Golden Cooperative Badge. At the end of her life, she was looked after by the members of the Society she ran. She died on April 2, 1963, and was buried in the family tomb at the Rakowicki Cemetery.
