= Elżbieta Ciechanowska =

- Born: 18 November 1875; Bochnia, Galicia, Austro-Hungarian Empire
- Died: 29 April 1948 (aged 72); Kraków, Poland
- Other names: E.C., E.C. Dulska, E. Cedulska
- Occupations: Women's rights activist, labor activist, poet, musician

Elżbieta Ciechanowska (18 November 1875, Bochnia – 29 April 1948, Kraków), pen names E.C., E.C. Dulska, E. Cedulska, was a Polish women's rights and labor activist, musician and poet.

== Life ==
Born in Bochnia, Ciechanowska moved to Kraków in 1883. She graduated from Kraków conservatory as the best student in harmony class of professor Władysław Żeleński, who called her "Bach" to praise her talent. In years 1894–1903 she kept a diary. Described as a shy and modest person, she decided to not pursue a piano or music teaching career and became a postal clerk. She joined the 1905-established Association of Galician Postal Clerks and devoted herself to the Association, politics and women's rights. As part of the Association, mutual economic aid was provided to female members, the professional interests of postal clerks were looked after, petitions were written to the authorities, and a library was established. Since at that time only unmarried women were accepted to work in post offices, the Association served as a trade union and community that provided the workers with a sense of group belonging, financial aid, and support. The group's postulates emphasized the importance of women's emancipation, which would allow them workers rights; including overtime pay, holidays, sick pay and a better retirement pension. They also demanded equal treatment in employment for positions and departments previously restricted to men.

When the association obtained a plot at 4 Sołtyka Street in 1913, and decided to build its first housing unit, Ciechanowska was part of the first board of the housing coop (with Władysława Habicht and Zofia Kołpy). In 1914 the house was ready, and Ciechanowska lived there with Władysława Habicht. Their relationship has been compared to Boston marriages and read in an LGBT context nowadays, though some, most notably the modern Władysława Habicht Postal Clerk Housing Cooperative, dispute this characterization.

As a writer, she published a drama, Antrakt (lit. Entracte) in 1928; a poetry anthology, Wiersze niemodne (lit. Unfashionable Poems) in 1935; and Kilka prostych uwag o Wyspiańskim (Few Simple Notes About Wyspiański) in 1938. Ciechanowska died on 29 April 1948 in Kraków and was buried at Rakowicki Cemetery.
