= Zefiryn Ćwikliński =

Polish painter (1871–1930)

- Born: Zefiryn (Zefir) Alojzy Ćwikliński; 6 February 1871; Lviv, Poland, today Ukraine
- Died: 24 July 1930 (aged 59); Zakopane, Poland
- Known for: Painting

Zefiryn (Zefir) Alojzy Ćwikliński Ceferino (February 6, 1871 in Lviv – July 24, 1930 in Zakopane) - Polish painter, known primarily for painting in the Tatra mountains.

== Biography ==
He graduated from high school in Lviv, then for a year, he studied philosophy at the University of Lviv, and later, after moving to Kraków - in the years 1887-1889 - studied at the Jan Matejko Academy of Fine Arts where he was the student of Florian Cynk, Władysław Łuszczkiewicz, Feliks Szynalewski and Izydor Jabłoński. In 1893, he received a scholarship and continued his studies at the Vienna Academy with a historical painter and portraitist Christian Griepenkerl. He specialised in historic paintings, portraits and those of different genres. With the lack of financial resources he was forced to return to the country. After returning home, he was a teacher of art in Brody and Jarosław. As a result of political conflicts with school authorities he was dismissed. In 1898 he went to Italy and Dalmatia, where he spent half a year studying landscape painting. In 1904 he was one of the Grupa Sześciu in Lviv.

== Works of art ==
At first he created paintings of fairy-tale themes, he also worked as an illustrator (he published illustrations every Lviv fortnight in the "Faun" magazine, but also had illustrated books). He had been strongly influenced by Władysław Podkowiński. Around 1897 he also made landscape paintings, of the area around Lviv. He arrived to the property of Stanisław Jerzy Hofmokl who in the village of Zarzecze bought an estate and mansion from the Kostheimów. When arriving he had painted landscapes and the Zarzecka chapel, "Zarzecze thought to be one of the most beautiful parts of Poland". In 1908 he settled in Zakopane and since then he painted mostly landscapes of the Tatra Mountains, which are shown at exhibitions. He created many post cards which popularised the Tatra Mountains and him in the region.

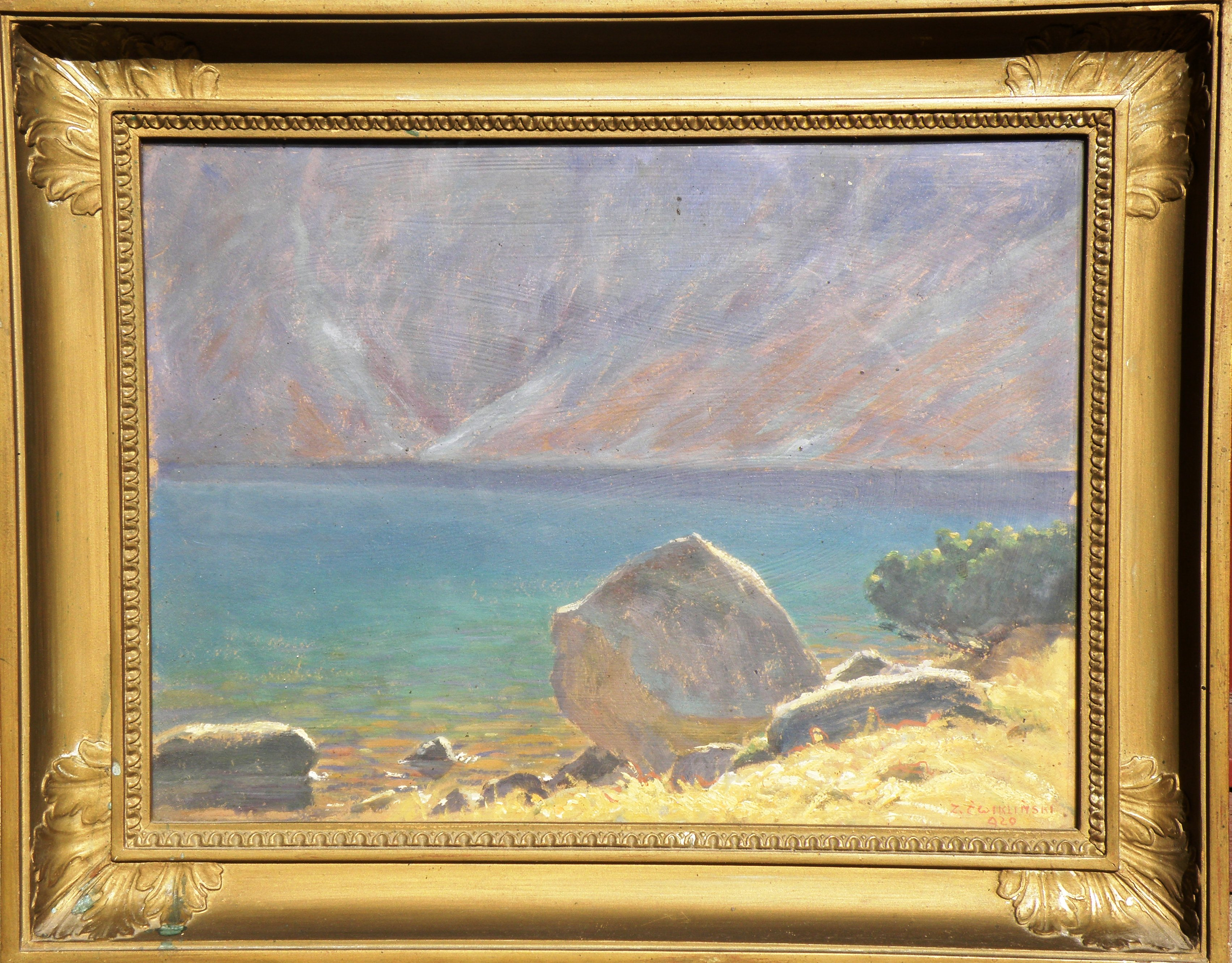
Czarny Staw, 1920, private

His popular and most notable works of art include:

- Pejzaże śródziemnomorskie 5 obrazów współoprawionych, oil on canvas, 31,7 × 54,5 cm
- Cyprysy, oil on canvas, 123 × 81 cm
- Pejzaż, oil on canvas, 8,5 × 11,5 cm
- Portret góralki, oil on canvas, 63 × 68 cm
- Góralka, after 1910, oil on canvas, 63 × 60 cm
- Portret dziewczynki, watercolour on paper, 22 × 16 cm
- Kozi Wierch, 1911–1912, oil on canvas, 90,5 × 116 cm
- Pniak w lesie, 1913, oil on canvas, 30,8 × 41,5 cm
- Czarny Staw, 1920, private
- Krajobraz górski, 1922
- Pejzaż górski z limbą, oil on canvas
- Pejzaż górski, oil on canvas, 30 × 40 cm
- Baca z owcami, 1923, oil on canvas
- Hala Kondratowa, oil on canvas
- Wypas owiec w górach, 1921, oil on canvas
- Wypas owiec w górach, 1924, oil on canvas, 31 × 35 cm
- Wypas owiec, 1924, pastel on canvas, 49 × 68,5 cm
- Pejzaż tatrzański, 1925, oil on plywood
- Kwitnąca jabłoń, 1926, oil on canvas, 35,5 × 30 cm, private
- Łąka w górach, oil on canvas, 21,5 × 38 cm, private
- Czarny Staw, 1926, oil on canvas, 31,5 × 36 cm, private
- Limby nad Morskim Okiem, 1927, oil, tempera on canvas, 30,8 × 35,5 cm
- Owce na hali tatrzańskiej (part of the Eastern Doliny Stawów Gąsienicowych with a view of the peaks of Kościelca), 1927, oil on canvas, 30 x 35,2
- Cielę przed szałasem w górach, 1929, oil on canvas.

== Membership in organisations ==
Ćwikliński belonged to Zakopane's Union of Artists, he was also active in the Association of the Public Library.

== Selected exhibitions ==
- Exhibitions in Kraków's National Museum (1892, 1893, 1894), and in the city Lviv.
- The first thematic exhibition of landscape paintings in the Tatra house "Jutrzenka" in Zakopane, in December 1909.
- Exhibition in Kraków's National Museum for Towarzystwa Przyjaciół Sztuk Pięknych, February–March 1912, 48 landscape paintings of the Tatra Mountains.
- In Zakopane in 1931 was held his posthumous exhibition.

He exhibited in Lviv, Warsaw and Kraków, as well as abroad in (London, Kiev, Vienna, Budapest, Chicago). In 1930 at the international exhibition of mountaineering in Budapest his painting under the title of Limba had been distinguished and awarded.

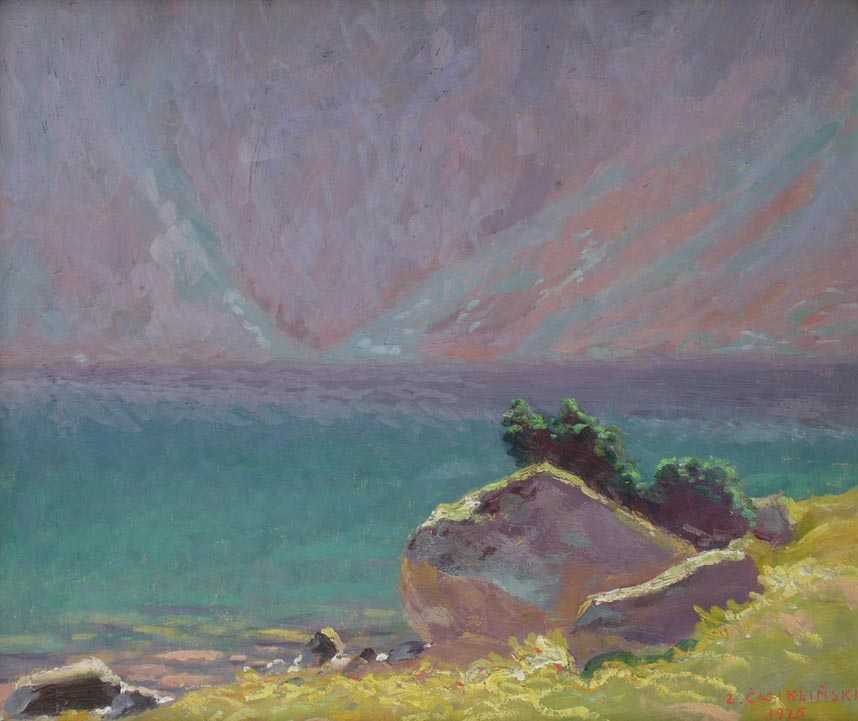
Czarny Staw

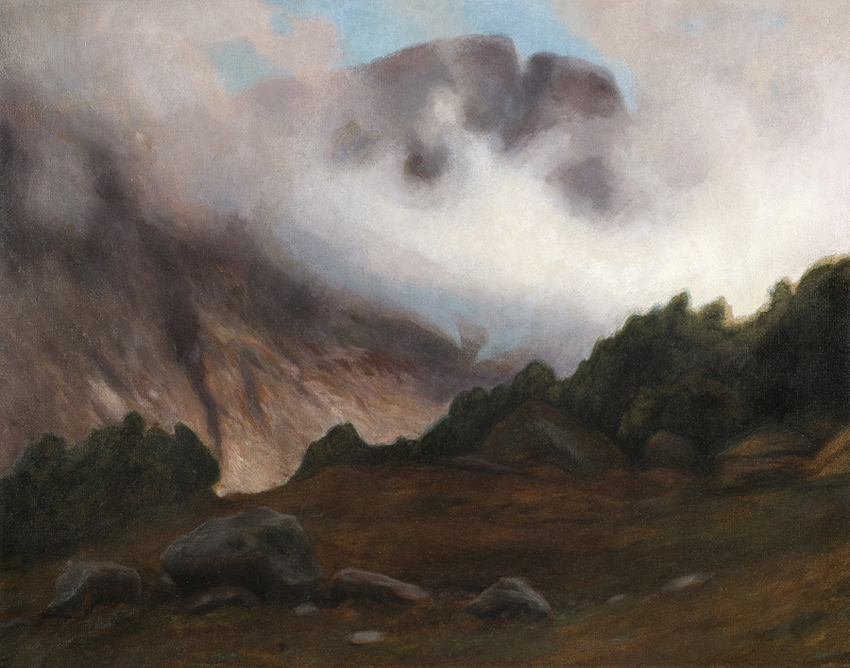
Kozi Wierch

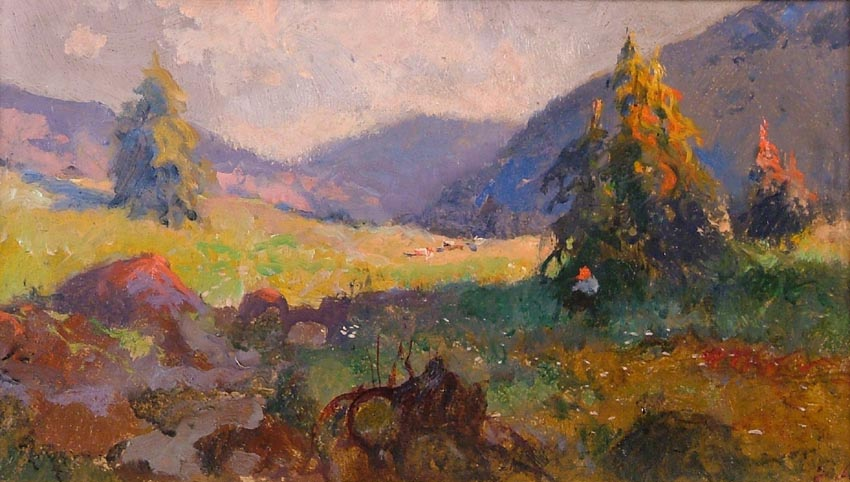
Łąka w górach

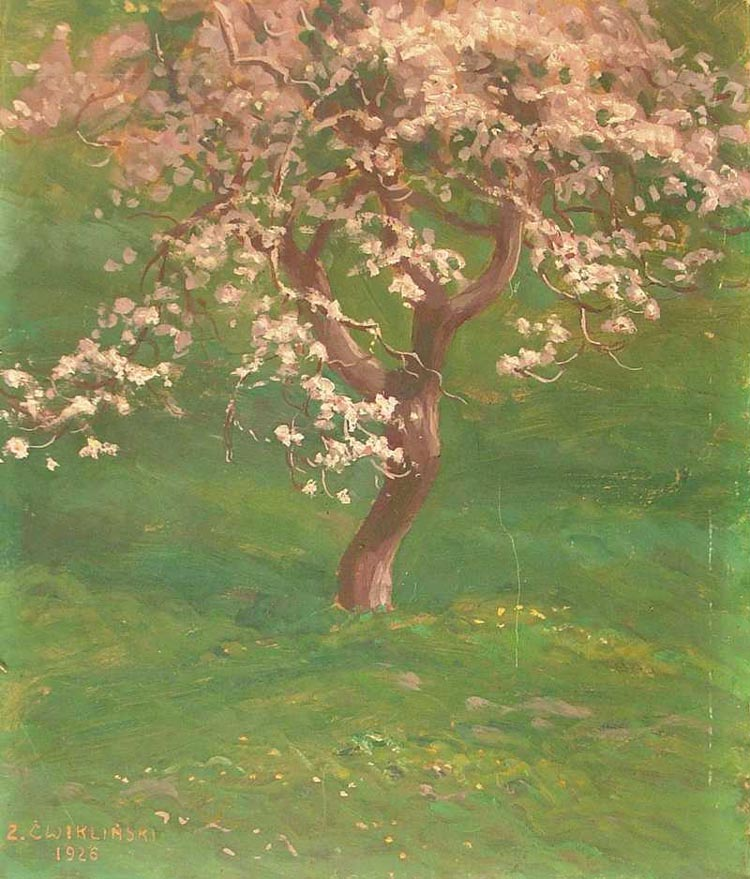
Kwitnąca jabłoń
