= Izydor Jabłoński =

Polish painter and professor

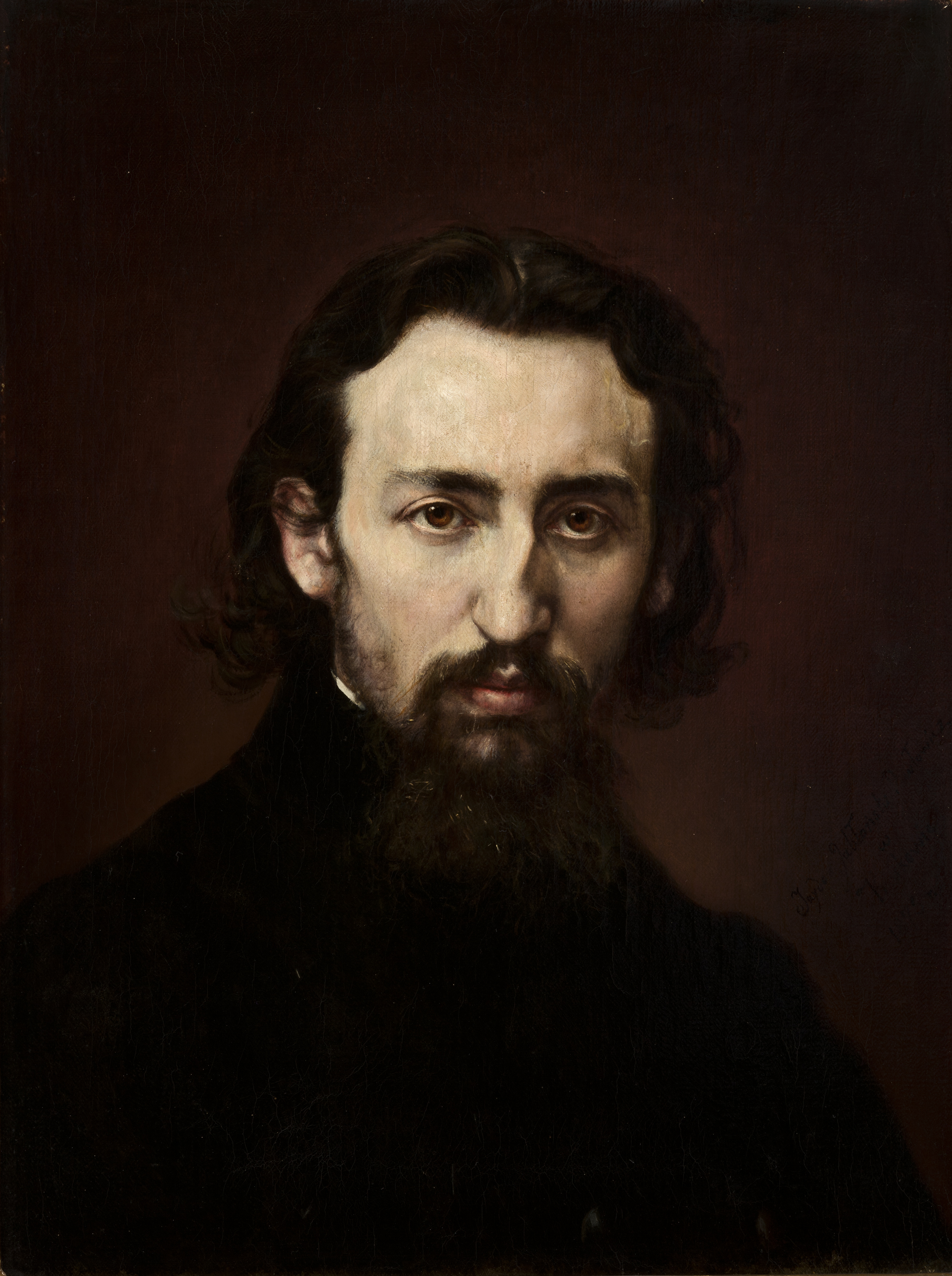
- Izydor Jabłoński
- Born: Izydor Piotr Jabłoński Pawłowicz; 4 April 1835; Kraków, Poland
- Died: 13 November 1905; Warsaw, Poland
- Education: Jan Matejko Academy of Fine Arts in Kraków
- Known for: Painting

Izydor Jabłoński (February 7, 1835 – November 13, 1905) was a Polish painter, professor at the Jan Matejko Academy of Fine Arts in Kraków, friend and biographer of Jan Matejko.

== Biography ==
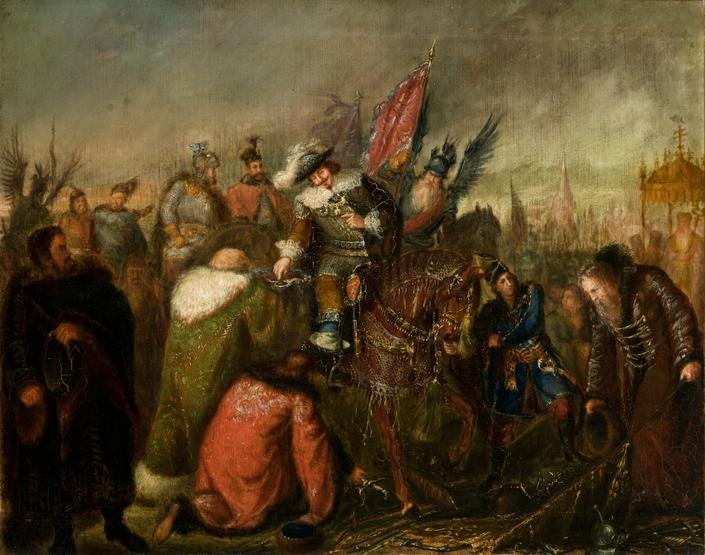
Władysław IV after the Siege of Smolensk

He was born in Kraków. From 1848 to 1856, he studied at the Jan Matejko Academy of Fine Arts in Kraków, where he was taught drawing and painting by Wojciech Stattler and Władysław Łuszczkiewicz, and sculpture by Henryk Kossowski. He completed his further studies in Munich and Rome. In the years of 1860 to 1861, he travelled around the Balkans and the Near East; and in 1873 around Russia. Between 1877 and 1899, he was a professor at the Jan Matejko Academy of Fine Arts.

His paintings are themed around religion, and he made many polychromes for churches in Lesser Poland. During his time as professor, he taught many artists which lived in Kraków at the time, inter alia: Józef Mehoffer, Edward Okuń, Wojciech Weiss, Ludwik Stasiak, Stanisław Wyspiański, and Zefiryn Ćwikliński. In 1879, he was the director of the Society of Friends of Fine Arts (Towarzystwo Przyjaciół Sztuk Pięknych) in Kraków.

He died in Kraków and was buried in the Rakowicki Cemetery, in the tomb of the Szubertów Family, in the Fifth Quarter.

In the Holy Cross Church (Kościół Świętego Krzyża) in Kraków, there is an epitaph for the Jabłonski Family, for Izydor Jabłoński and his brother Leon Jabłoński – a sculptor.
