= Bochnia =

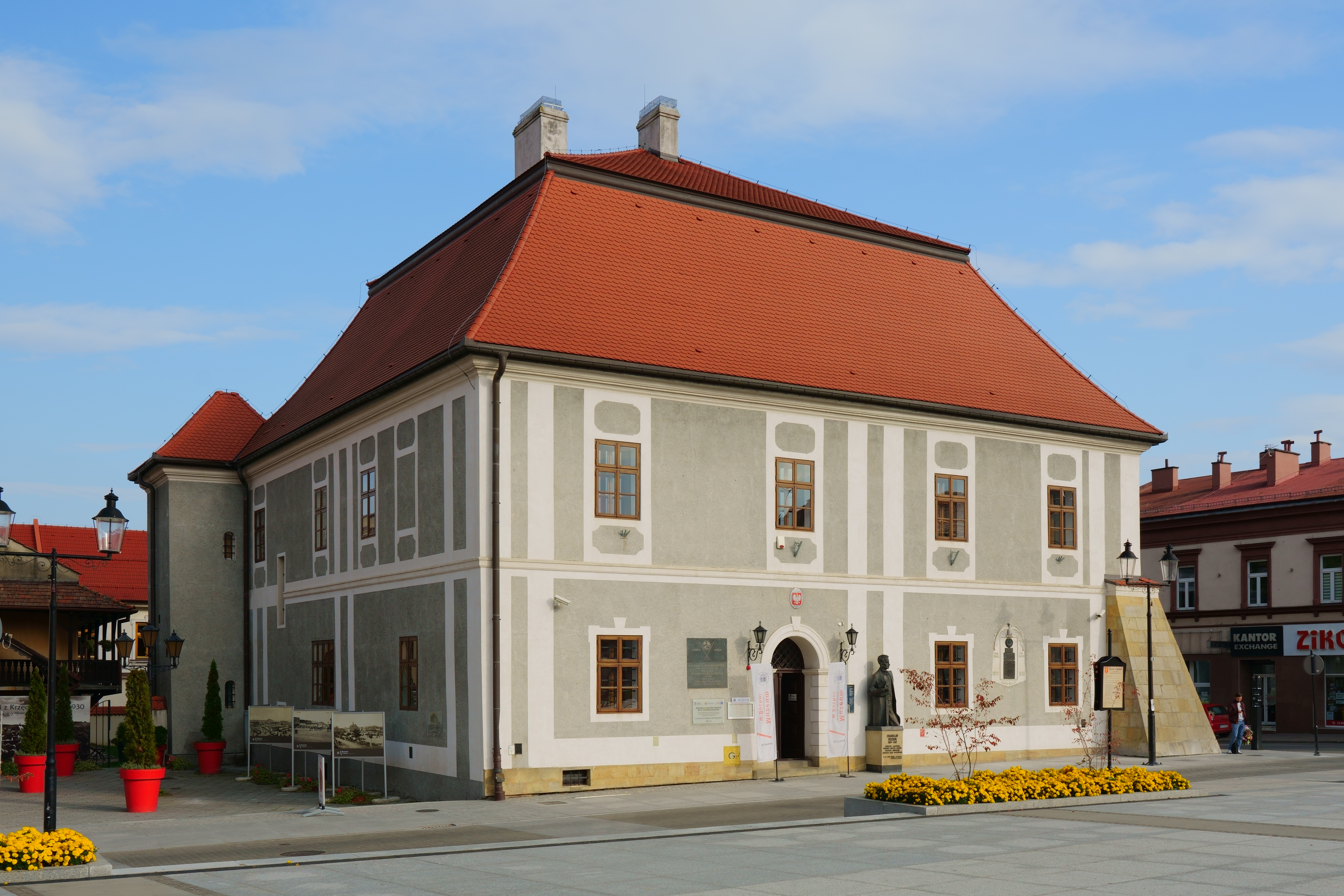
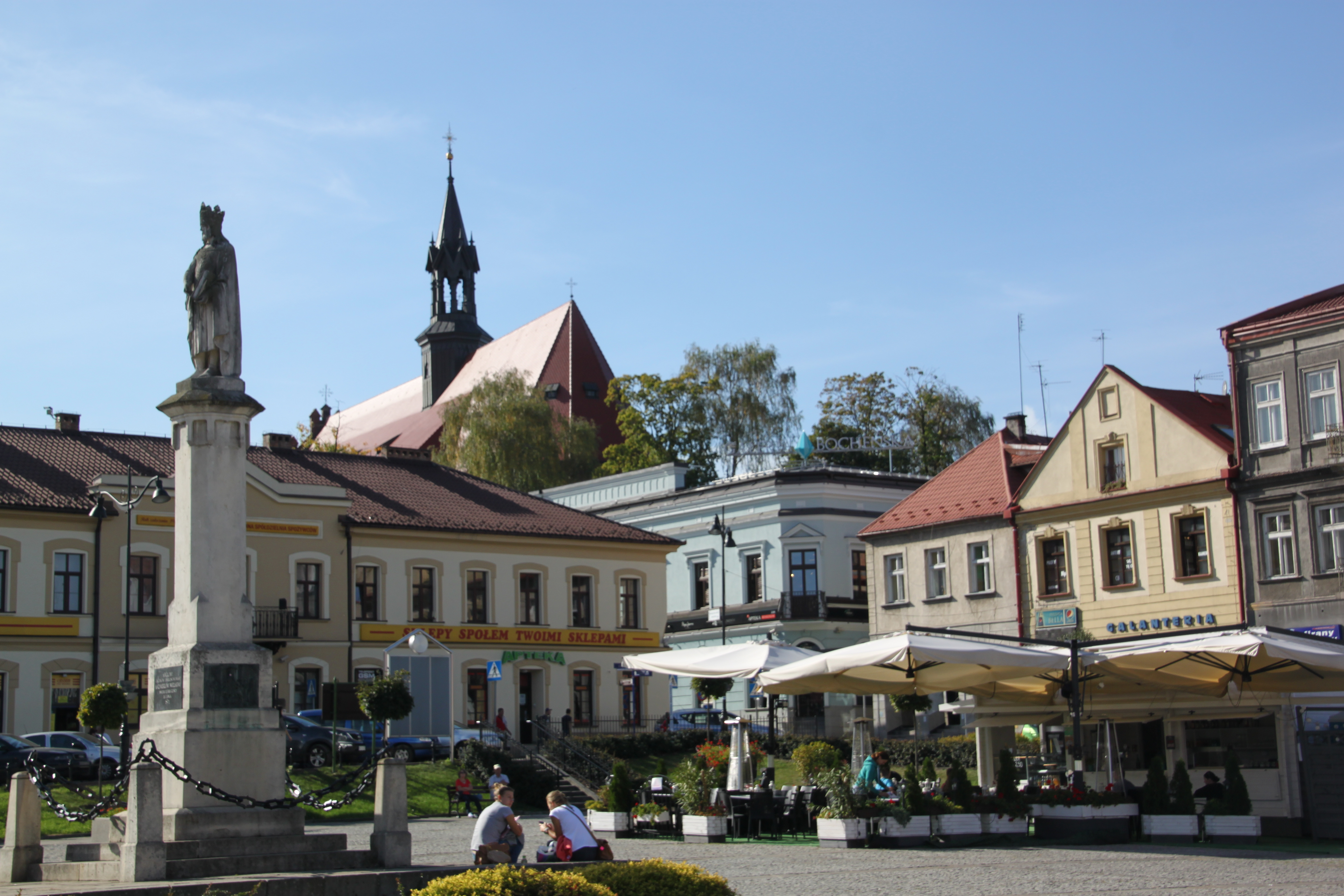
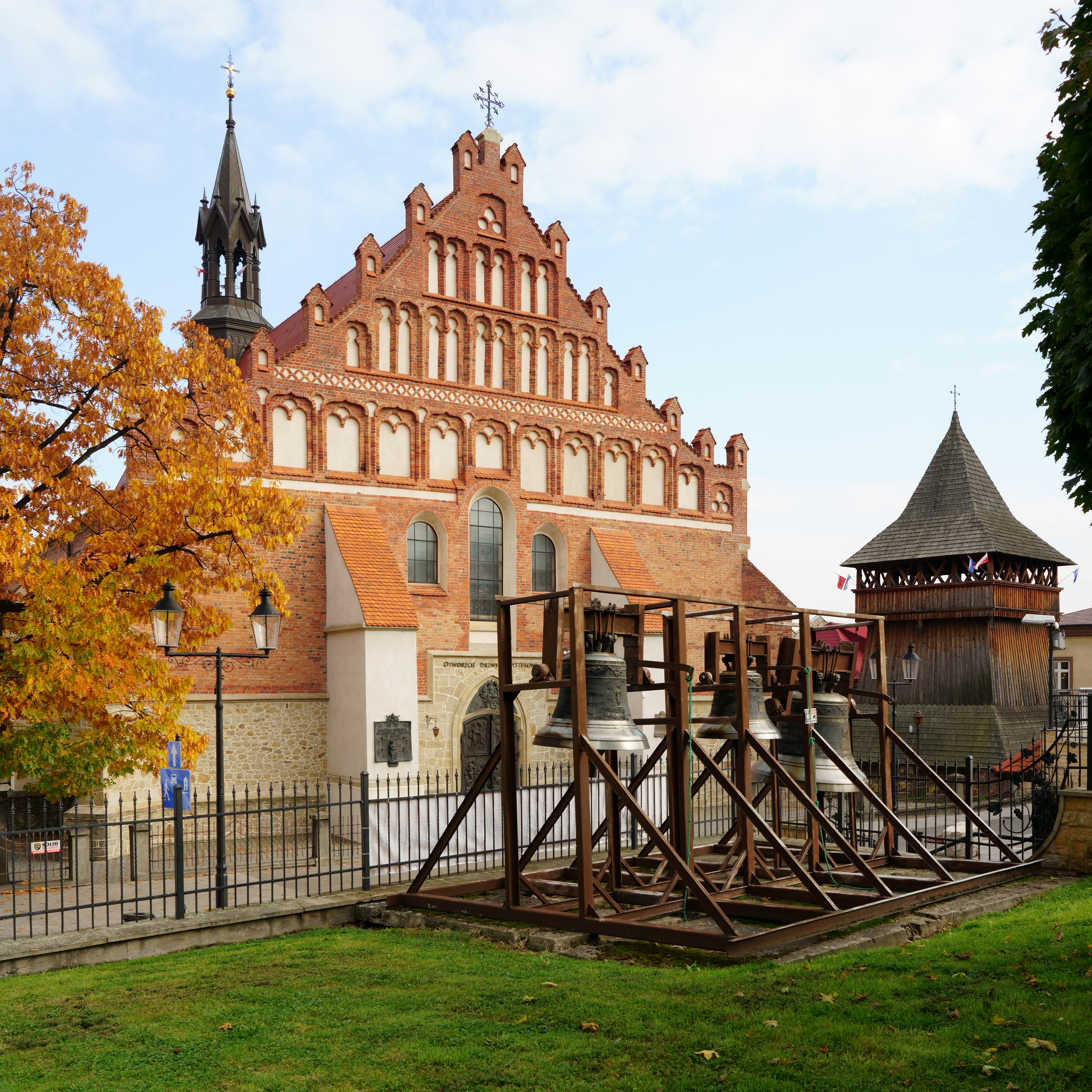
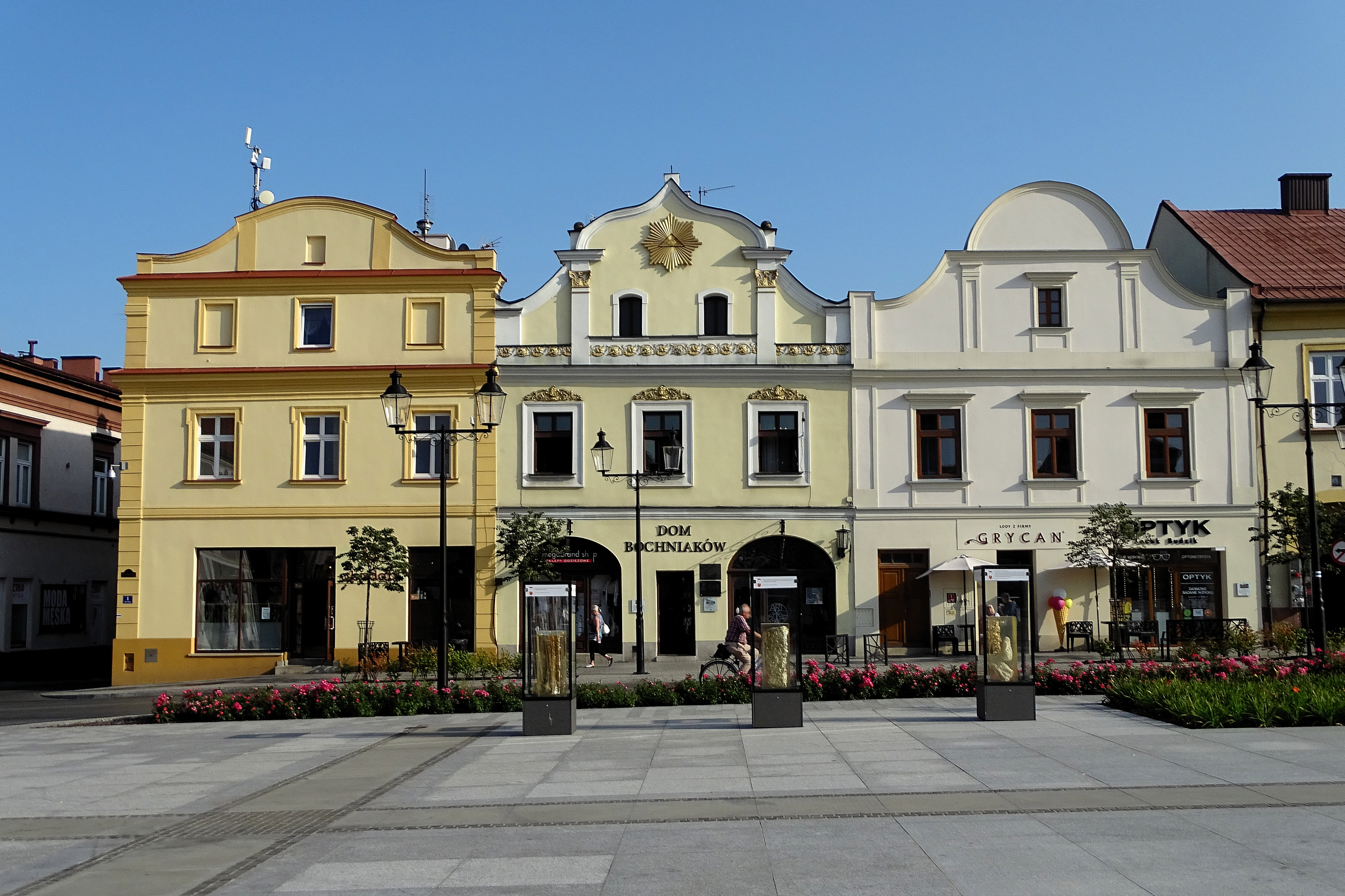
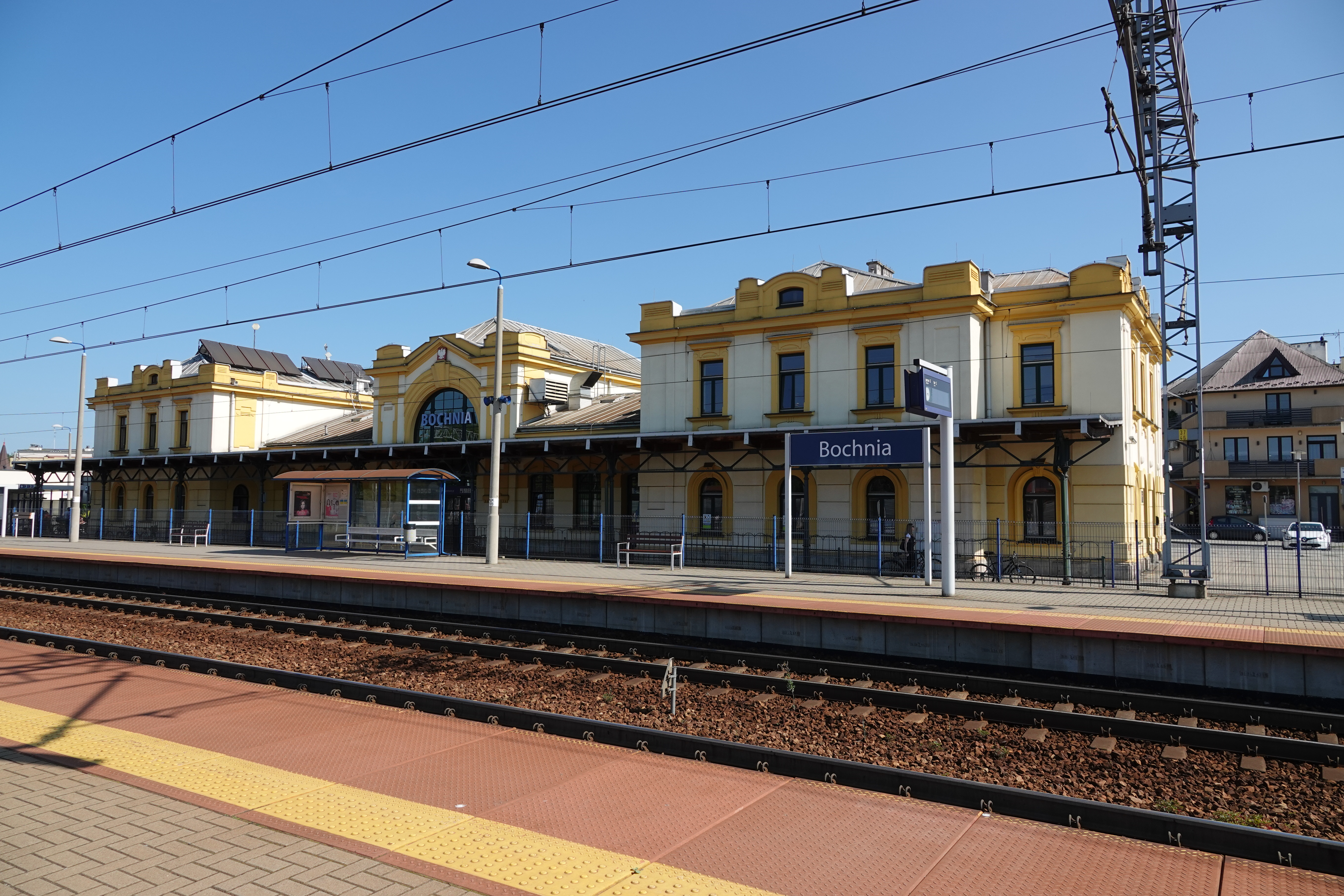
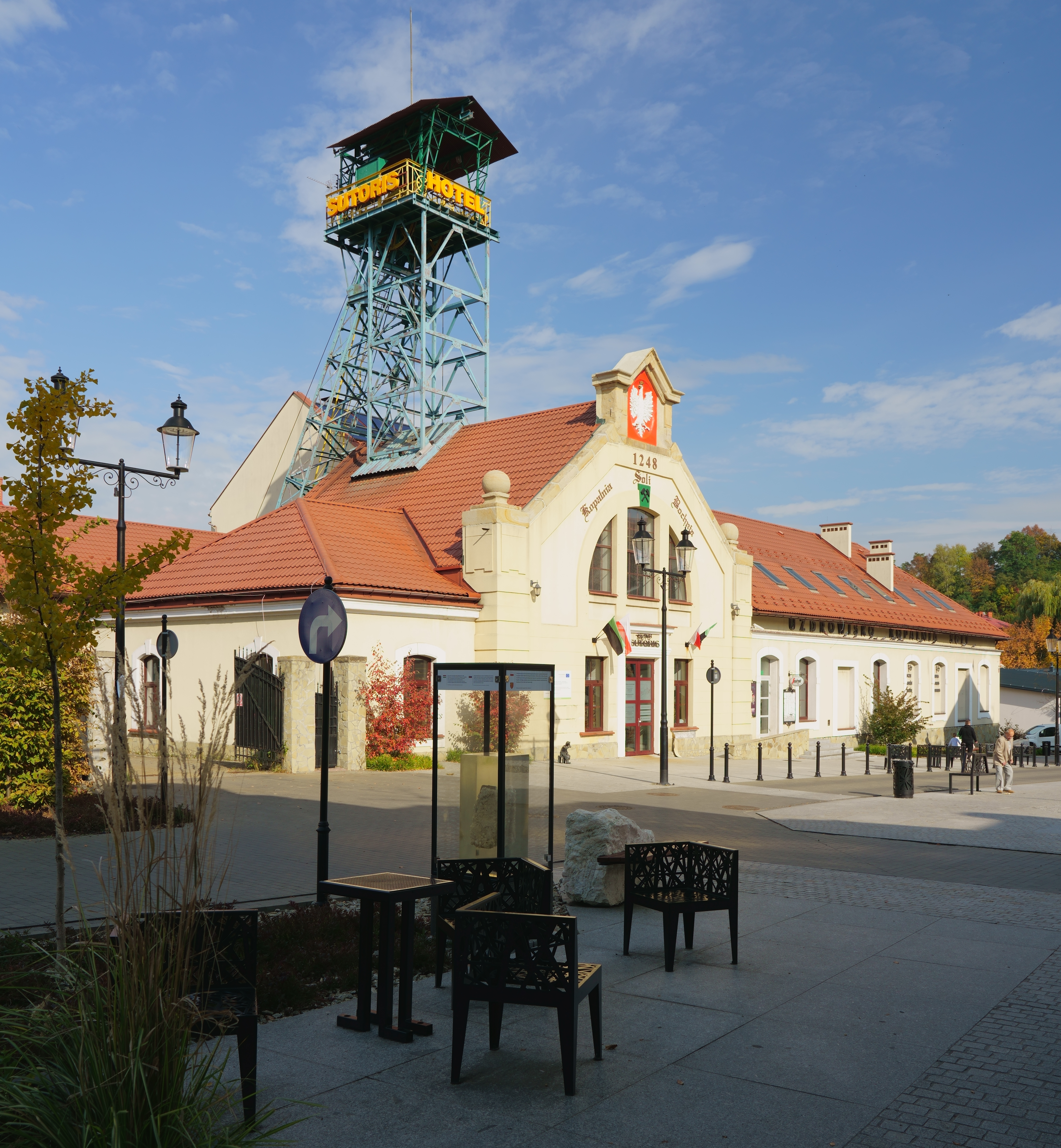
- Museum Marketplace Basilica Weigh houses Railway station Salt Mine

- Flag Coat of arms
- Interactive map of Bochnia
- Location within Poland
- Coordinates: 49°59′N 20°26′E
- Country: Poland
- Voivodeship: Lesser Poland
- County: Bochnia
- Gmina: Bochnia (urban gmina)
- First mentioned: 1198
- Town rights: 1253

Government
  - Mayor: Magdalena Łacna (PO)

Area
  - Total: 29.87 km^{2} (11.53 sq mi)

Population (31 December 2021)
  - Total: 29,317
  - Density: 981/km^{2} (2,540/sq mi)
- Time zone: UTC+1 (CET)
  - Summer (DST): UTC+2 (CEST)
- Postal code: 32-700
- Area code: +48 14
- Car plates: KBC
- Website: www.bochnia.pl

Bochnia [ˈbɔxɲa] is a town on the river Raba in southern Poland, administrative seat of Bochnia County in Lesser Poland Voivodeship. Bochnia is most noted for its salt mine, the oldest functioning in Europe, built in the 13th century, a World Heritage Site and a Historic Monument of Poland.

As of December 2021, Bochnia has a population of 29,317 and an area of 29.87 square kilometres (11.53 sq mi).

== History ==
Bochnia is one of the oldest cities of Lesser Poland. The first known source mentioning the city is a letter of 1198, in which Aymar the Monk, Latin Patriarch of Jerusalem, confirmed a donation by the local magnate Mikora Gryfit to the monastery of the Order of the Holy Sepulchre in Miechów. The discovery of major deposits of rock salt at the site of the present mine in 1248 led to the grant of city privileges (Magdeburg rights) on 27 February 1253 by Bolesław V the Chaste. In the original founding document, the German name of the town (Salzberg) is mentioned as well, since many Bochnia's residents were German-speaking settlers from Lower Silesia.

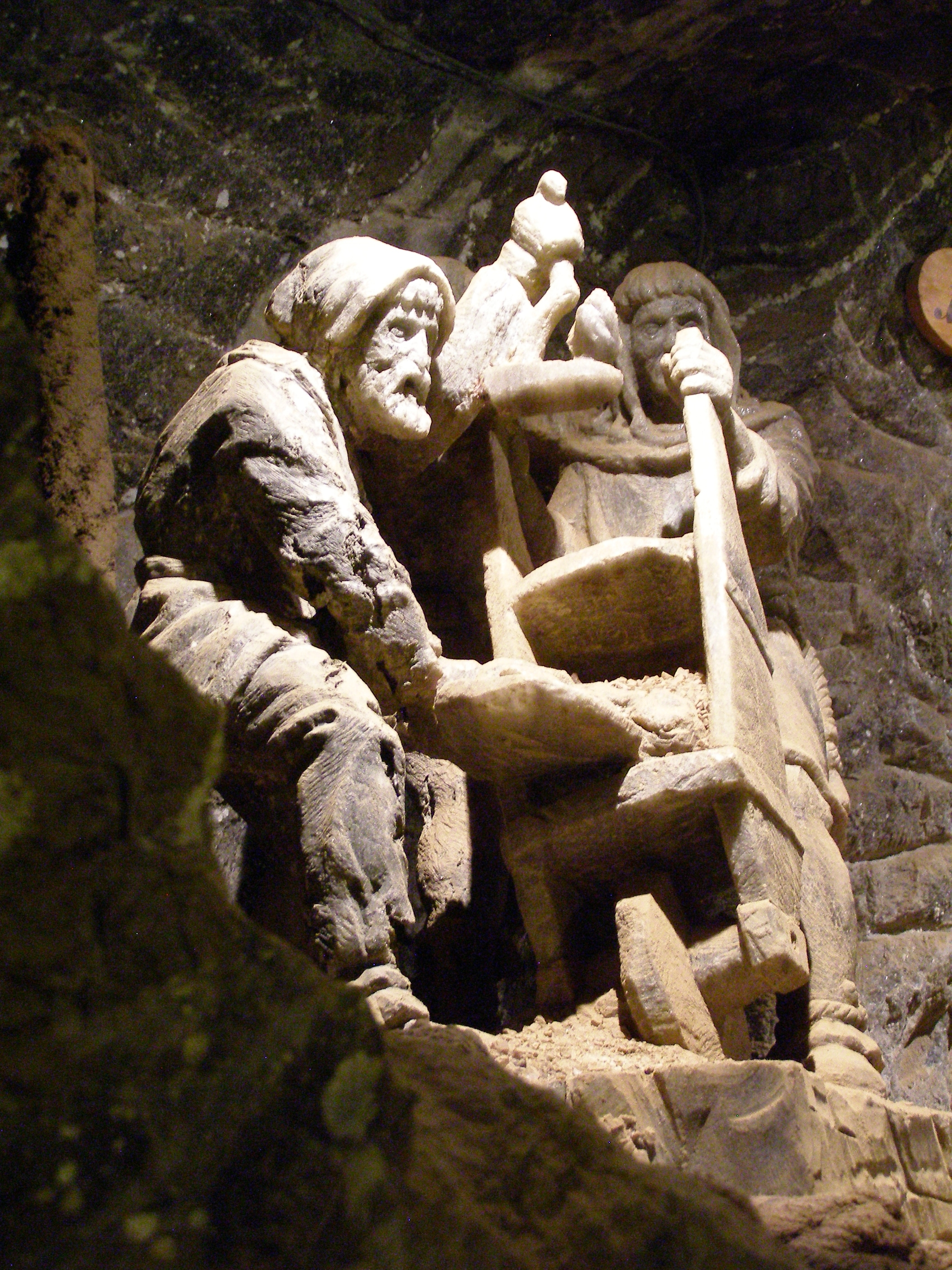
Rock salt sculptures at the Bochnia Salt Mine

Due to its salt mine and favourable location, Bochnia, which belonged to the Kraków Voivodeship, was one of main cities of Lesser Poland. In the 14th century, during the reign of King Casimir the Great, a town hall was built, a defensive wall with four gates, a hospital and shelter for miners, and the construction of St. Nicolas Basilica began. In appreciation of Casimir's influence on the development of Bochnia, monument to him was erected in town's market square in the late 19th century. In the 15th century, a school was opened, and in 1623, Bernardine Abbey was founded in Bochnia. At that time, many pilgrims from Lesser Poland, Silesia, Spiš and Orava visited the town, to see a miraculous painting of St. Mary, kept at a local Dominican church.

In 1561 Bochnia burned down in a fire and its salt deposits were depleted, leading to the town's decline. During the Deluge, in 1655 Bochnia was captured by the Swedes, in 1657 by the Transylvanians, and in 1662, by the Cossacks. By the 1660s, there were only 54 houses still standing. In 1702, the town was destroyed in the Great Northern War. Fires caused further damage in 1709 and 1751. In 1772, Bochnia was annexed by the Habsburg monarchy (Austria) in the First Partition of Poland, and remained part of Galicia (the Austrian Partition of Poland) until 1918. It became the seat of the Bochnier Kreis, one of the roughly 18 (the exact number varied) primary subdivisions of Galicia until 1860. The Austrians liquidated both abbeys, and tore down the town hall together with the defensive wall. In 1867, Bochnia County was created and the town began a slow recovery spurred by construction of the Galician Railway of Archduke Charles Louis. In 1886, first public library was opened, in the late 19th century, the waterworks, and in 1913, a movie theater.

Poland regained independence in 1918, and in the Second Polish Republic, Bochnia belonged to Kraków Voivodeship and was the capital of a county. In 1918, the Polish 15th Wolves Infantry Regiment was formed in Bochnia. The town housed a small garrison of the Polish Army, with 3rd Silesian Uhlans Regiment stationed there from 1924.

=== World War II ===
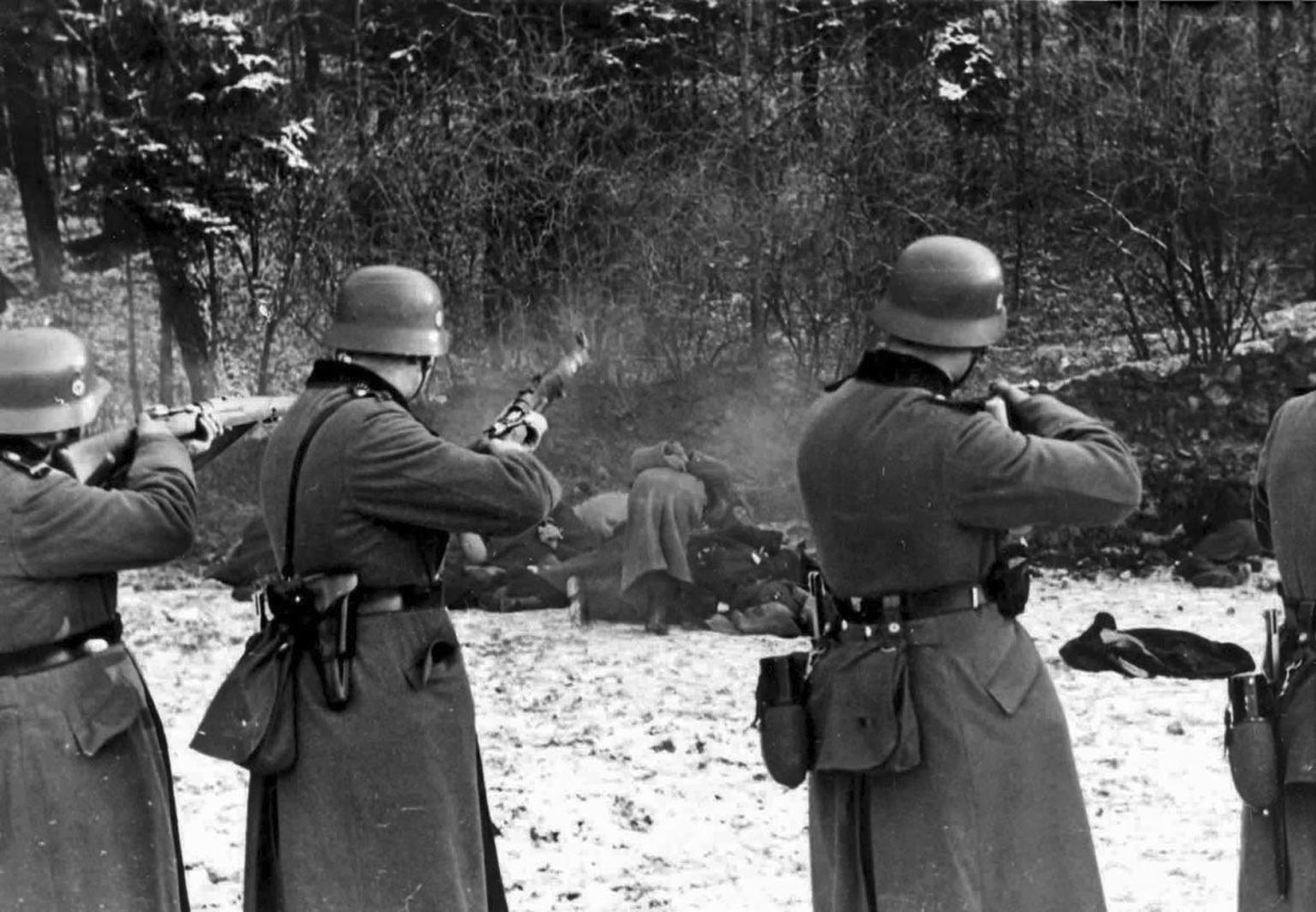
Execution of 56 Polish hostages in Bochnia during German occupation of Poland, December 18, 1939

During the German invasion of Poland, which started World War II, on September 6–7, 1939, Bochnia was defended by several Polish units. The Einsatzgruppe I entered the town shortly after to commit various crimes against the population. One of the first mass executions in occupied Poland took place in the town: the Germans shot 52 Poles as a reprisal for killing two German police officers. In 1939 the Germans operated a Dulag transit camp for some 1,000 Polish prisoners of war in the town.

At the outbreak of World War II, an estimated 3,500 Jews lived in Bochnia, comprising about 20% of the total population. During the German occupation of Poland, Bochnia was the site of a Nazi Jewish ghetto (the Bochnia Ghetto) to which Jews from surrounding areas were forced to move by the Nazis. The entire Jewish community was murdered in the Holocaust apart from 200 forced laborers employed at a plant headed by Gerhard Kurzbach, a Wehrmacht soldier, who ordered them to work overtime and thereby saved them from deportation. It is estimated that approximately 15,000 Jews were deported from Bochnia, with at least a further 1,800 killed in the town and its surroundings. About 90 Jews from Bochnia survived the war, either in hiding, in camps or in the Soviet Union. Most of them emigrated to the United States, Brazil, Belgium, and Israel.

In April 1943, Polish wartime hero Witold Pilecki hid there after his escape from the Auschwitz concentration camp. In 1944, the 12th Home Army Infantry Regiment was established in Bochnia. In 1944, during and following the Warsaw Uprising, the Germans carried out deportations of Varsovians from the Dulag 121 camp in Pruszków, where they were initially imprisoned, to Bochnia. Those Poles were mainly old people, ill people and women with children.

The Jewish family of Tiders expelled from Zaborowo in 1940 were murdered in Brześć with children except for their oldest son, 24-year-old Mendel Tider, who paved the road to Tamowo on German orders at the time of the killings. He escaped to Bochnia where he met Józef Langdorf from his neighbourhood. Together, they escaped back to Zaborowo and found refuge at the farm of the Mika family of six. Both survived, treated like relatives and fed for free until liberation. In 2000 the three members of the Mika family were bestowed the titles of the Righteous thanks to Mrs Langdorf from Israel. Stefan Mika was 73, and living in Kraków; the other two, father and mother, were already dead for several decades.

=== Recent period ===
Although Poland was liberated from Germany, it fell to the Soviet sphere of influence, and the Soviets installed a communist regime, which remained in power until 1989. The Polish anti-communist resistance movement was active in Bochnia. In the following decades, Bochnia grew larger, with several villages incorporated into the town, mostly in the 1970s. In 1984, a by-pass of the European route E40 was completed, redirecting the traffic from congested center of the town. From 1975 to 1998 it was administratively part of the Tarnów Voivodeship.

== Landmarks ==
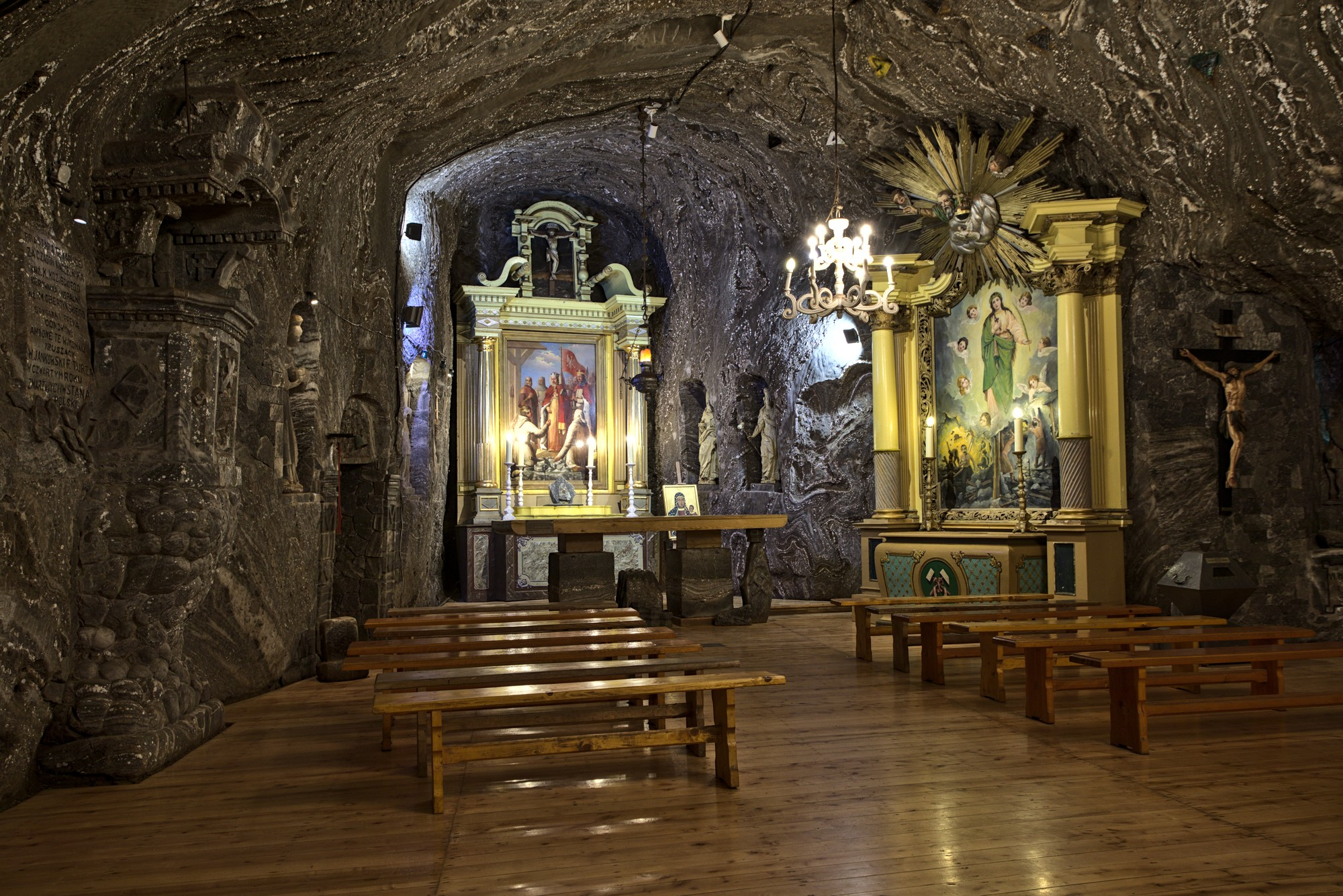
An underground church in the Bochnia Salt Mine, a UNESCO World Heritage Site.

=== Salt mine ===
The Bochnia Salt Mine (Polish: kopalnia soli w Bochni) is one of the oldest salt mines in the world and the oldest one in Poland and Europe. The mine was established between the 12th and 13th centuries after salt was discovered in Bochnia. The mines measure 4.5 kilometres (2.8 miles) in length and 468 metres (1,535 feet) in depth at 16 different levels. Deserted chambers, shafts and passages form a so-called underground town, which is now open to sightseers. The largest of the preserved chambers has been converted into a sanatorium.

=== Other landmarks ===
- St. Nicholas Basilica - built in the 1st half of the 15th century, and then reconstructed after the fires that occurred in the years 1447, ca. 1485 and 1655. Late Gothic with Baroque and Rococo interior
- Stanisław Fischer Museum - former Dominican monastery, Baroque
- Art Nouveau railway station
- Statues of Leopold Okulicki and Casimir III of Poland
- The older parts of the cemetery at Oracka Street
- Jewish cemetery
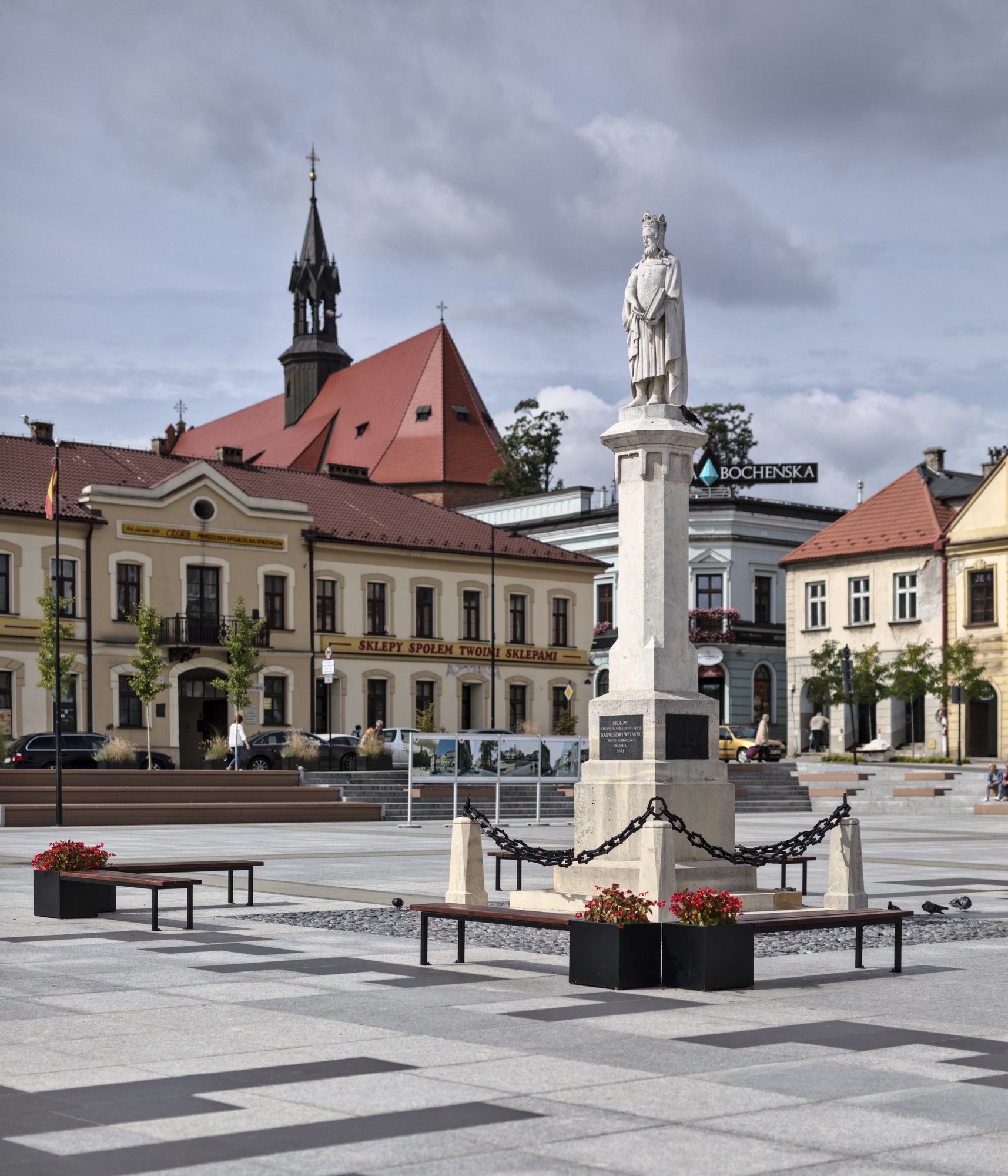
Main square with the Casimir the Great monument

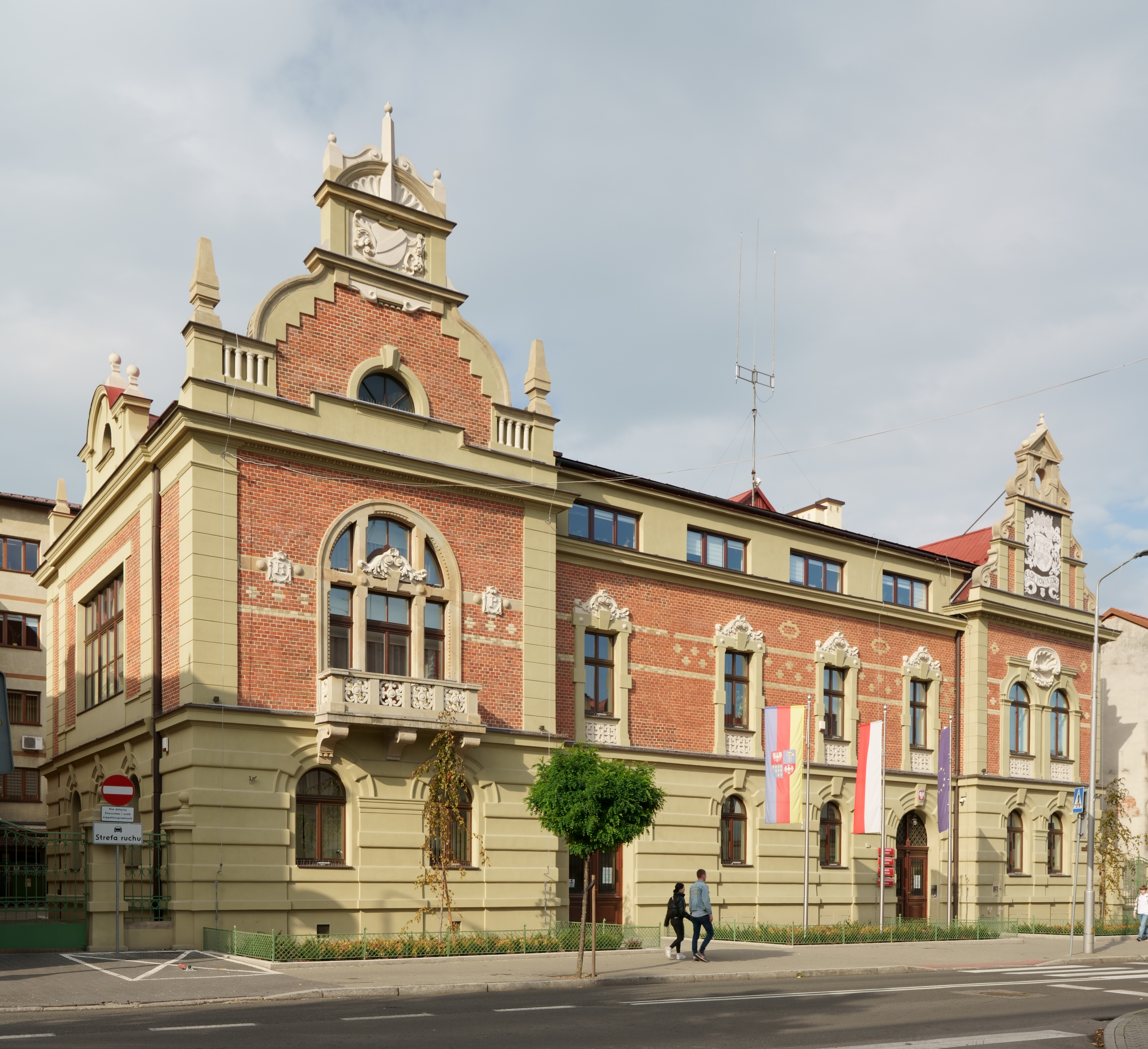
Powiat Office

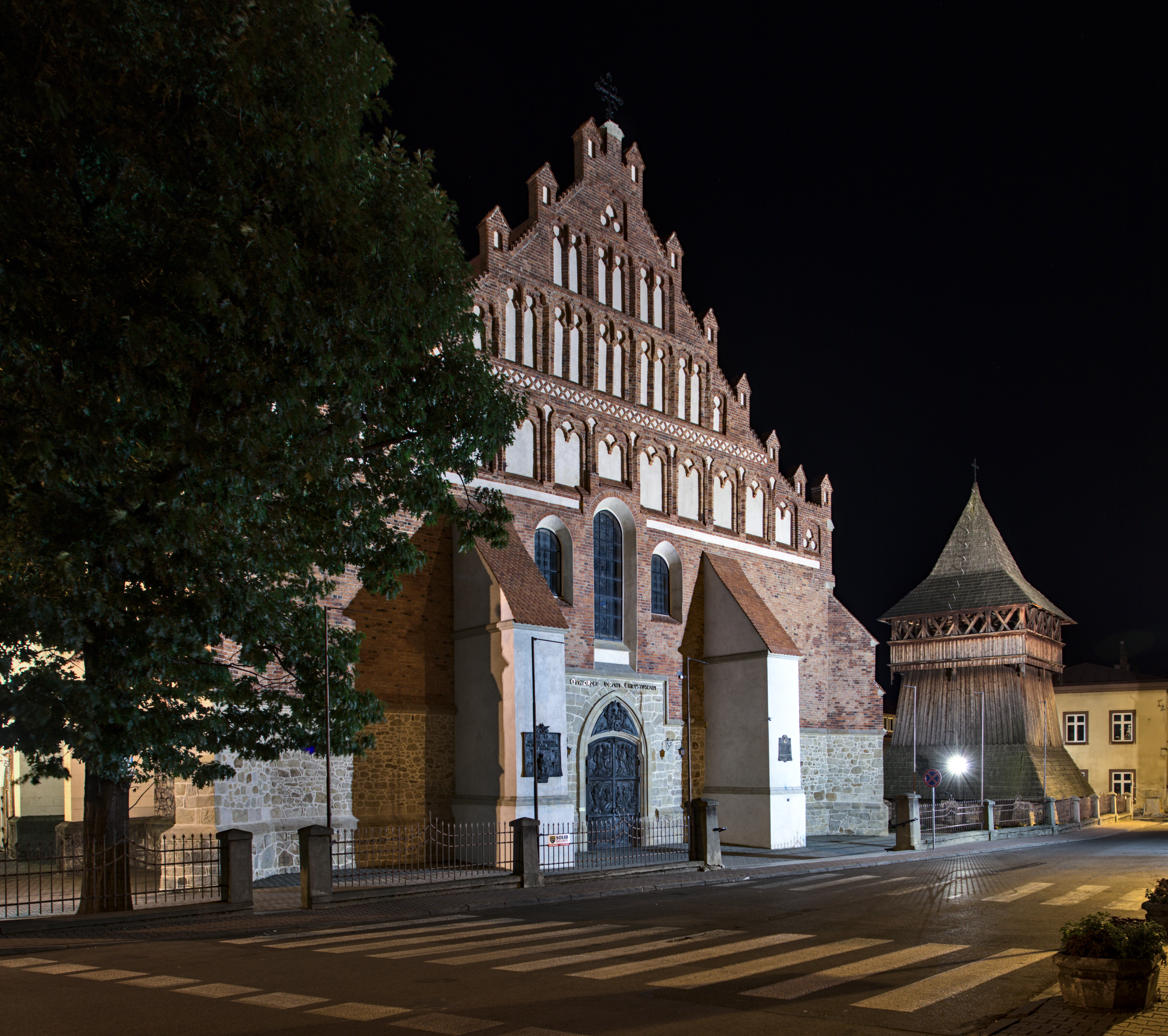
St. Nicholas' Basilica

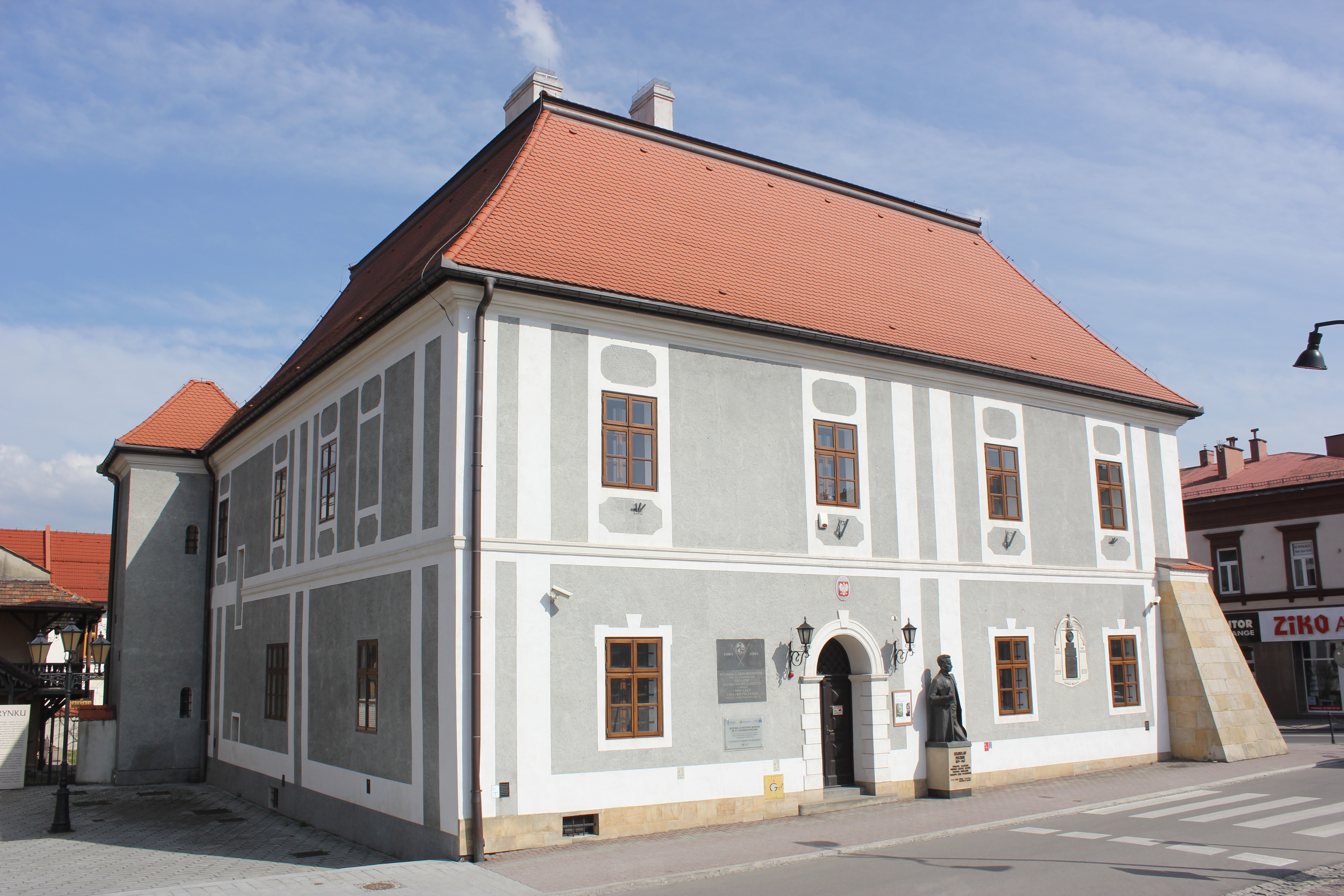
Stanisław Fischer Museum

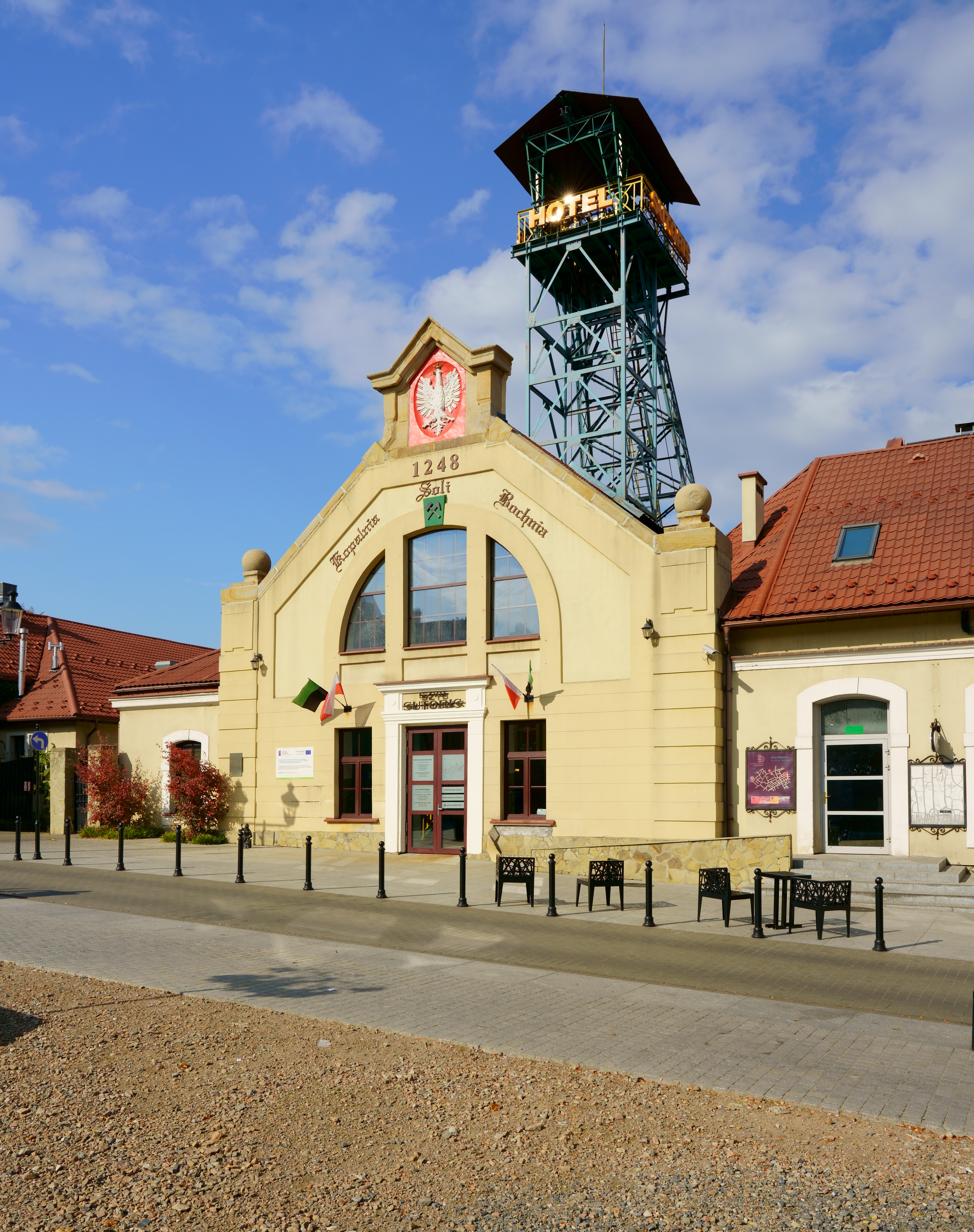
Bochnia Salt Mine

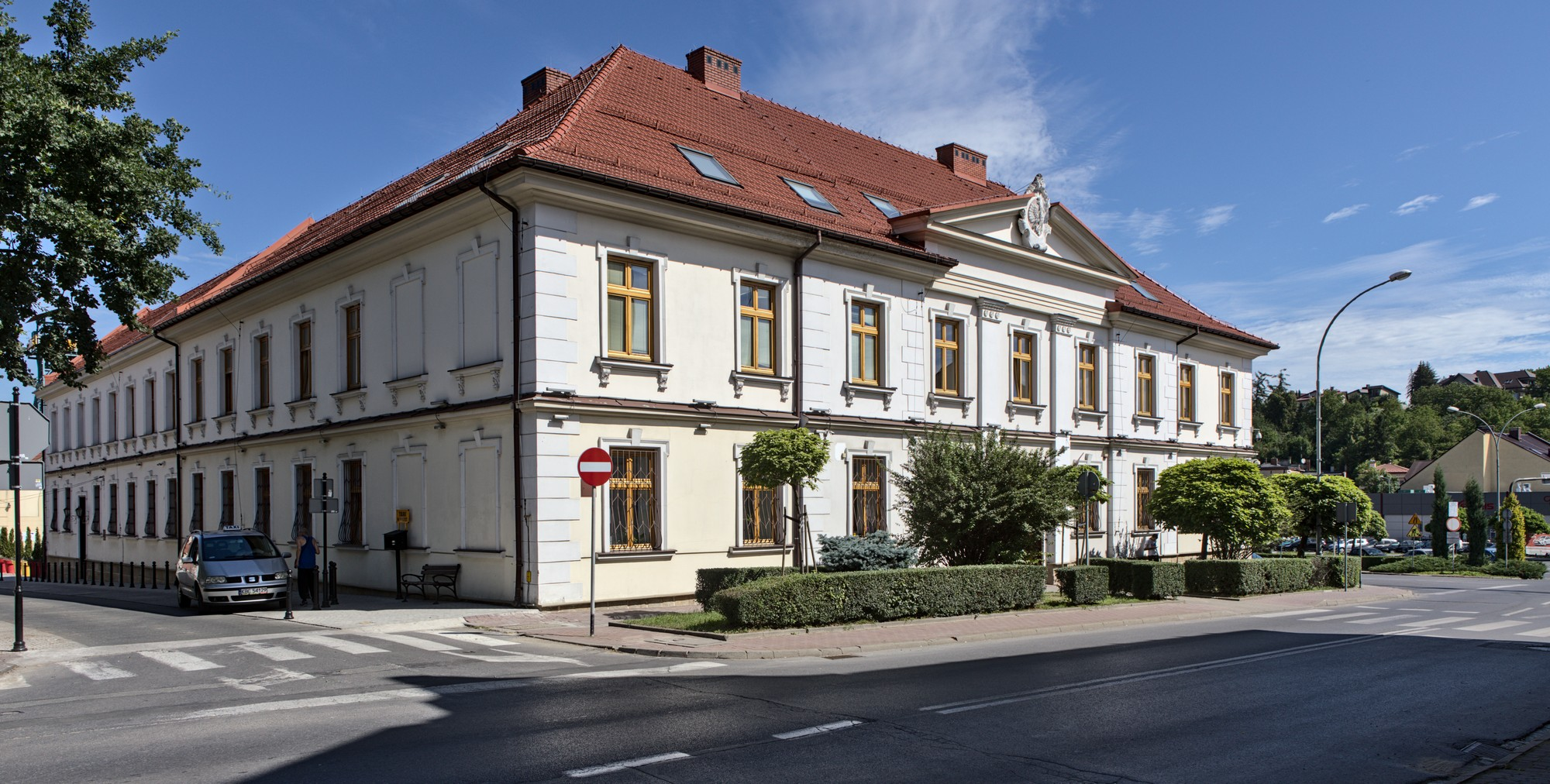
Local courthouse

== Transport ==
=== Road transport ===
The A4 motorway, which is also a part of the European route E40, passes north to the town. Other roads include: national road 75, national road 94 and voivodeship road 965.

=== Rail transport ===
The railway line 91 (Kraków-Medyka) passes through the town.

== Education ==
Bochnia Academy of Economics (Wyższa Szkoła Ekonomiczna w Bochni) is a privately owned collegiate-level institution of higher education in the city, founded in 2000. It grants bachelor's degrees (licencjat) in two fields of knowledge: economics, finance and accounting.

== Sports ==
The local football club is Bocheński KS. It competes in the lower leagues.

== Twin towns – sister cities ==
Bochnia is twinned with:

- Bad Salzdetfurth, Germany
- Kežmarok, Slovakia
- Roselle, United States

== Notable residents ==
- Stanislaus of Szczepanów (1030–1079), Poland's first native saint
- Ralph Modjeski (Rudolf Modrzejewski) (1861–1940), engineer, born 1861 to actress Helena Modjeska, builder of 30 major bridges in the USA
- Roman Vetulani (1849–1908), Polish scholar
- Ludwik Stasiak (1858–1924), Polish painter, writer and publicist
- Elżbieta Ciechanowska (1875–1948), Polish women's rights and labor activist, musician and poet
- Salo Landau (1903–1944), Dutch national chess champion

== See also ==
- Bochnia Salt Mine
- Wieliczka Salt Mine
