= Kazimierz Stabrowski =

Polish painter (1869–1929)

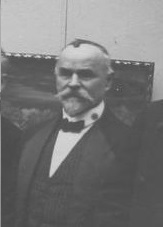
- Born: Kazimierz Stabrowski; 10 November 1869; Kruplyany, Grodno Governorate, Russian Empire
- Died: 10 June 1929; Garwolin, Poland
- Education: Imperial Academy of Arts in St. Petersburg
- Known for: Painting
- Movement: Symbolism
- Spouse: Julia Janiszewska (1902)

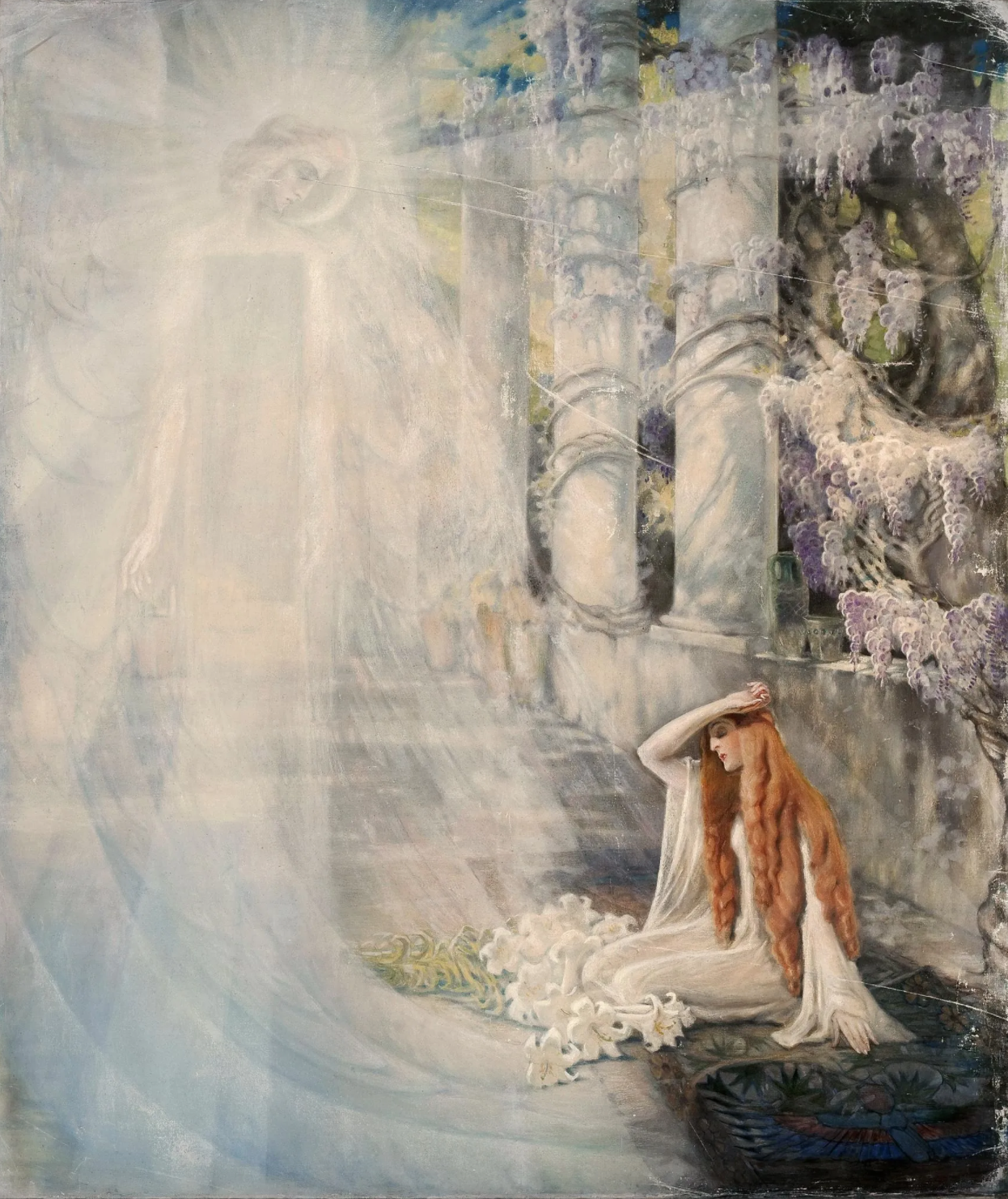
Vision II- sketch for the "Annunciation" (1910)

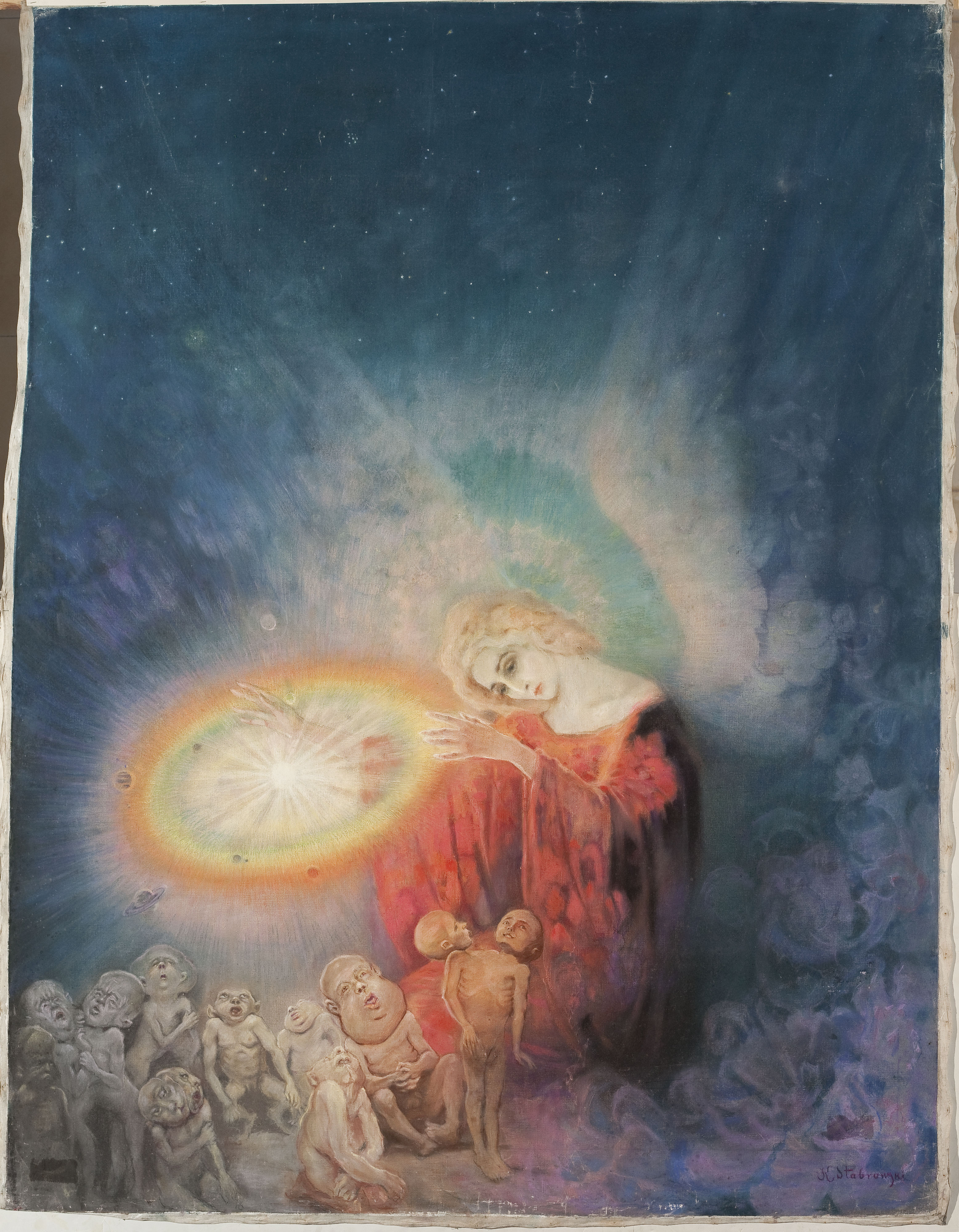
Consoler of monsters

Kazimierz Stabrowski (November 21, 1869, Kruplyany – June 10, 1929, Garwolin) was a Polish painter, and director of the Academy of Fine Arts in Warsaw. He also founded the first lodges of the Theosophical Society in Poland.

== Biography ==
Kazimierz Stabrowski came from a Polish landed gentry (ziemiaństwo) family. His father Antoni was a military in the Russian Army and his mother Zofia Pilecka came from a rich Polish family.

In the years 1880 to 1887, he completed his education in Białystok, after which he studied at the Imperial Academy of Arts in St. Petersburg, where he was taught by Pavel Chistyakov, later (from 1895) in Ilya Repin's workshop. At the academy he gained contacts with numerous Polish painters, inter alia with Ferdynand Ruszczyc, Kazimierz Wasilkowski, Henryk Weyssenhoff, and Stanisław Bohusz-Siestrzeńcewicz, as well as with Russians.

In 1893, he went on artist travels to the East, Beirut, and Palestine, in which he visited Odessa, Istanbul, Greece, and Egypt. Throughout his journey, he gathered a portfolio of work, he did his diploma painting Muhammad in the desert (The escape from Mecca) (Mahomet na pustyni (Ucieczka z Mekki)) during his travels. In the years of 1897 to 1898, he did his further studies at the Académie Julian in France; it is there where he met numerous academics inter alia Jean-Joseph Benjamin-Constant, and Jean-Paul Laurens, and has been introduced into the artistic movements of Impressionism and Fauvism. In Paris he also became interested in the philosophy of Henri Bergson. After coming back to St. Petersburg, he participated in the regional sphere of artists, where he made numerous artworks, which he exhibited inter alia Paris, (at the World's fair in 1900), Munich (1901), and Venice (1903).

In 1902, he married Julia Janiszewska, a sculptor, who he met at the Imperial Academy of Arts in St. Petersburg. From 1902, he became a member of the Society of Polish Artists "Sztuka" (Towarzystwo Artystów Polskich "Sztuka"). In 1903, he moved to live in Warsaw, where he engaged in organisation and pedagogue. Together with Konrad Krzyżanowski he operated a private art school, which led to the reopening of the then closed after the January Uprising, School of Fine Arts in Warsaw. The school opened on March 19, 1904. Kazimierz Stabrowski became the first director of the school, performing this function to 1909. His most famous pupil there was Lithuanian painter Mikalojus Konstantinas Čiurlionis Due to a conflict with the Pedagogue Council, and the Tutelary Committee, after being involved in Western esotericism, he dismissed himself. By that time, he was in fact the leading figure in the Theosophical Society in Poland, and had founded the first Theosophical lodges there, and he transmitted his Theosophical ideas to Čiurlionis.

The years of 1909 to 1913, marked his second artist travels, inter alia France, Germany, Sweden, Spain, Italy, and the Canary Islands. The summer months he spent with his family in Lūznava Manor (Dłużniewo), Latvia. He visited Lithuania frequently and was instrumental in organizing the first art exhibitions there.

After World War I, he moved to St. Petersburg, when in 1918, he moved back to Warsaw. After new aesthetics in Russia after World War I, his work gained criticism by pedagogues, and positive views by the journal Mir iskusstva. In the 1920s, he travelled again to find new artistic themes, to Greece, Turkey, Morocco, Bosnia, Sweden, and Norway. In 1922, he co-founded the artist group Sursum Corda. He died in 1929, he was buried at the Powązki Cemetery (Quarter 205-I-8) in Warsaw.

== Selected paintings ==
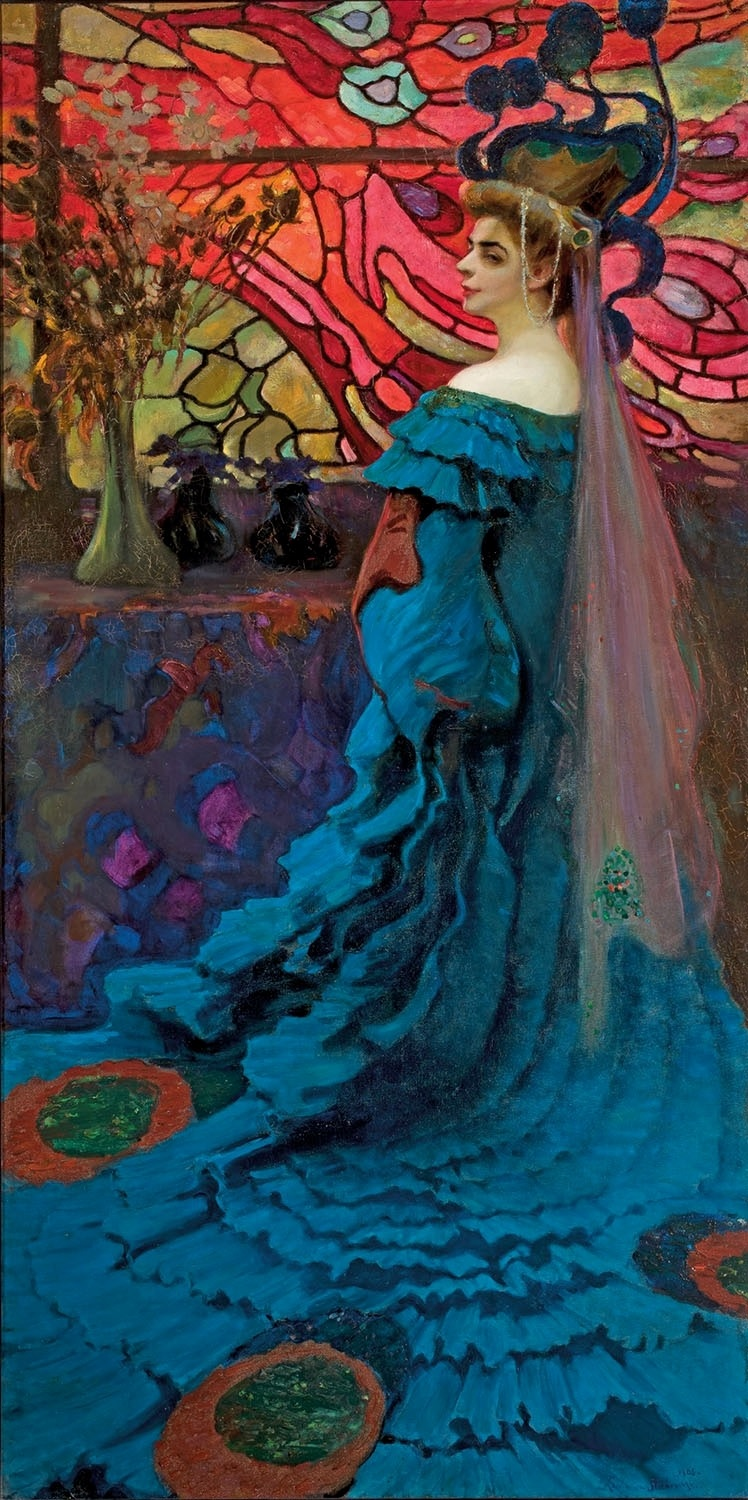
By the Stained Glass Window
(1908), National Museum in Warsaw

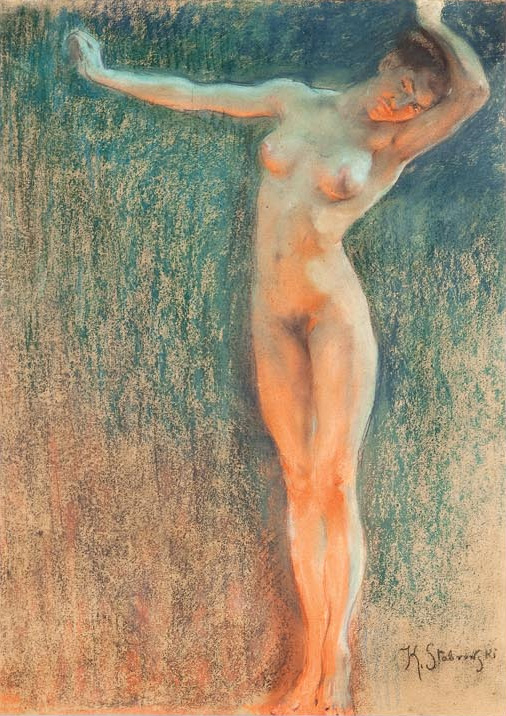
Nude - Dawn
(1902), District Museum in Toruń

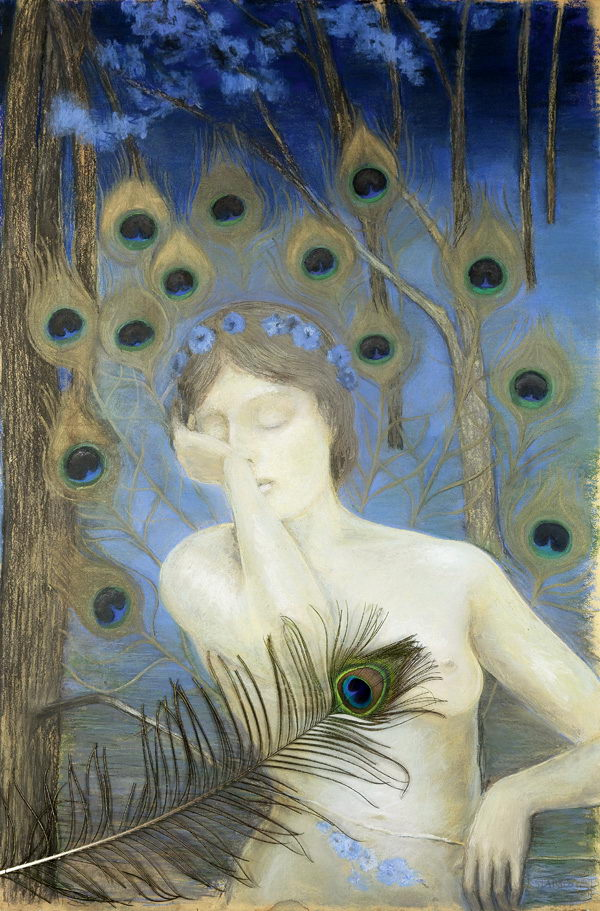
Nude with Peacock Feathers
(1900)

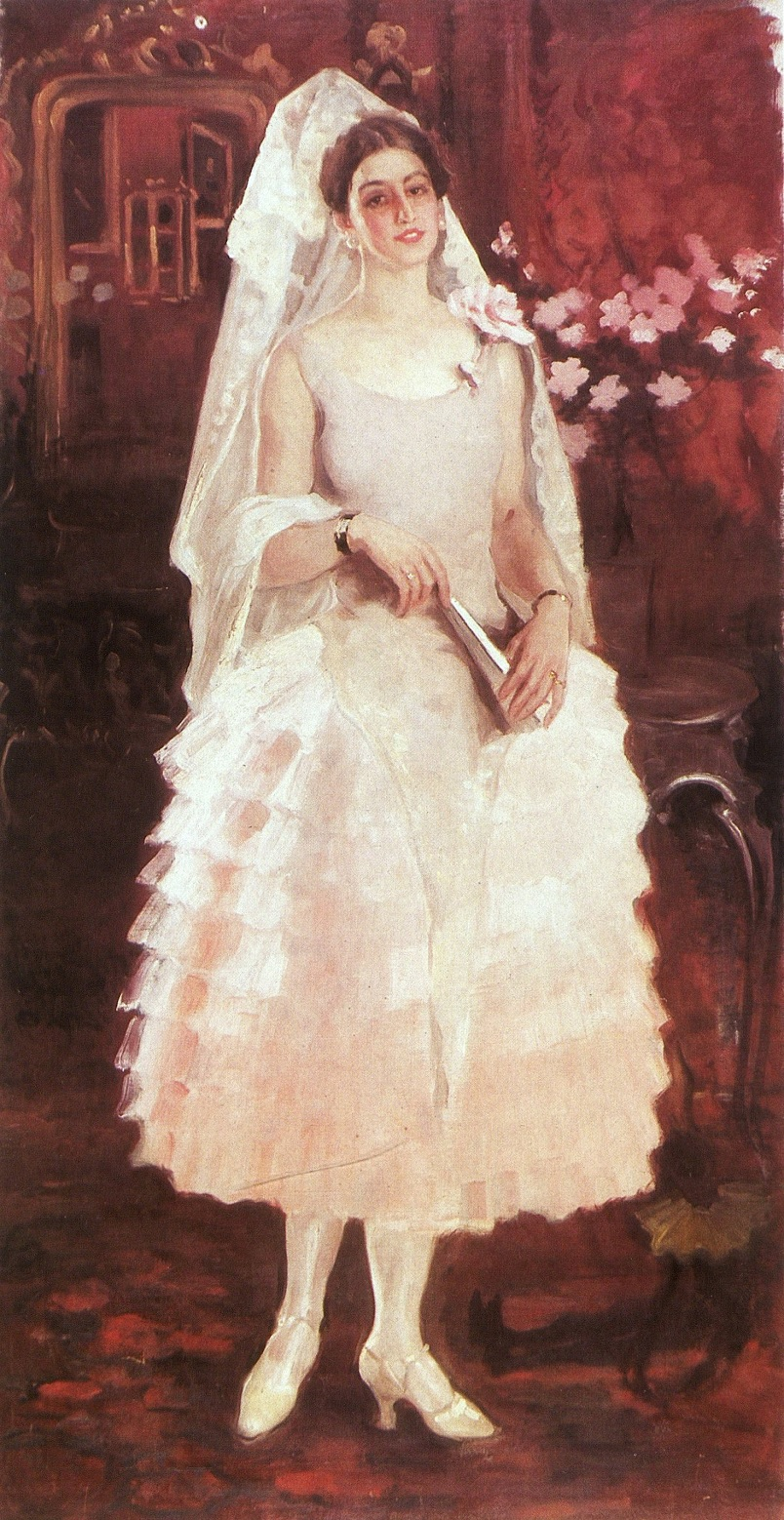
Spanish Woman
(1928)

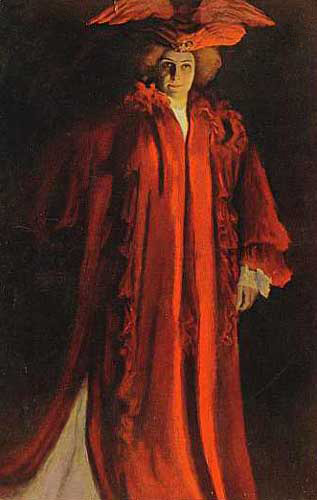
Portrait of the Actress,
Wanda Siemaszkowska
(1910)
