= Lūznava Parish =

Parish of Latvia

- parish of Latvia
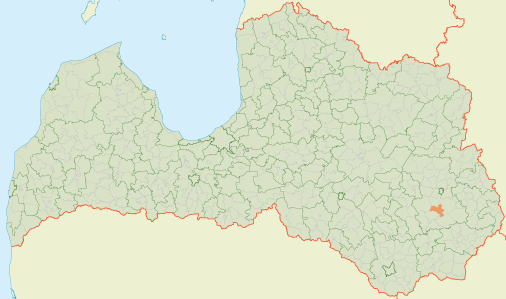
- Coordinates: 56°21′12″N 27°15′51″E
- Country: Latvia

Population (1 January 2026)
  - Total: 772
- Time zone: Eastern European Time
- Website: https://www.luznava.lv/

Lūznava Parish (Latvian: Lūznavas pagasts) is an administrative unit of the Rēzekne Municipality, Latvia. The administrative center of the parish is the village Lūznava, the main attraction is the Lūznava Manor.

== See also ==
- Lūznava Manor
