= Stanisław Fabijański =

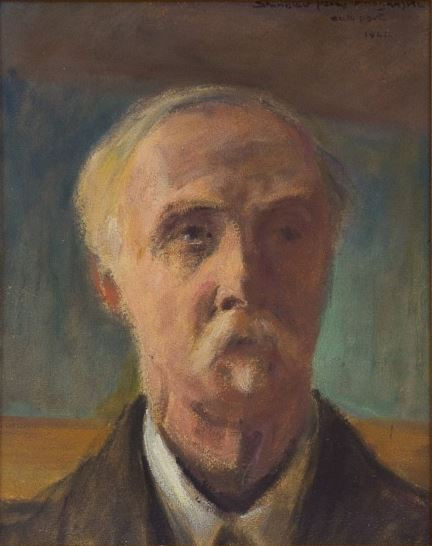
Self-portrait (1941)

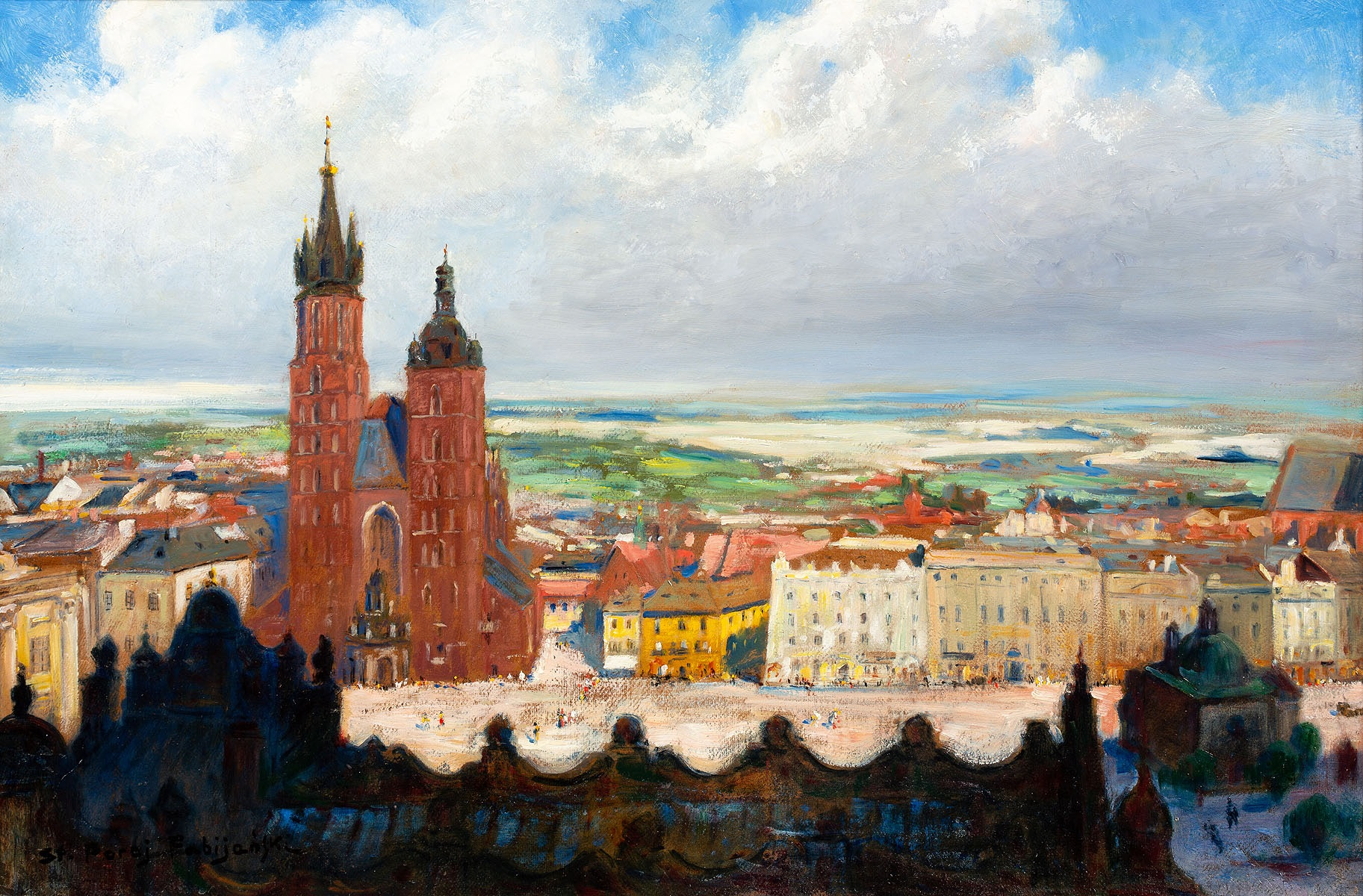
View of Kraków, with St. Mary's Basilica

Stanisław Ignacy Fabijański (22 July 1865, Paris – 13 February 1947, Kraków) was a Polish cityscape painter, illustrator, and sculptor.

== Life and work ==
He was born to the painter, Erazm Fabijański, who had left Poland following the January Uprising. In 1880, after some initial lessons from his father, he went to study with the sculptor, Leonard Marconi, in Lwów. From 1883 to 1888, he was enrolled at the Academy of Fine Arts, Kraków, where his teachers included Florian Cynk, Leopold Löffler and Jan Matejko.

After graduating, he continued his studies at the Academy of Fine Arts, Munich, until 1890. His primary instructor there was Alexander von Wagner. He was also heavily influenced by the battle painter, Józef Brandt. This was followed by study trips to Italy and France, after which he settled in Kraków, where he would remain for most of his life.

In 1893, he produced a set of illustrations for Listy z Afryki (Letters from Africa) by Henryk Sienkiewicz. He was awarded first prize in a poster designing competition, sponsored by the Society of Polish Artists, in 1902.

During World War I, he was a member of the Polish Legions, serving as a war artist. From 1918, he was a member of the artist's section at the Association of Legionnaires.

His early works were mostly sculptures; for altars, confessionals and sarcophagi. After the war, he painted cityscapes, for which he is better known. They focus on architectural features, and are mostly devoid of people. He also continued designing posters, as well as creating illustrations for magazines.
