= Lūznava =

Village in Latvia

- Village
- Location within Latvia
- Coordinates: 56°22′N 27°16′E
- Country: Latvia
- Municipality: Rēzekne municipality
- Parish: Lūznava parish

Government
  - Mayor: Vladimirs Špeļs

Population (2009)
  - Total: 434
- Time zone: UTC+2 (EET)
  - Summer (DST): UTC+3 (EEST)
- Postal code: LV-4627
- Website: www.luznava.lv

Lūznava (formerly Dlužņeva, Glužņeva) is a village located approximately 230 kilometers from Riga and is the central location of the Lūznava Parish of Rēzekne municipality in the Latgale region of Latvia.

== History ==
The first information about Lūznava village comes from the 19th century when it was called Laizāni village. At approximately 1870 brothers Pēteris and Jūlijs Dlužņevski of Polish origin became the new landowners of Laizāni village land.

At the end of 19th century once again the landowners changed and Laizāni village land became the property of General Kerbich (also of Polish origin) who laid the foundations of Lūznava village such as it actually looks today.

General Kerbetz was an engineer by education and a lover of nature, so he started two important projects in Lūznava – construction of the Lūznava Manor and the beautiful Lūznava nature park. The first phase of Lūznava Manor construction was finished shortly before the 1905 Russian revolution and it was completely finished in 1911. Although Kerbetz used the manor as a summer house but spent most of his time in Italy. To this day both the Lūznava Manor and natural park remain the main places to see in Lūznava.

== Lūznava professional technical school ==
The Lūznava professional technical school was founded in 1945 and its main purpose was to provide technical education in several mostly agriculture related spheres. It was a very important point of knowledge and education for the regeneration of region just after World War II.

== Nature ==
Lūznava park pond

=== Ūzulišku lake ===
Ūzulišku lake is a small lake located approximately 2 km from Lūznava and it is the closest swimming place.

=== Lūznava nature park ===
Lūznava nature park is a small local part of the much larger Rāzna National Park. Planting and growing the Lūznava nature park was started alongside the construction of Lūznava manor at the beginning of the 20th century. Owner of Lūznava manor General Kerbetz and his wife brought and planted many species of plants and trees that are not normally found in this area.

== Economics, manufacture and business ==
Most of the movement in Lūznava village is generated by and about the Lūznava professional technical school. There are several small enterprises manufacturing log buildings such as outdoor saunas, garden houses and similar small buildings.

== See also ==
- Lūznava Manor
