= Jan Stanisławski (painter) =

Polish painter (1860–1907)

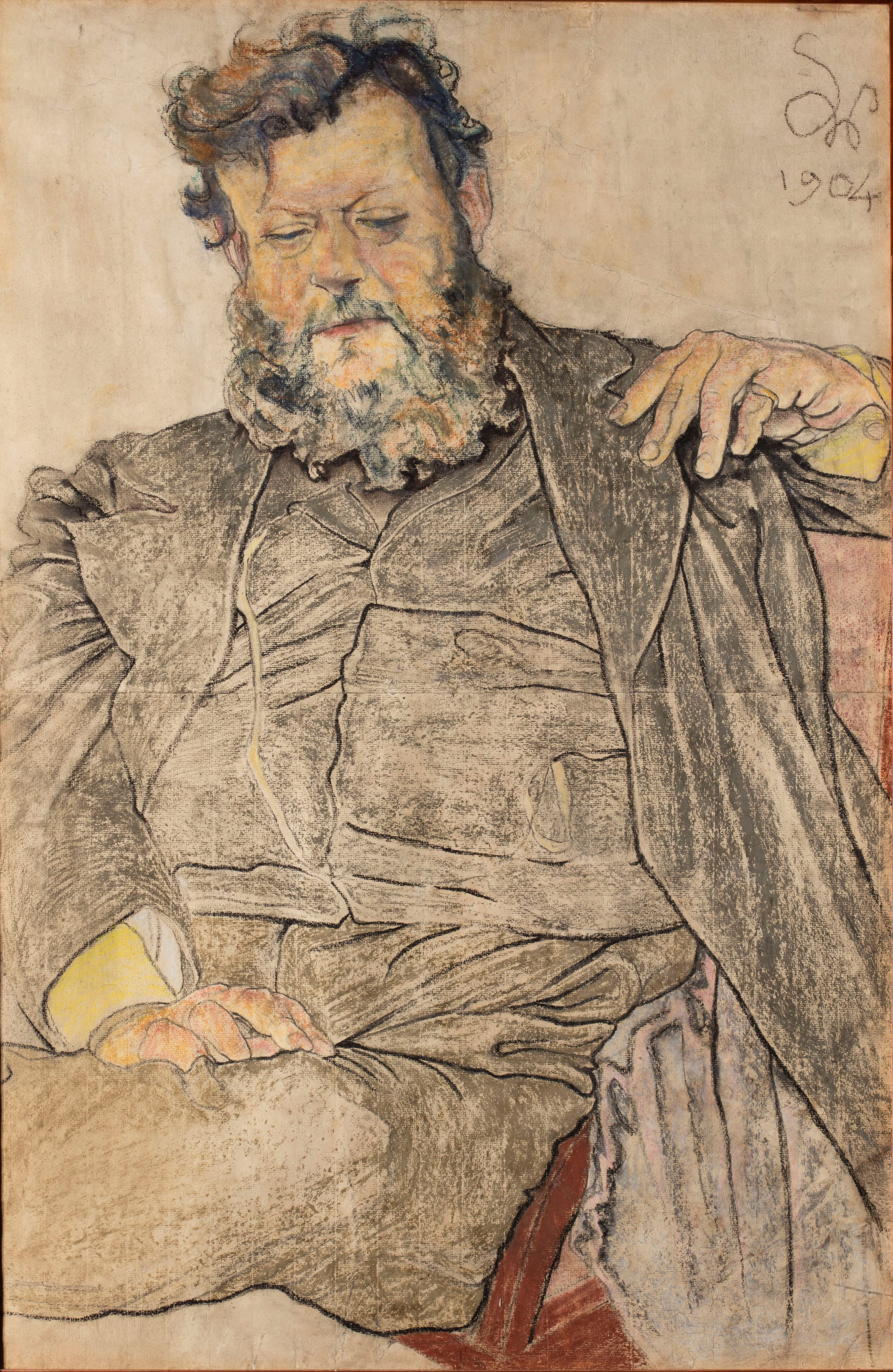
Portrait of Jan Stanisławski painted by Stanisław Wyspiański, 1904

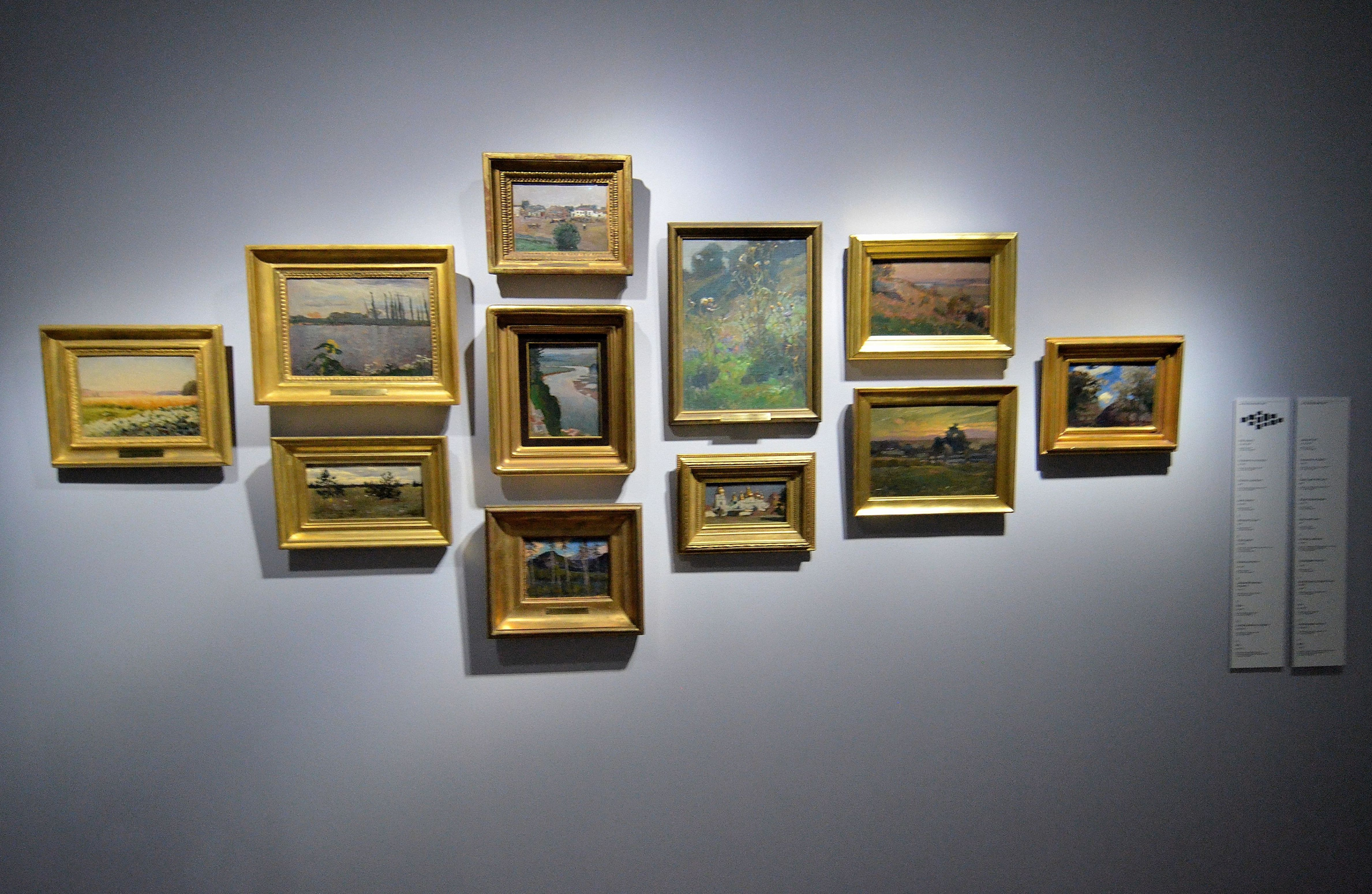
Paintings of Jan Stanisławski displayed in the National Museum in Warsaw

Jan Grzegorz Stanisławski (24 June 1860 – 6 January 1907) was a Polish modernist painter, art educator, and founder and member of various innovative art groups and literary societies. In 1906 he became a full professor at the Academy of Fine Arts in Kraków.

== Biography ==
Stanisławski was born on 24 June 1860, in Vilshana, Russian Empire. He initially studied mathematics at Warsaw University (1879–82), and subsequently at the Imperial Technical Institute in St Petersburg. He began to learn painting at the art studio in Warsaw which later gave rise to the School of Fine Arts, under Wojciech Gerson. In 1883 he enrolled in the School of Fine Arts in Kraków. In 1885, he continued his studies in Paris under Charles Emile Auguste Durand. While based in Paris, he travelled much, visiting Italy, Spain, Switzerland, Germany, Austria and eastern Galicia.

His early works were exhibited at the inauguration of the Salon du Champ-de-Mars in Paris in 1890 and at the Kraków Society of Friends of Fine Arts in 1892. In the 1890s, he travelled extensively and his sketchbooks filled up with drawings from Berlin, Dresden, Prague, Kraków, and various places in Ukraine. Together with Julian Fałat, he painted the landscape parts of Napoleon’s Army Crossing the Berezina, a panorama by Wojciech Kossak.

In 1897, he initiated and helped organise the Separate Exhibition of Painting and Sculpture at Kraków's Cloth Hall. That year, he became a teacher of landscape painting at the School of Fine Arts in Kraków, and in 1906 – after the school was upgraded to an academy in 1900 – was granted full professorship and also taught at Teodor Axentowicz’s Private School of Painting and Drawing for Women and at Teofila Certowicz’s Art School for Women in Kraków.

He co-founded the Society of Polish Artists "Sztuka" ("Art") in Kraków in 1897. Later he became Deputy Chairman and finally Chairman of that society, and showed his works at numerous exhibitions organised by it. In 1898, he became a member of the Viennese Secession, and his works were exhibited among theirs in 1901, 1902 and 1905. In 1901, he became a founding member of the Polish Applied Arts Society. He worked in the Wawel Castle Reconstruction Committee and was involved in the activities of the Green Balloon (Zielony Balonik) Cabaret.

After his death, two exhibitions were opened at the Palace of Art by the Kraków Society of Friends of Fine Arts in November 1907, one to show 154 of his oil paintings, as well as drawings and watercolours, and the other to present the works of his numerous outstanding students. Stanisławski was buried with honours at the Rakowicki Cemetery in Kraków.

Stanisławski died on 6 January 1907, in Kraków, Austria-Hungary.

== Selected paintings ==
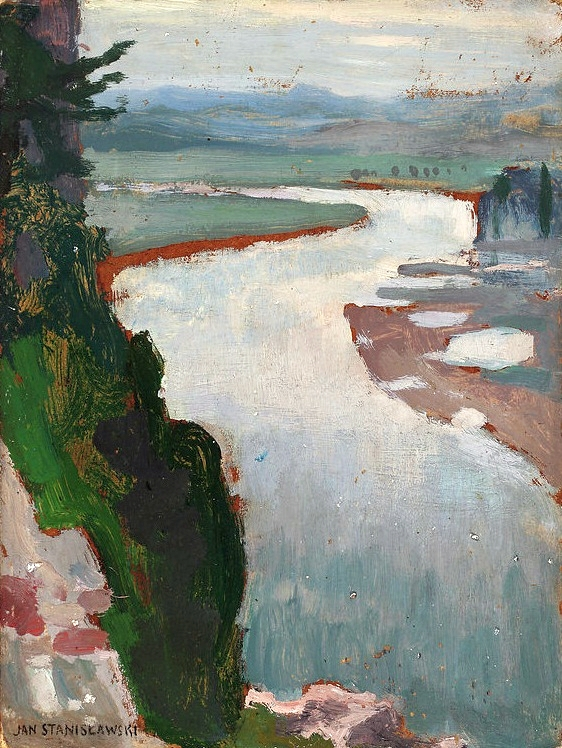
The Vistula near Tyniec, National Museum in Warsaw

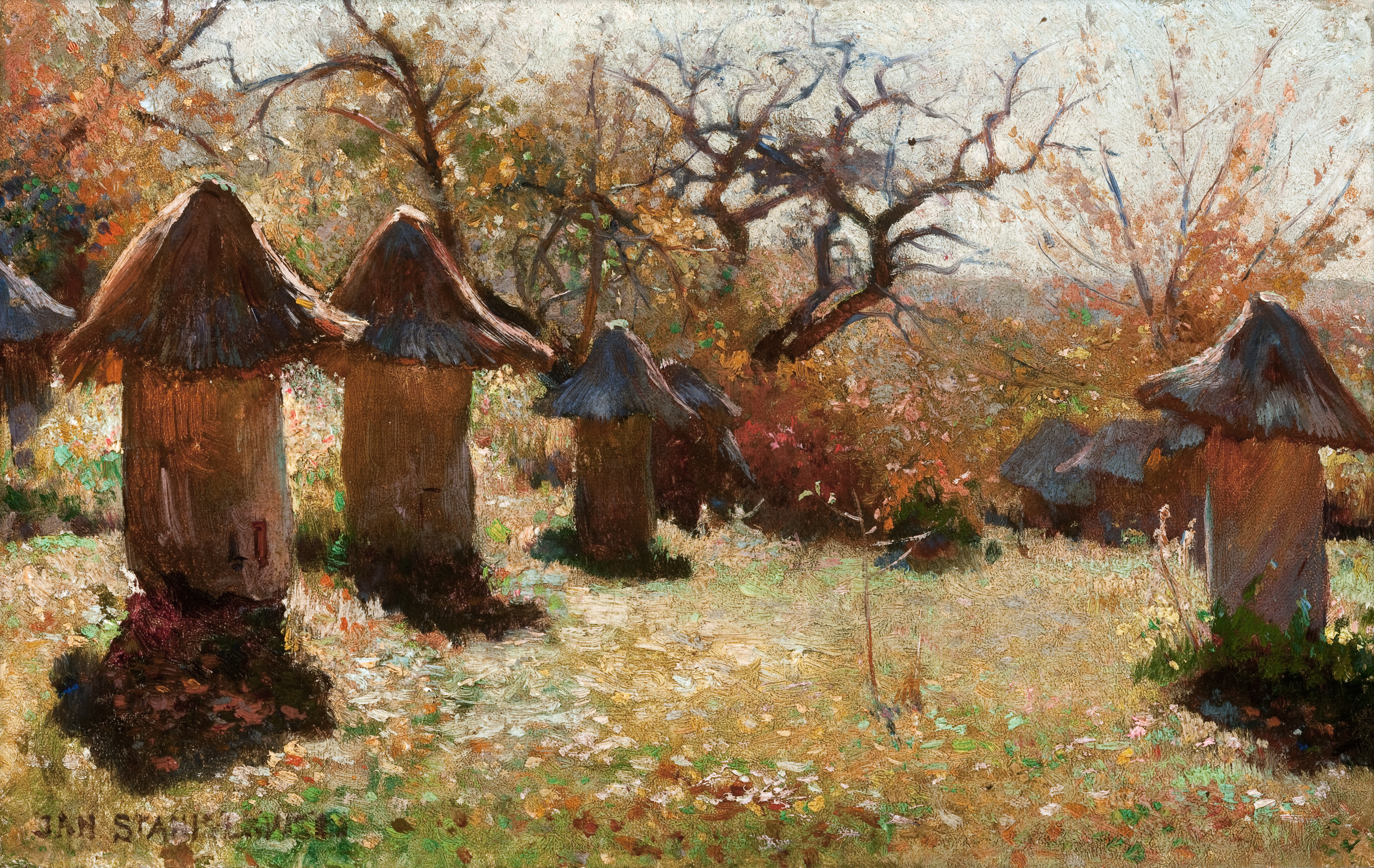
Beehives in the Ukraine, 1895, National Museum in Kraków

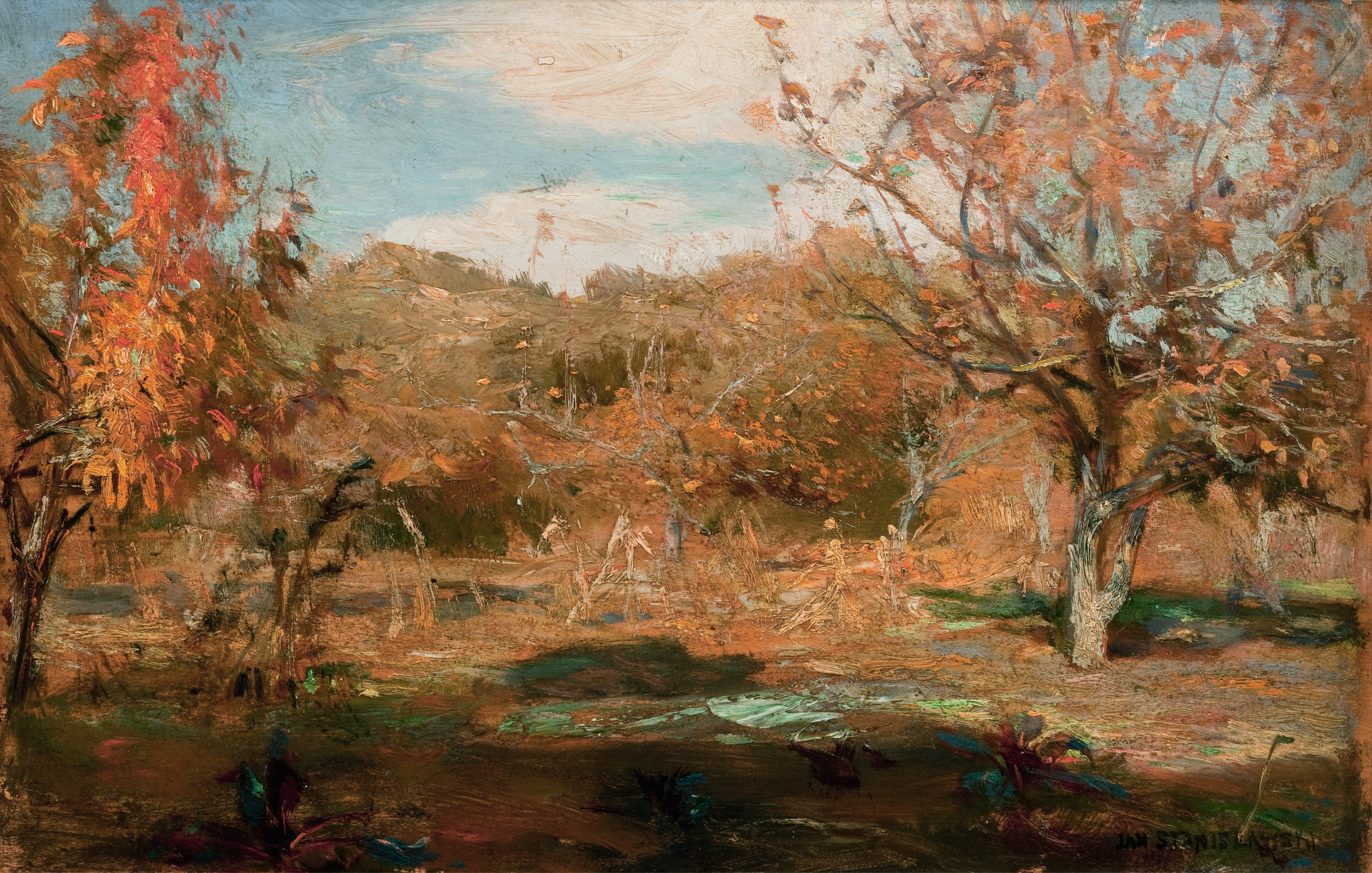
Orchard, 1899, National Museum in Kraków

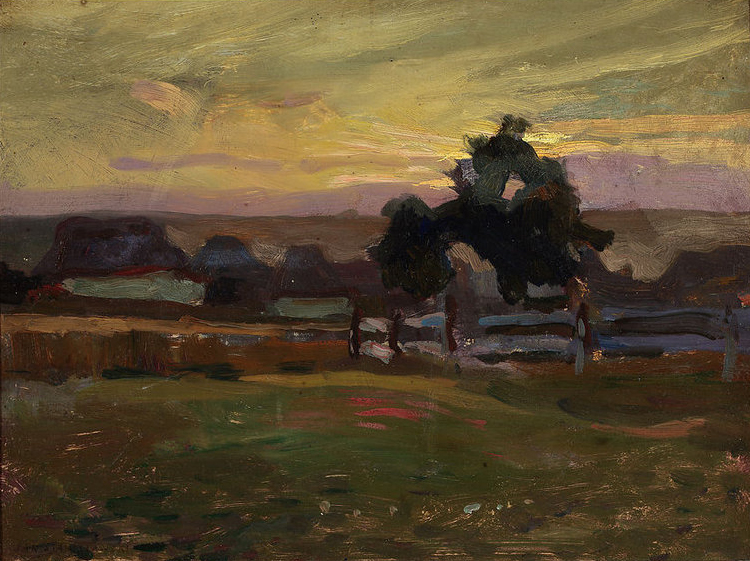
Nightfall, National Museum in Warsaw

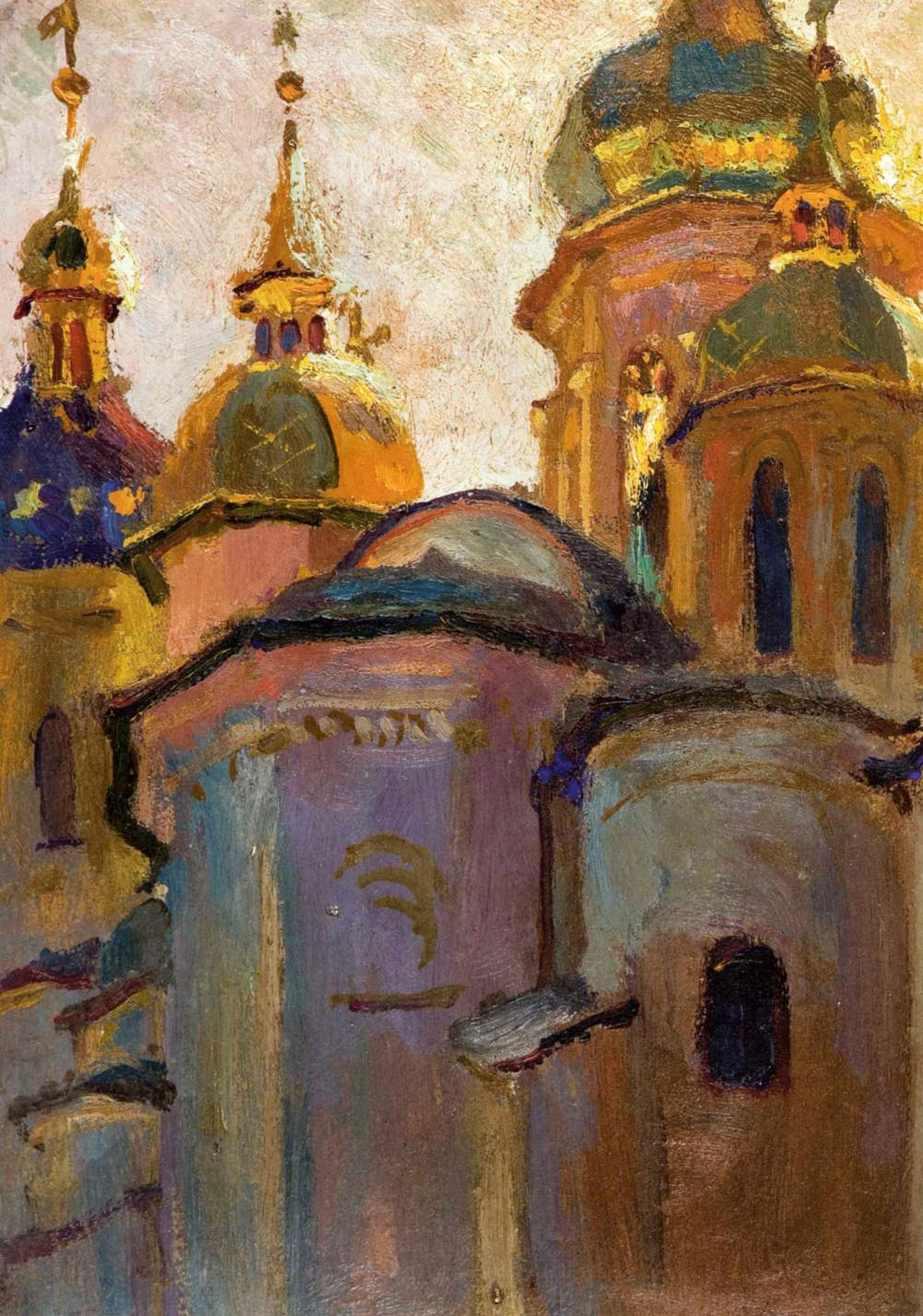
Saint Sophia Cathedral, Kyiv

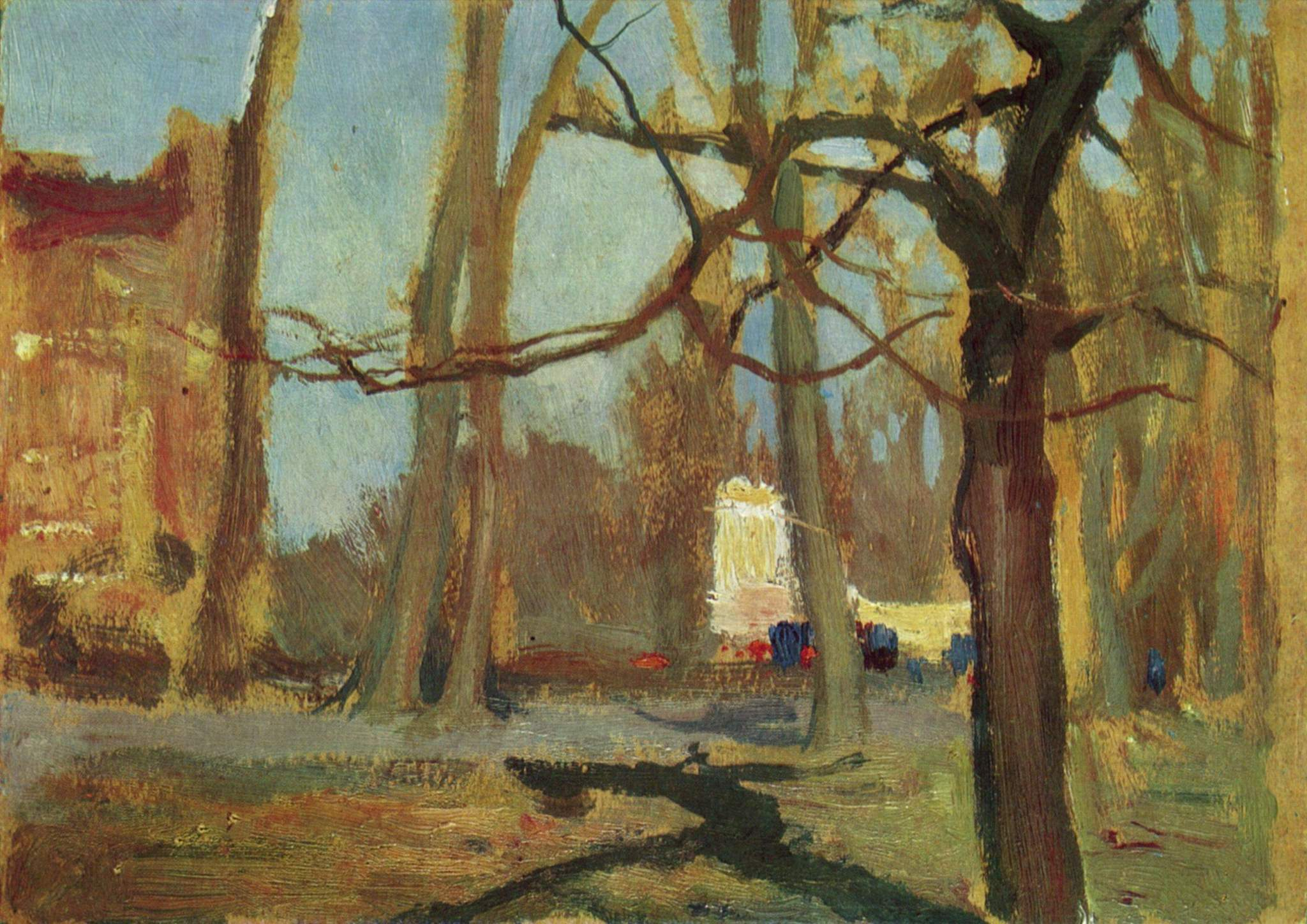
Park Planty, National Museum in Wrocław

== See also ==
- List of Poles
