= Erazm Fabijański =

Ukrainian-born Polish painter, illustrator and set designer

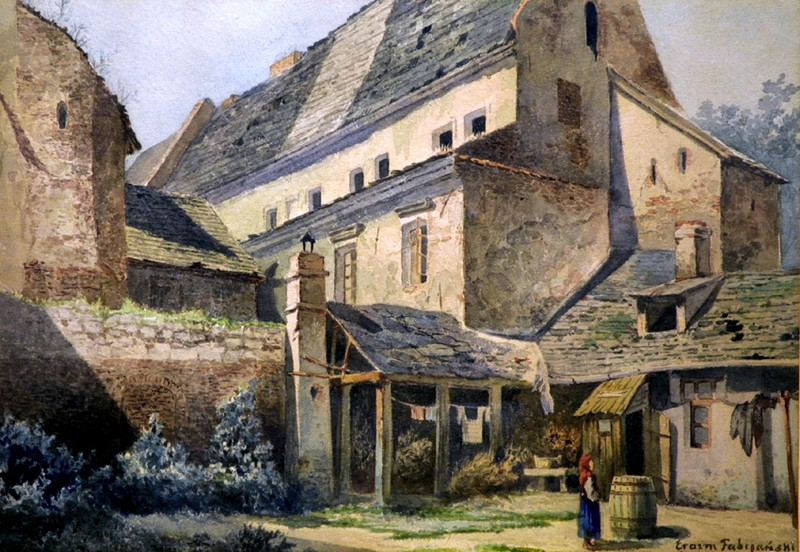
Hospital of the Holy Spirit in Kraków

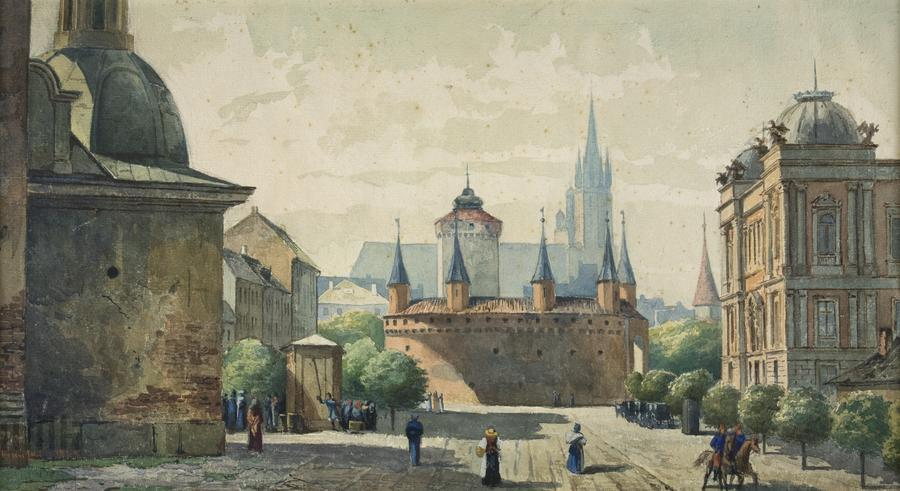
View of the Kraków Barbican

Erazm Rudolf Fabijański, also Fabjański or Fabiański (1826 — 17 July 1892) was a Polish painter, illustrator and set designer.

== Biography ==
He was born in Żytomierz. The details of his early life are unclear. He apparently began by studying medicine in Kiev, then switched to the Imperial Academy of Arts in Saint Petersburg, where he studied painting and lithography. In 1848, he was one of the artists who provided illustrations for Topographical Anatomy of the Human Body by Nikolay Pirogov.

From 1852 to 1860, he was Director of the theater in Żytomierz, where he designed sets for an early production of Halka, by Stanisław Moniuszko. In 1857, he created several lithographs of the Church of the Tithes, which appeared in the Gallery of Kiev Antiquities. During this time, he married an actress named Helena Zielinska.

In 1861 he was briefly jailed for "patriotic activities". Following his release, he moved to Warsaw, where he wrote for the Kurier Warszawski and provided illustrations for Tygodnik Illustrowany and the satirical journal Kłosy (Ears).

Two years later, he participated in the January Uprising. When it was suppressed, he went into a self-imposed exile, first in Vienna, then to France, where he may have worked as a decorator in Marseille before going to Paris. Later, he joined the French Foreign Legion and was wounded fighting in the Franco-Prussian War. After 1871, he returned to Poland and settled in Lwów, where he painted murals at St. George's Cathedral and created sets for several operas.

In 1880, he moved to Kraków, where he decorated churches and theaters; occasionally travelling to paint in other cities. Today, he is remembered largely for his numerous cityscapes and architectural paintings. His son, Stanisław, born while he was in Paris, also became a painter; best known for his cityscapes. Fabijański died in 1892 in Kraków.
