= Lūznava Manor =

Manor house in Latvia

Coordinates: 56°21′37″N 27°15′37″E

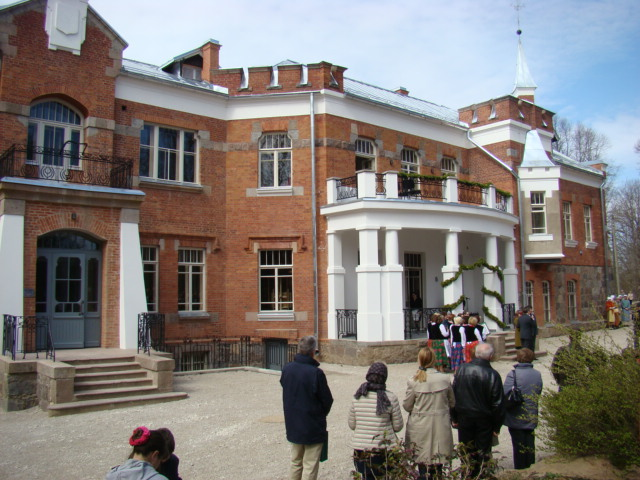
- Interactive map of the Lūznava Manor area

General information
- Architectural style: Art Nouveau
- Location: Rēzekne Municipality, Latvia
- Construction started: 1905
- Completed: 1911
- Client: Stanisław Kierbedź

Lūznava Manor (also known as: Dlužneva or Glužņeva) is a manor house located in the village of Lūznava, Rēzekne Municipality, in the Latgale region of Latvia. Today the local primary school of Lūznava is located in the manor house. There is also a 19th-century barn near the manor house.

== History ==
Lūznava Manor was built between the years 1905–1911. The owner of the manor was the Lithuanian and Polish engineer Stanisław Kierbedź and the architect is unknown, but rumours tell that it was built after Kierbedź's own project. It was built of red brick, with window openings, a cornice, and terrace columns.

In the Lūznava Manor an interesting symbiosis of Historicism and Art Nouveau can be seen. The non-homogeneous division of the façade, the varied architectonic elements such as asymmetric wings, porches, balconies and bays, generally corresponded to the principles of the Art Nouveau style, although the building was not free from the motifs of Neo-Gothic.

One of the rooms in the mansion was decorated with wall paintings in the Polish Secession style by the Polish painter Kazimierz Stabrowski. The building was erected in bricks and stone. The owner of the new manor building was Eugenia Kierbedź (1855-1946), known as big devotee of Polish modern art and patroness. So, the manor house for many summers became home for many Polish and Lithuanian painters.

== See also ==
- List of palaces and manor houses in Latvia

== Sources ==
- Zarāns, Alberts (2006). Latvijas pilis un muižas. Castles and manors of Latvia (in Latvian and English). Riga. ISBN 9984-785-05-X. OCLC 72358861.
