= Stanisław Bohusz-Siestrzeńcewicz (painter) =

Polish painter

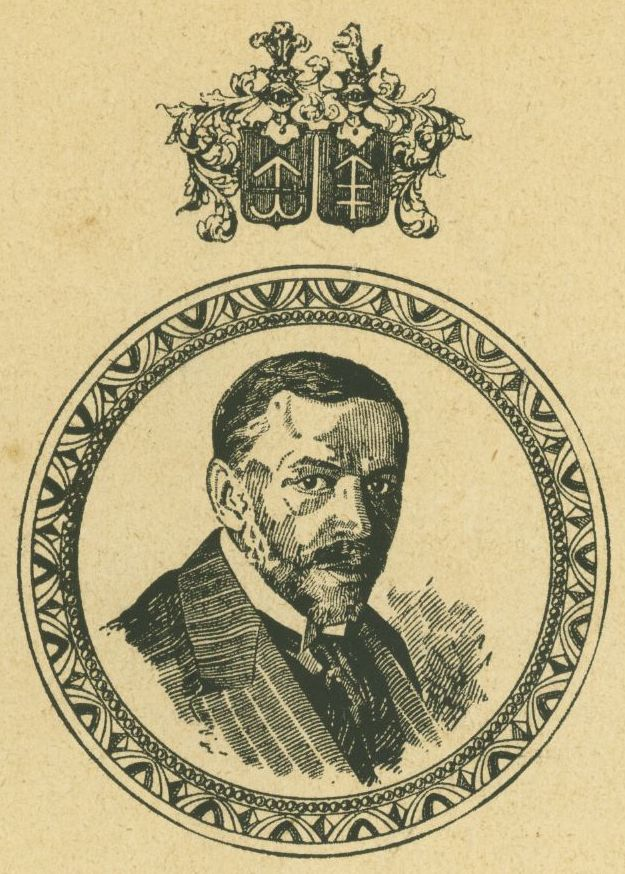
Self-portrait from his album of sketches (1912)

Stanisław Bohusz-Siestrzeńcewicz (Lithuanian: Stanislovas Bauža-Sestšencevičius; 11 November 1869 – 24 May 1927) was a Polish-Lithuanian painter and illustrator.

== Biography ==
He was born on 11 November 1869 in Vilnius to a noble family. In 1888, he began his artistic studies at the Imperial Academy of Arts in Saint Petersburg under Bogdan Willewalde. This was followed by enrollment at the Académie Julian in Paris. Later, he took private lessons from Józef Brandt at his studio in Munich and married his daughter Krystyną. They were divorced in 1905.

He specialized in genre scenes and landscapes from the villages and rural areas around Vilnius and held frequent exhibitions at the "Towarzystwo Zachęty Sztuk Pięknych" (Society for the Promotion of Fine Arts) and the salon of the noted art collector Aleksander Krywult, both in Warsaw, where he lived for several years after 1900. He also lived in Poznań.

His sketches and pen drawings were gathered together in a large album in 1912 and published by B. Wierzbicki & Co. He was also a popular portraitist and his drawings were regularly featured in the Tygodnik Illustrowany. Several works by Eliza Orzeszkowa feature his illustrations. In 1906, he created an allegory on the advancement of knowledge for the ceiling of the staircase in Warsaw's "House of Technology".

In addition to his art, he was a co-organizer and director of "Achów" (outrage); cabaret pieces that were presented during the annual Shrovetide carnival in Vilnius from 1904 to 1914. He was a lecturer at Vilnius University from 1919 to 1920.

For many years, he suffered from tuberculosis and died of that disease while seeking treatment in Warsaw.

== Selected paintings ==
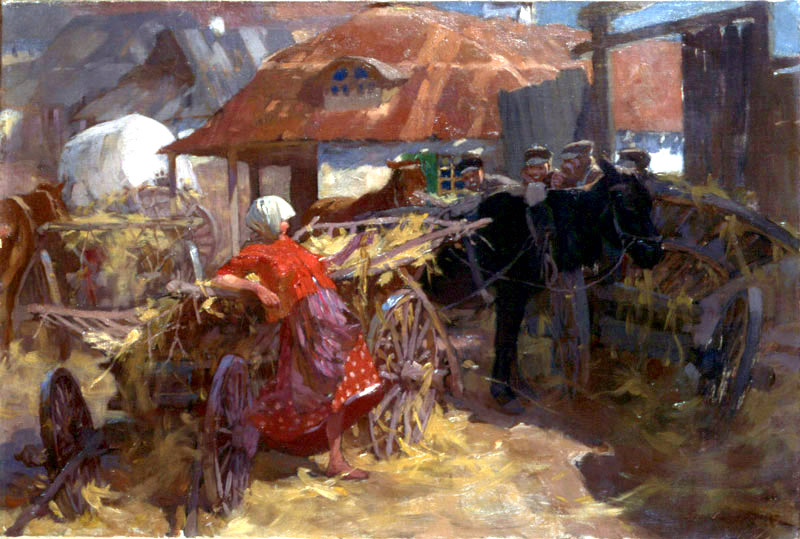
Fairground Flirt

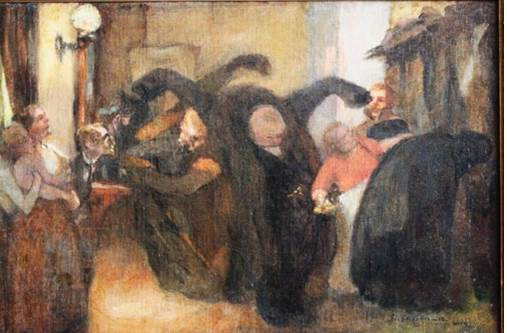
A Scene in the Hall

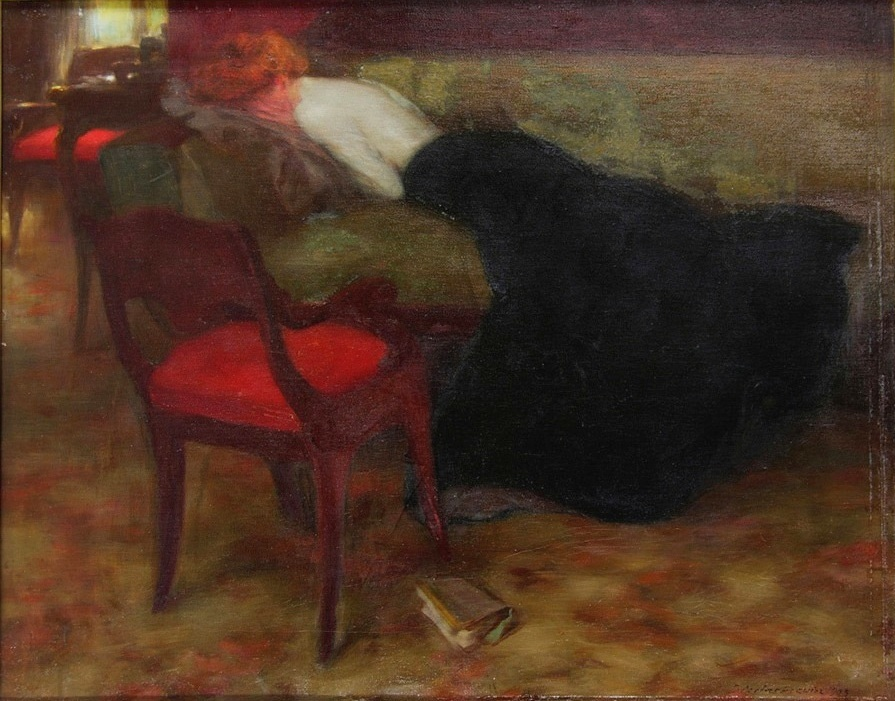
Woman Crying

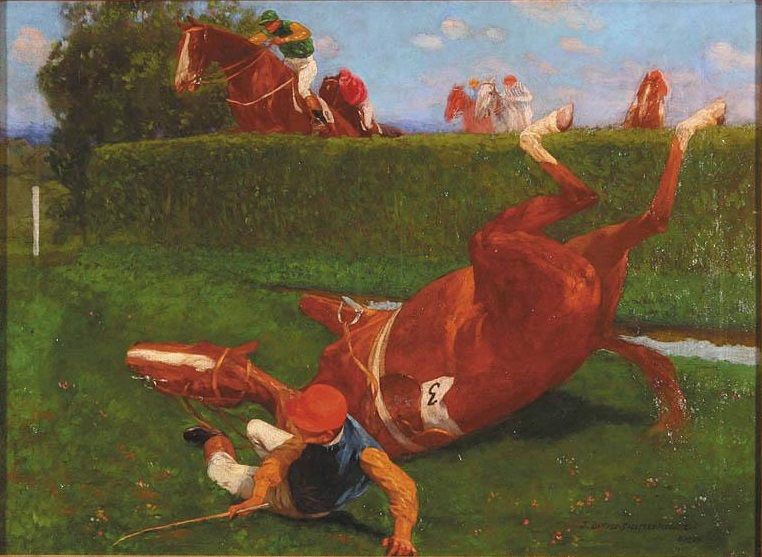
The Jockey's Fall
