= List of poster artists =

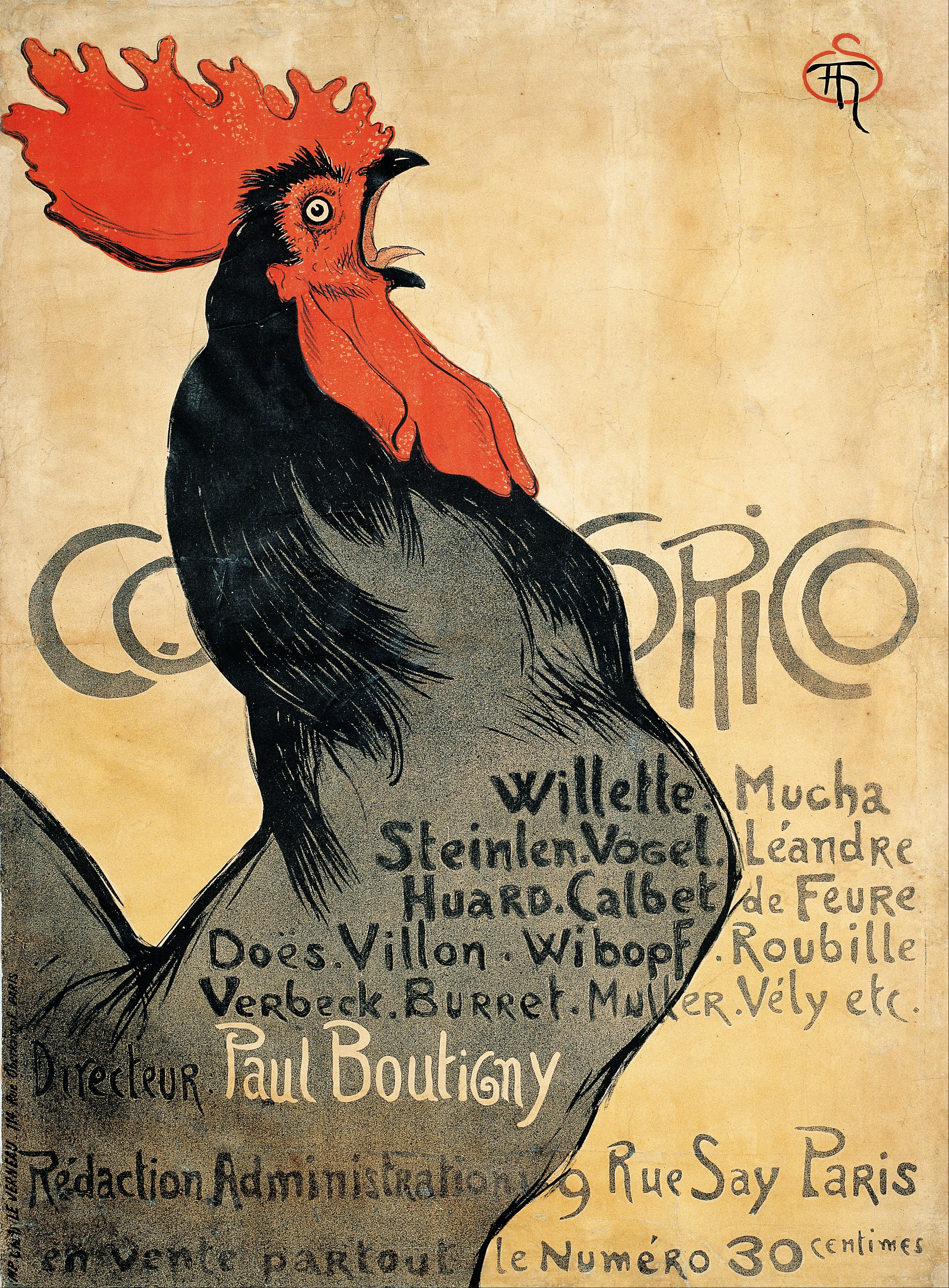
Théophile Alexandre Steinlen - Cocorico,

This is a list of poster artists.

== Historic poster artists ==
- The Beggarstaffs, active 1893–1899
- Róbert Berény (1887–1954)
- Gino Boccasile (1901–1952)
- Sándor Bortnyik (1893–1976)
- Firmin Bouisset (1859–1925)
- Leonetto Cappiello (1875–1942)
- Jean Carlu (1900–1997)
- Adolphe Mouron Cassandre (1901–1968)
- Angelo Cesselon (1922–1992)
- Jules Chéret (1836–1932)
- Paul Colin (1892–1985)
- Viktor Deni (1893–1946)
- Tom Eckersley (1914–1995)
- Hans Rudi Erdt (1883–1918)
- Jean Michel Folon (1934–2005)
- John Gilroy (1898–1985)
- Eugène Grasset (1845–1917)
- Tadeusz Gronowski (1894–1990)
- Albert Guillaume (1873–1942)
- Ludwig Hohlwein (1874–1949)
- Gustav Klutsis (1895–1938)
- Georgy Kovenchuk (1933–2015)
- Privat Livemont (1861–1936)
- Achille Mauzan (1883–1952)
- Dmitry Moor (1883–1946)
- Alfons Mucha (1860–1939)
- Frank Newbould (1887–1951)
- Raymond Savignac (1907–2002)
- Galina Shubina (1902–1980)
- Franciszek Starowieyski (1930–2009)
- Théophile Steinlen (1859–1923)
- Henryk Tomaszewski (1914–2005)
- Henri de Toulouse-Lautrec (1864–1901)
- Heinz Traimer (1921–2002)
- Boris Uspensky (1927–2005)
- Boris Yefimov (1900–2008)

== Modern poster artists ==
- Reza Abedini
- Beautiful Angle
- Michel Bouvet
- Syd Brak
- Pola Brändle
- Seymour Chwast
- Warren Dayton
- Shepard Fairey
- Jim Fitzpatrick
- Jean-Michel Folon
- André François
- Shigeo Fukuda
- Erick Ginard
- Milton Glaser
- David Lance Goines
- Rick Griffin
- Fons Hickmann
- Istvan Horkay
- Amos Paul Kennedy, Jr.
- Dóra Keresztes
- Jan Lenica
- Stanley Mouse
- Rafal Olbinski
- István Orosz
- David Plunkert
- Favianna Rodriguez
- Wiesław Rosocha
- Wiktor Sadowski
- Mehdi Saeedi
- Jan Sawka
- Scrojo
- Todd Slater
- Smear (Cristian Gheorghiu)
- Waldemar Świerzy
- Piotr Szyhalski
- David Tartakover
- Niklaus Troxler
- Jefferson Wood
- Drew Struzan
- Renato Casaro

== See also ==
- Lists of artists
