= Erick Ginard =

Cuban artist

- Born: 1979 (age 46–47); Havana, Cuba
- Education: Higher Institute of Industrial Design (ISDi)
- Known for: Posters

Erick Ginard (born September 8, 1979) is a contemporary visual artist and the most internationally awarded Cuban poster artist since the Cuban poster boom of the 1970s.

== Early life ==
Erick Ginard, the eldest child of two medical professionals, was born in Marianao, Havana, Cuba. While he spent his early years in Havana, his family later relocated to Las Tunas in eastern Cuba, after being assigned by the Cuban government to a social mission. Ginard's upbringing was divided between these two cities. Although he exhibited early talent in drawing, he prioritized sports and outdoor activities over artistic pursuits during that period.

After completing his mandatory military service at the age of 18, Ginard enrolled at the Higher Institute of Industrial Design (ISDi), with a limited understanding of the design field. Throughout his college years, he viewed himself as an underperforming student, yet he was steadfast in his decision to pursue a career outside of medicine.

As he progressed, Ginard ventured into designing and illustrating books for Cuban publishing houses while cultivating an interest in poster art.

== Career ==
After graduating in 2003, Ginard gained extensive experience in diverse areas of graphic design. In the next five years, he designed and illustrated more than a hundred books and magazines for various Cuban, Mexican, and American publishers. He designed publications such as Caminos magazine, the cultural magazine La Letra del Escriba, the Journal of the International Festival of New Latin American Cinema, and the newspaper of the Havana International Book Fair while creating his first posters.

With a strong expressionist aesthetic, Ginard's posters quickly stand out in the Cuban poster landscape with an identity of their own. The unfinished hand drawing, just like a sketch, and bold use of typography marked his early works and are often found throughout his later graphic production.

In 2008, a poster created to celebrate the ten years of "A Guitarra Limpia" at the Pablo de la Torriente Brau Cultural Center won the First Prize in the national contest organized for this purpose. Following this achievement, Ginard's poster gained increased visibility and garnered further recognition.

In 2010, Ginard settled in Mexico City where he founded his design studio together with Cuban artist Katherine R. Paz. Tojosa Design Studio became the physical and spiritual space where Ginard continually develops signature projects. In Mexico, Erick's posters are differentiated almost only by the purpose that inspires them. On the one hand, there are those created for commercial orders, on the other, those that respond to social, political, and environmental calls. This thematic bipolarity places Ginard within a select group of designers who address commercial and social themes with the same impetus and effectiveness. According to Erick Ginard, visual creation must respond to noble causes and be, regardless of the medium in which it is expressed, always honest.

Considered among the most recognized contemporary poster artists in the world, Erick Ginard's graphic work has been exhibited in more than 40 countries. Ginard’s posters are part of the permanent collections of universities and academic institutions in the United States, Japan, Spain, Mexico, and Argentina, as well as various museums and iconic cultural institutions, such as the Toyama Prefectural Museum of Art and Design in Japan and the Lahti Poster Museum in Finland.

His service as a juror at art and design events in America, Europe, and Asia is also noteworthy. In 2020, Ginard was the only representative from the Americas on the professional design jury of the Golden Turtle Festival in Moscow. In 2023, he became the first non-European member of the jury of the seventh edition of the Anfachen Award, in Hamburg.

== Selected awards and honors ==
- Grand Prix – "7th Prague Virtual Biennale", Czech Republic.
- Grand Prix – "2nd International Poster Biennale – Roma, Citizen, European", Oświęcim, Poland.
- Gold Medal – "World Biennial – Eco State Poster Competition", Montenegro.
- Gold Medal – "4th Biennial Exhibition of Contemporary International Ink Design", China.
- Gold Medal – "Bolivia Poster Biennial BICeBé '21", Bolivia.
- Gold Award – "The Golden Turtle Festival '23", Russia.
- Gold Award – "The Golden Turtle Festival '17", Russia.
- Poster Prize – "62nd San Sebastian International Film Festival", Spain.
- Silver Award – "3rd Taipei International Design Award", Taiwan.
- Silver Medal – "15th International Poster Biennial in Mexico (BICM)", Mexico.
- Silver Award – "6th Emirates International Poster Festival (EIPF)", Dubai.
- Silver Medal – "3rd Biennial Exhibition of Contemporary International Ink Design", China.
- Bronze Medal – "16th International Poster Biennial in Mexico (BICM)", Mexico.
- Stellar Award – "3rd Intercontinental Poster Competition", United States.
- Judges' Special Award – "3rd Taipei International Design Award", Taiwan.
- Honorable Mention – "7th International Biennale of Theatre Poster Rzeszów", Poland.
- Diploma of the Jury – "The 6th Moscow Poster Competition", Russia.
- Jury Special Prize – "International Poster Design Competition Against Violence Toward Women", Turkey.
- Winner Poster – "Poster for Tomorrow", France.
- Winner Poster – "Posters for the Planet", United States.
- Winner Poster – "V Anfachen Award", Germany.
- Winner Poster – "II Anfachen Award", Germany.
- Winner Poster – "1st Calanca Biennale", Switzerland.
- Winner Poster – "Poster Heroes", Italy.
- Winner Poster – "Typoday International Poster Competition", India.
- Winner Billboard – "16th Art Moves Billboard Art Festival", Poland.
- Winner Billboard – "13th Art Moves Billboard Art Festival", Poland.
- Winner Billboard – "11th Art Moves Billboard Art Festival", Poland.
- Excellence Award – "International Poster Biennale for Peace Nanjing '23", China.
- Excellence Award – "The 10th China International Poster Biennial", China.
- Award of Excellence – "17th Platinum Originality Award – China Academy of Art", China.
- Distinction – "10th Taiwan International Graphic Design Award", Taiwan.
- Distinction – "9th Taiwan International Graphic Design Award", Taiwan.
- Honorable Mention Award – "2nd We Want Jazz International Poster Competition", Poland.
- Honorable Distinction Award – "Stop Hate Poster Show", Poland.
- Honorary Distinction – "5th Museum of Typography International Poster Contest", Greece.
- Honorary Distinction – "3rd Museum of Typography International Poster Contest", Greece.
- 2nd Prize – "Picasso's Guernica 80 Years Poster Competition", Cuba.
- 1st Prize – "19th International Book Fair Poster Competition", Cuba.
- 1st Prize – "UNESCO Program Visual Identity Award", Cuba.
- 1st Prize – "1st A Guitarra Limpia Poster Award", Cuba.
