= Angelo Cesselon =

Italian painter

- Born: February 17, 1922; Cinto Caomaggiore, Veneto, Italy
- Died: September 26, 1992 (aged 70); Velletri, Lazio
- Education: Atelier Method
- Known for: Poster-Painting for Cinema, oil painting.
- Movement: Pop art

Angelo Cesselon (February 17, 1922 – September 26, 1992) was an Italian poster painter.

== Biography ==
Cesselon began painting at a young age, following the Venetian traditions of painting from the late 19th Century, albeit with some important modifications. After he and his family moved to Rome, Cesselon found an interest in contemporary art, attending the many art and graphic studios of the city.

=== Designer for film posters ===
After the end of Second World War, Cesselon began his work for many cinema studios, in all steps of their design, from the initial drafts for film posters, also introducing, since 1947 his own interpretation of the "spirit of film", that privileged the depiction of only one big image, very often a portrait, instead of the usual proceeding in those years, that was to put a collection of many small images that made a brief storyboard of the film.

His very appreciated work, based upon his skills as a painter of portraits, but also because of his natural good taste and ability to catch an "identifying" and "definitive" image from the many sequences in a film, made him one of the most productive poster artists in the world. This activity as portraitist, that lasted until 1975, put him in direct contact with many of the most famous actors (like María Félix, Ava Gardner, Gina Lollobrigida, Marilyn Monroe, Vittorio Gassman, Totò) and film-directors of those years, and established a long collaboration with several between the most important cinematographic studios, in Europe and America.

In 1955 Angelo Cesselon received the Italian prize Spiga Cambellotti as the best cinematographic painter of the year.

=== His graphic artworks ===
Angelo Cesselon was also a graphic, and he created illustrations for covers of books, magazines and long-play albums; of particular relevance for collectors is the World athlete's portrait series, all printed in color that were published in many covers of the Italian magazine Sport nel Mondo.

Around the same periods he painted a series of covers for the magazine of Arma dei Carabinieri (Italian gendarmerie and military police), which usually collect and exhibit this works (usually a combination of imagine-poetry and military attitude) in their offices and bases.

=== Angelo Cesselon's paintings ===
Angelo Cesselon was specially known for his skill and taste in the design of graphics, in illustrations for magazines and newspapers, and in posters for cinema, but we cannot forget his activity as a painter, specially of portraits.

After the winning of an international prize in 1958, his work as a portrait painter was internationally recognized, and he was called to do portraits of many famous and important personalities, including Italian President Giovanni Gronchi, Pope John XXIII and Pope John Paul II.

In 1975, Angelo Cesselon moved to Velletri, a town in the nearby southern hills of Rome, near Castel Gandolfo in the Castelli Romani, and continued to paint fewer works in a more relaxed mode. The last part of his life consist specially of many big portraits of saints and founders of many religious institutes, which are still exposed in churches, convents and general-houses of these institutes.

Specially praised among these paintings are those of Saints Francis of Assisi, Francis of Paola, Maximilian Kolbe, Annibale Maria di Francia, and Blessed Don Alberione.

== Cesselon Archives ==
During his life, the painter produced a vast amount of drafts, sketches, drawings, posters and complete and unfinished paintings, which in a good part are included in the "Archivio Cesselon", and are now administered directly by Cesselon's heirs.

== Bibliography ==
in English:

- S.Branaghan, S.Chibnall, British Film Posters: An Illustrated History. London, BFI, 2006. (cit. pp. 184–185 and p. 301)
- Design and Applied Arts Index, Design Documentation, 1988. (cit p. 220)
- D.Kehr, Italian Film Posters. New York, Museum of Modern Art, 2003. (cit. p. 12 and p. 150)
- G.Smith, B.Carteron, J.L.Halperin, Heritage Vintage Movie Poster Auction # 640, Dallas, Heritage Capitali Corporation, s.d. (cit. p. 181)
- P.Veysey, Motor Movies: the Posters! . The Posters!, London, Veloce Publishing Ltd, 2007. (cit. p. 61 and p. 223)

in Italian:

- A.Audisio, A.Natta Soleri, La cordata delle immagini: la montagna, l'alpinismo e l'esplorazione nei manifesti del cinema: collezioni del Museo nazionale della montagna di Torino. Torino, Museo nazionale della montagna "Duca degli Abruzzi”, 1995. (cit. p. 36)
- A.Castagna, Manifesti del cinema. Federico Motta edizioni, Milano, 2004.
- Autori vari, Catalogo Bolaffi del manifesto italiano: dizionario degli illustratori. Ed.G. Bolaffi, Torino, 1995.
- M.Dell’Anno, M.Soccio, Cinema di carta: cinquant’anni di manifesti cinematografici. Bastogi, Foggia, 1984.
- M.Gallo, I manifesti nella storia e nel costume, analisi critica di Carlo Arturo Quintavalle. Mondadori, Milano, 1989.
- L.Menegazzi, Il manifesto italiano. Electa, Milano, 1995.
- L.Miccichè, Storia del cinema italiano. Scuola Nazionale di Cinema, Roma, Edizioni Bianco & Nero, 2001. (cit. p. 437 e p. 719)
- A.Olivieri, L'imperatore in platea: i grandi del cinema italiano dal Marc'Aurelio allo schermo. Bari, Edizioni Dedalo, 1986. (cit. p. 92)
- P.Sparti (a cura di), L’Italia che cambia attraverso i manifesti della raccolta Salce. Testi di Alberto Abruzzese, Artificio, Firenze, 1989.
- P.Zanotto, Veneto in film: il censimento del cinema ambientato nel territorio. 1895-2002. Giunta regionale. Assessorato alle politiche per la cultura e l'identità veneta, Venezia, Marsilio, 2002. (cit. p. 271).

== See also ==
- Cinecittà (Former fascist film-studios in Rome)
