= Charles Gesmar =

French costume and poster designer (1900–1928)

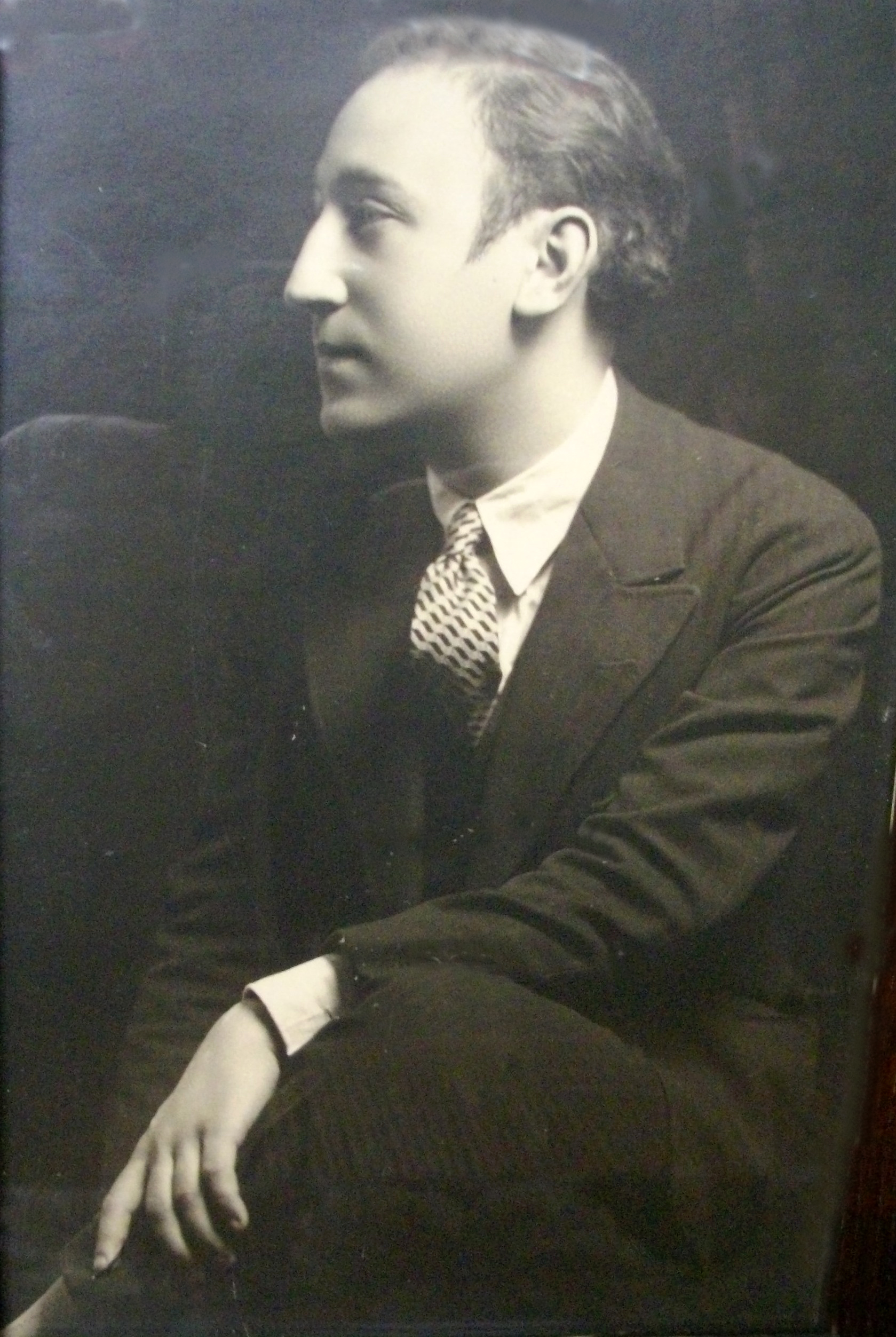
Charles Gesmar (date unknown)

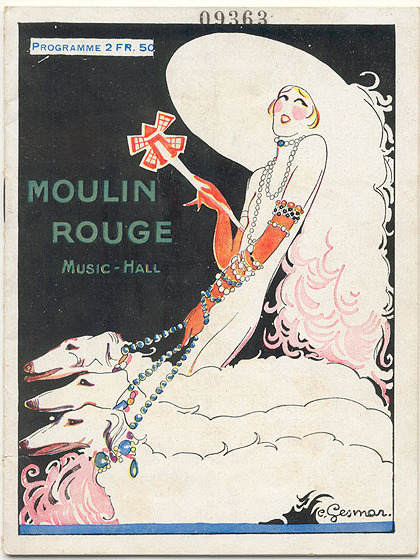
1925 Moulin Rouge programme

Charles Gesmar (born Charles Geismar, 21 May 1900 – 27 February 1928) was a French costume and poster designer. Although he died aged 27, he was very prolific.

Charles Geismar was born on 21 May 1900 in Nancy, France, the son of a Jewish family. He trained in drawing at the School of Applied Arts of Auguste Vallin.

He died from pneumonia in 1928.
