= Poster artist =

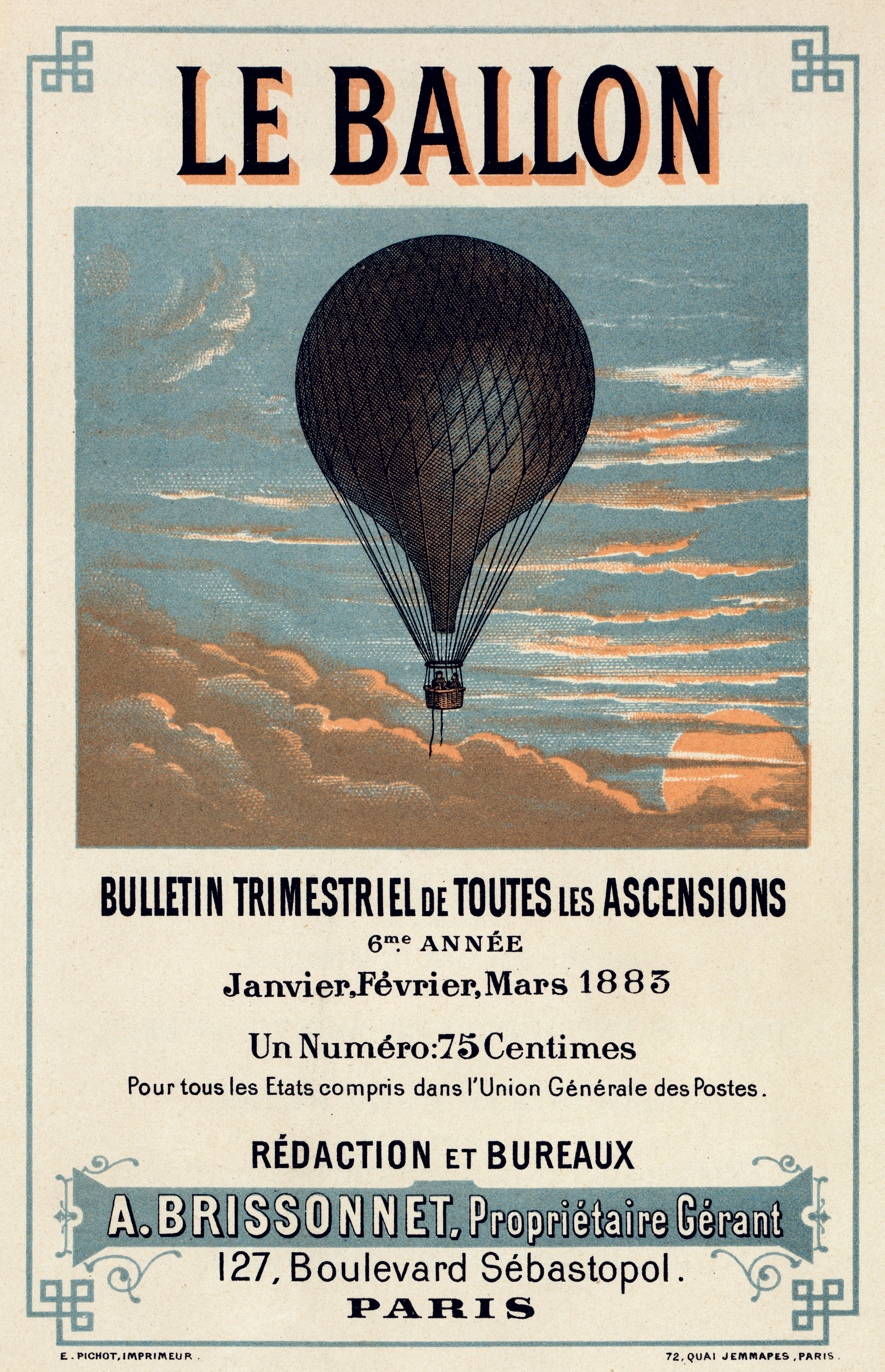
One of the first French posters for display on walls in large towns, c. 1883

A poster artist (French: Affichiste), or poster designer, a graphic designer of posters.

== Etymology ==
The name affichiste first appeared around 1780, but with a different meaning. It meant one involved in a poster's production and distribution, not its design: in particular, for producing handbills, setting up type and coordinating flyposting on walls, giving news on local and national events on a range of subjects. Usually anonymous, these people are rarely considered artists, nor their products works of art.

== Nineteenth century ==
At the end of the nineteenth century, poster art became a respectable art form, with the invention of large-scale colour lithography. (Chromolithography made its début around 1870.) Artists such as Jules Chéret, the brothers Léon and Alfred Choubrac, and Alfons Mucha became famous within the art world, working almost exclusively on advertisements. Almost simultaneously, all Western countries had their own nascent movements: in Britain, the Arts and Crafts movement, and then the Glasgow School of Art (built by Charles Rennie Mackintosh), and in Chicago, where artist William H. Bradley had worked for an advertising agency.

In France, several famous painters such as Henri de Toulouse-Lautrec also worked on poster advertising for products or entertainments. Many illustrators also worked in advertising in addition to their work for illustrated newspapers.

== Twentieth century ==
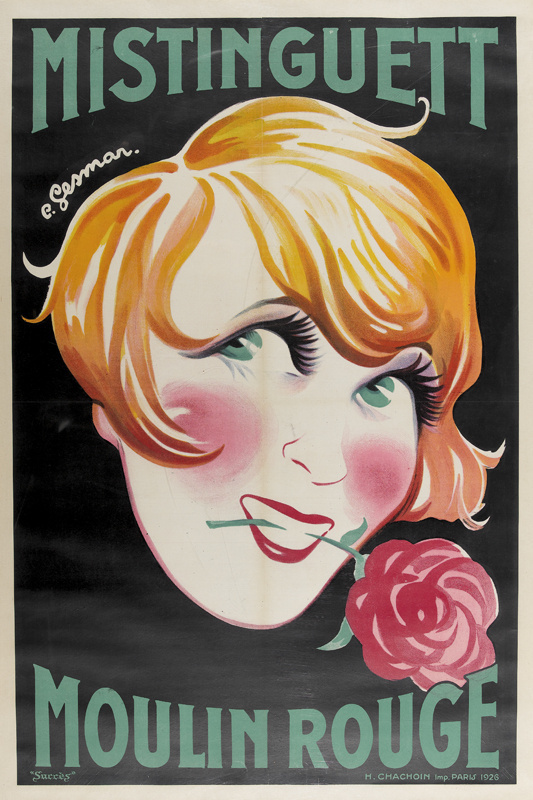

Around 1900, posters in the Art Nouveau style started to appear, notably those by Leonetto Cappiello. The first dedicated street furniture for displaying posters appeared: in particular, the advertising column or "Morris column" (French: colonne Morris), together with large billboards, murals on buildings, and so on.

Little by little, these new media were considered to be within the realm of the artist and the designer, leading to the notion of the graphic designer as a creator of images and new forms, with a greater understanding of the possibilities of the new graphic forms and the possibilities that the poster gave for expression. It was rare at this time for someone to be known as an affichiste or "poster designer" specifically. The names are still unknown of some prolific poster designers working in the 1910s in Anglophone countries.

Art Déco and more generally Modern Art, let many poster designers come to greater attention and to express their talents in this medium.

Charles Gesmar, a protégé of Mistinguett since 1916, raised posters to high art, and his posters became enormously famous afterwards.

In the 1920s, poster art became a cornerstone of graphic art, with works by artists such as Paul Iribe and Cassandre, who established Raymond Savignac. Around this time, photomontage also came to the fore, allowing poster artists to combine photography and typography.

In the 1950s, techniques of xerography led to a new school of art which came to influence pop art.

In the 1950s, the Polish artist Roman Cieslewicz brought an important school of affichiste to the fore, mostly on films, theatre works, and propaganda for the Polish Communist Party) with a nihilism bent, in the context of state censorship. Artists Raymond Hains and Jacques Villeglé, meanwhile, took the name of affichistes for their photomontage work with collages of torn-up poster fragments. An exhibit of their works in 1957 termed their works Affiches Lacérées ("Torn Posters").

In the last three decades of the twentieth century, techniques of offset printing and digital image processing became more widely used, but these new methods and media led to a great deal of innovation in poster design with new modes of expression.

== See also ==
- List of poster artists

== References and sources ==
Sources

- Jury, David (2012). Graphic Design before Graphic Designers. London: Thames and Hudson. pp. 202–. ISBN 978-0500516461.
- Rothenstein, Julian, ed. (2003). ABZ (in French). Autrement. ISBN 978-2746702974.
- Weill, Alain (1984). L'Affiche dans le monde (in French). Somogy. ISBN 978-2850561757.
