= Beautiful Angle =

Poster project in Tacoma, Washington, U.S.

Beautiful Angle is a guerrilla arts poster project in Tacoma, Washington. Approximately once per month, graphic designer Lance Kagey and writer Tom Llewellyn create hand-crafted, letterpress posters and then distribute them in and around the city's downtown core via wheat paste and staples.

== History ==
In the summer of 1999, graphic designer Lance Kagey was introduced to the art of letterpress printing through a visit to a British Columbia studio and through a program at Seattle's School of Visual Concepts. Kagey purchased a circa-1950s Challenge proof press through eBay for $50. After paying more than 12 times that amount in shipping and after months of self-education and experimentation, Kagey and copywriter and author Tom Llewellyn began producing posters.

The first poster, Swirl, was distributed on October 31, 2002, the anniversary of the posting of The Ninety-Five Theses by Martin Luther. Beautiful Angle has used a variety of printing techniques, including split fountain color process, a two-color double run, and a brayer over a printed image. A typical press run is 100 posters, of which 80 are posted around the downtown area of Tacoma, and the remainder are sold. Beautiful Angle has a "strange, contradictory relationship with the city"; even though the posters are posted perhaps illegally, the group has won a Chamber of Commerce award of merit. Beautiful Angle has also worked with other artists such as Art Chantry.

Beautiful Angle has been featured in Felt and Wire, a leading graphic design blog. It has been the subject of a City Arts Magazine cover story, as well as feature stories in the leading Tacoma newspaper, The News Tribune, and in the Weekly Volcano, Toby Room, and many local and arts-related blogs. The City of Tacoma's outreach website, cityofdestiny.com, now links to the project. Gallery shows have been held at Handforth Gallery, School of Visual Concepts, Jazzbones, Pike Street Press, Fulcrum Gallery and Blackwater Cafe. A nearly complete collection of posters is always on display at King's Books in Tacoma.

In 2006, the Washington State Historical Society awarded a grant to Beautiful Angle for a series of posters for their "History in the Making" exhibit.

In 2008, the Washington State Historical Society commissioned Beautiful Angle to make a series of posters to promote their exhibit Tacoma's Civil Rights Struggle.

In August 2009, a Beautiful Angle retrospective was included in the annual TypeCon exhibition, under the direction of the Society of Typographic Aficionados, shown in Seattle, Washington, and Brighton, England. In November 2009, the City of Tacoma Arts Commission awarded Beautiful Angle their Amocat Award.

In 2011, Beautiful Angle received a City of Tacoma arts grant to produce The Tacoma Folio, a limited-edition 30-page book of posters, each around the theme of Tacoma's own mythology.

In 2014, Beautiful Angle received a second City of Tacoma arts grant to produce a limited-edition poster for "Art at Work Month".

In 2014, Beautiful Angle was featured in a print arts show Ink This, at the Tacoma Art Museum.
