= Léon Choubrac =

French Illustrator

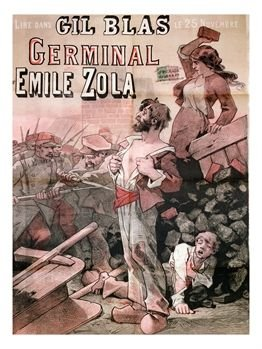
- Poster by Léon Choubrac advertising the publication of 'Germinal' by Emile Zola (1840-1902) in Gil Blas, 25 November 1878
- Born: 17 November 1847; Paris, France
- Died: 5 April 1885 (aged 37); Paris, France
- Occupations: Painter, illustrator, draughtsman and poster artist

Léon Choubrac (17 November 1847 – 5 April 1885), who sometimes signed his drawings with Hope, was a French poster designer and illustrator based in Paris.

With his younger brother Alfred Choubrac, Léon was trained as a classical artist with the painters Charles Doërr and Isidore Pils at the École des Beaux Arts. The Choubrac brothers came very soon to the poster, practicing since 1875 the modern treatment of colors and typography, associated with images thanks to chromolithography.

In the early 1870s, the Choubrac brothers and Jules Chéret (known as "the father of the modern poster") reduced the cost of colour lithography introducing technical advances. Additionally, in 1881 restrictions on bill-posting (affichage) were lifted and eased state control of the media in France. In 1884, the Paris city council started to rent out surfaces belonging to the municipality, paving the way for a rapid increase in the production and distribution of advertising posters. Posters with clear colours and dashing images appeared all over town during the vibrant spirit of the Belle Époque.

Léon Choubrac drew some posters that higher authorities seized or torn down, amongst others one that showed a woman tortured in the presence of the Pope, advertising a book by Léo Taxil and Karl Milo, Les Maîtresses du Pape (The Pope's Mistresses) (1884). Another poster, The secret loves of Pius IX, showed the portrait of Pope Pius IX below a series of portraits with heads of young women. The censor made him add a beard to the head of the Pope to disguise it. The poster nevertheless caused a scandal and was torn down by order of the French Minister of the Interior François Allain-Targé.

Léon and Alfred created the Ateliers Choubrac. As an illustrator, he sometimes collaborated with his brother in Gil Blas or the satirical weekly Le Courrier français, among others. Choubrac illustrated several works by Emile Zola. Although Leon died young at the age of 37 in 1885, his brother Alfred went on to produce an impressive number of posters for Parisian entertainers, theatres, businesses and various commercial products.

The poster collector Ernest Maindron, who wrote the first essay about the illustrated poster in the Gazette des Beaux-Arts in 1884, and later published the first book on the subject (Les Affiches Illustrees) in 1886, mentioned the Choubrac brothers, along with and Chéret, among the pioneers of the illustrated poster.

== Selected works ==
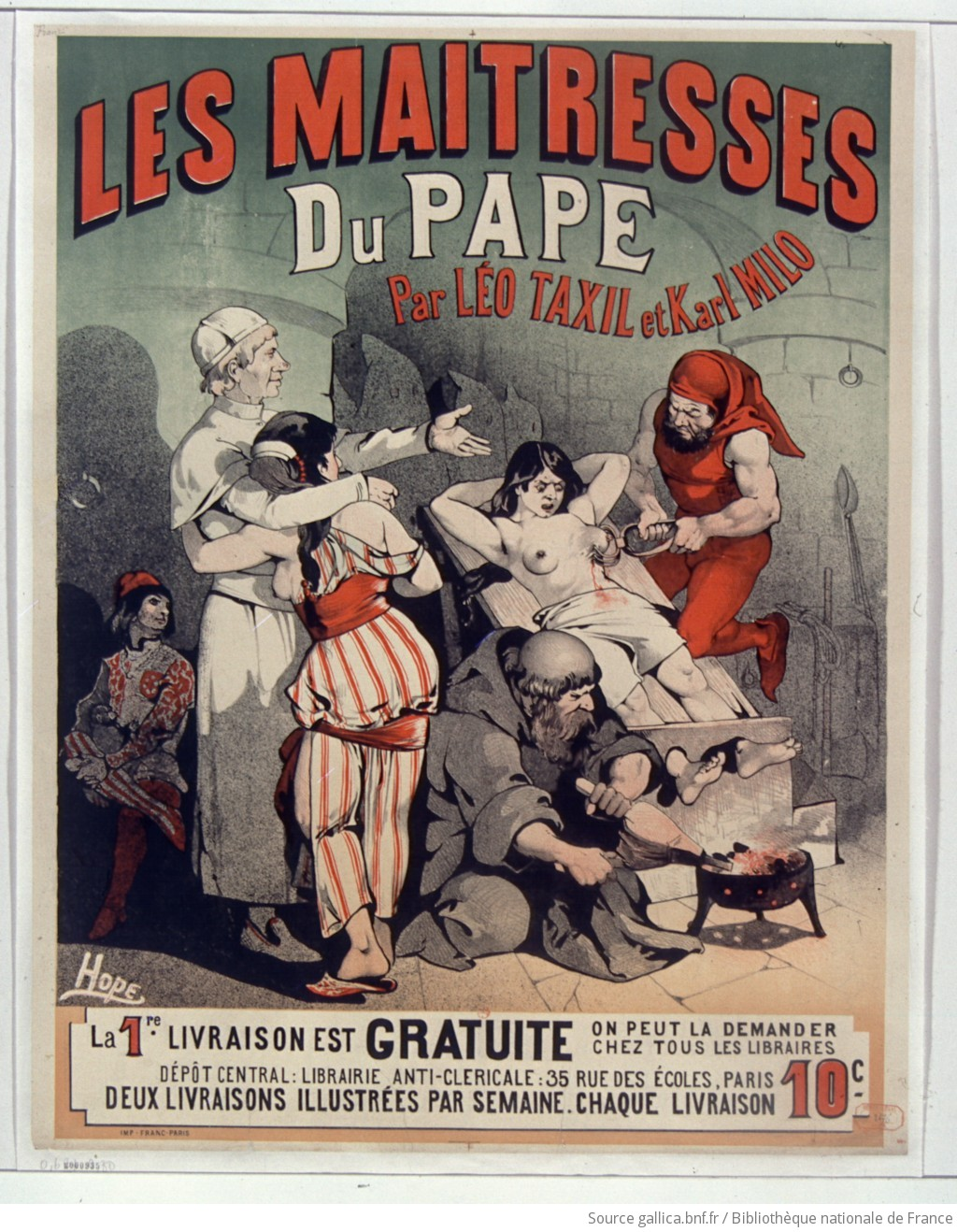
Woman tortured in the presence of the Pope, advertising a book by Léo Taxil and Karl Milo, Les Maîtresses du Pape (The Pope's Mistresses) (1884)

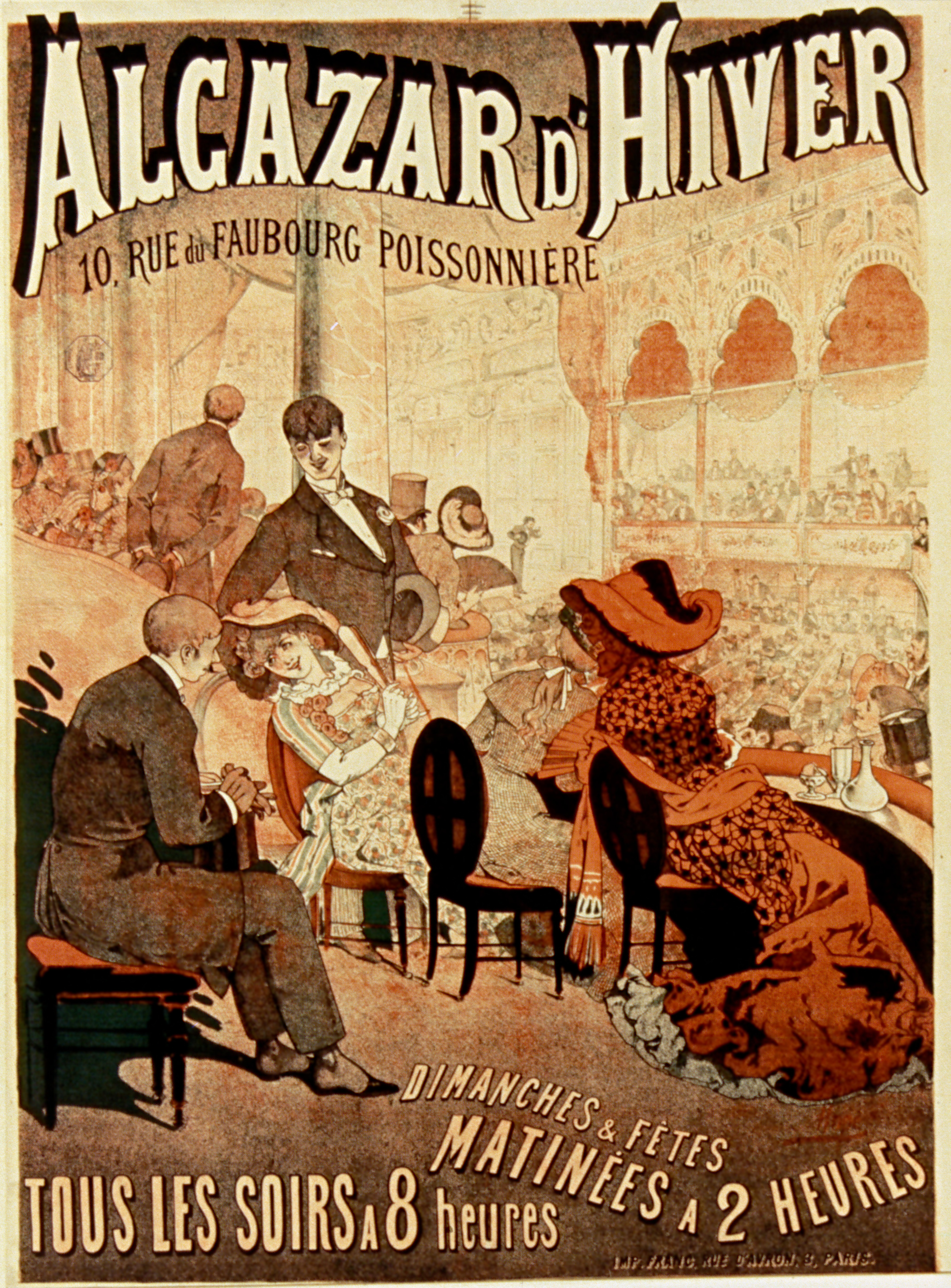
Poster for Alcazar d'Hiver (1882)

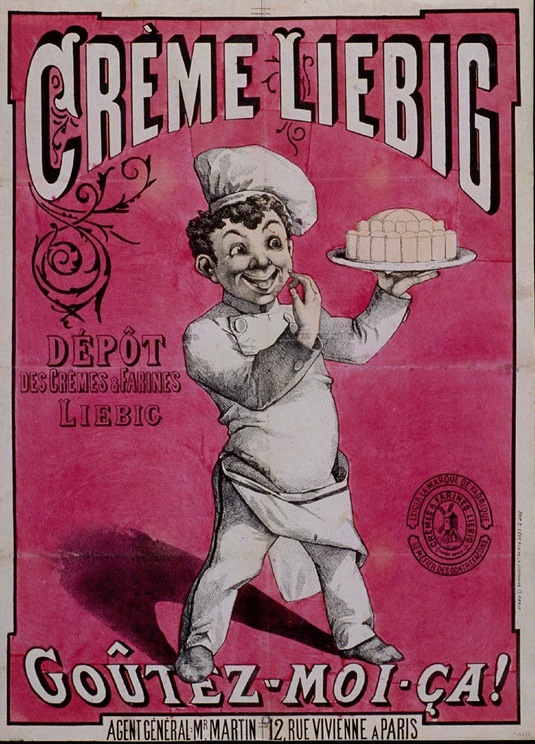
Advertising poster of Crème Liebig

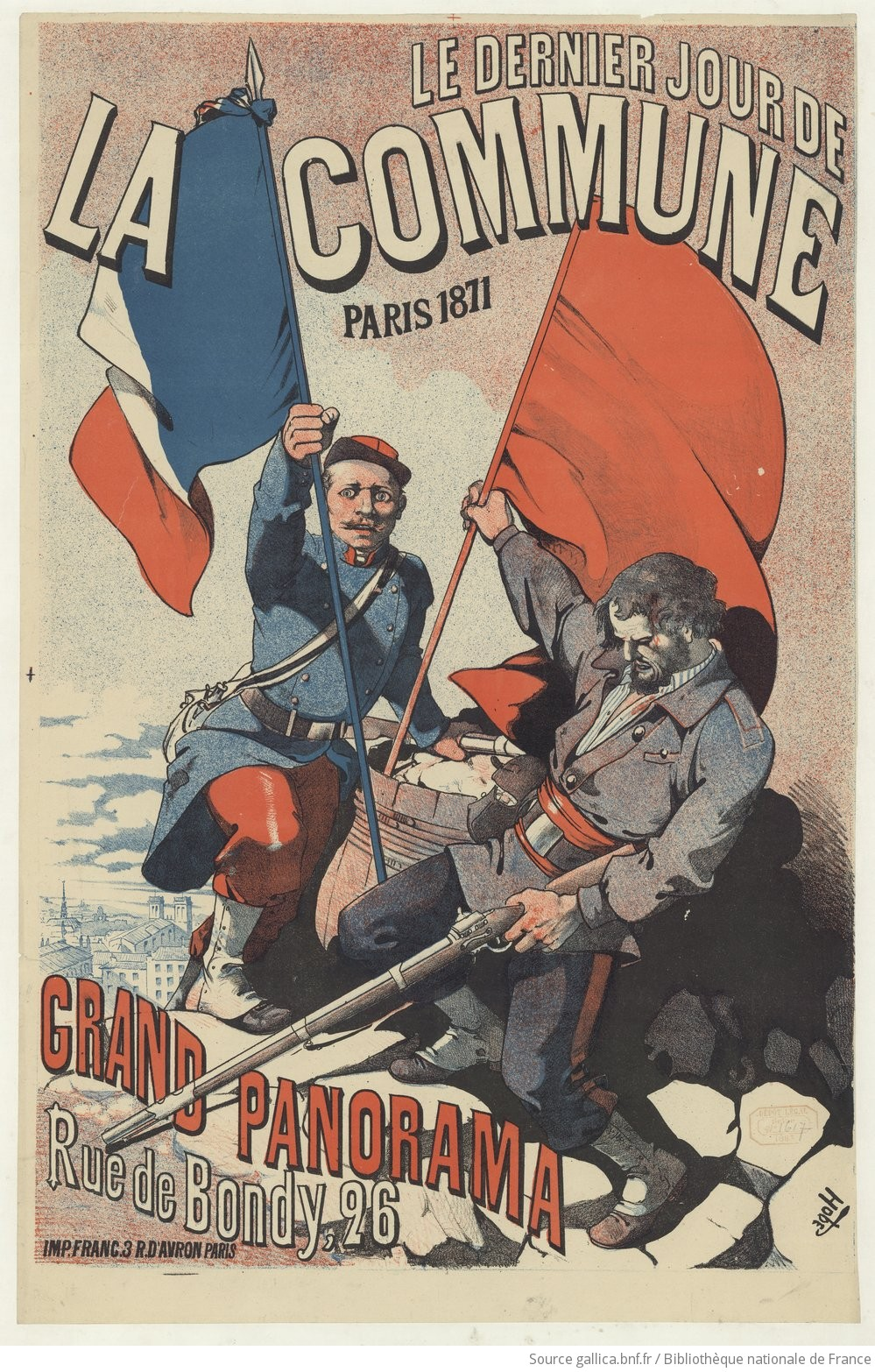
Advertising poster for a Panorama about the Paris Commune (1883)

== Sources ==
- (in French) Beraldi, Henri (1886). Les graveurs du 19e siècle; guide de l'amateur d'estampes modernes, Paris: L. Conquet
- Hiatt, Charles (1896). Picture Posters, London/New York: George Bell & Sons, MacMillan & Co.
- (in French) Maindron, Ernest (1896). Les affiches Illustrées (1886-1895), Paris: G. Boudet
- Verhagen, Marcus, The poster in Fin-de-Siècle Paris: "That Mobile and Degenerate Art", in: Charney, Leo & Vanessa R. Schwartz (eds.) (1995). Cinema and the Invention of Modern Life, Berkeley (CA): University of California Press, ISBN 9780520201125
