= Cinema Museum =

Cinema Museum may refer to:

- Adana Cinema Museum, Turkey
- Cinema Museum, England
- Cinema Museum (Girona), Spain
- Cinema Museum of Thessaloniki, Greece
- Melgaço Museum of Cinema, Portugal
- National Museum of Cinema, Italy

== See also ==
- Film Museum (disambiguation)
