= Sroczyński =

Sroczyński (feminine: Sroczyńska; plural: Sroczyńscy) is a Polish surname. Notable people with the surname include:

- Magdalena Sroczyńska (born 1982), Polish figure skater
- Ryszard Sroczyński (1905–1966), Polish painter and sculptor
