= Magda Bielesz =

Polish painter

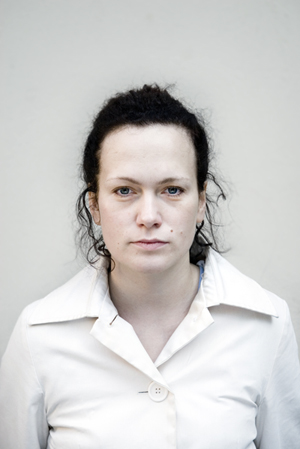
- Bielesz in 2007
- Born: March 25, 1977; Warsaw, Poland
- Education: Academy of Fine Arts in Warsaw
- Known for: painting, video art
- Website: http://www.darta.art.pl/magda/

Magda Bielesz (born 25 March 1977 in Warsaw) – painter, author of installations, objects, drawings, videos.

== Career ==
Graduated from the Faculty of Painting Academy of Fine Arts in Warsaw, diploma in Gościnna atelier of prof. Leon Tarasewicz (2002). As a student noticed by curators and critics, which resulted in the exhibition involving young artists Look at me / Spójrz na mnie, organized by Bunkier Sztuki Gallery in Cracow (2002) and Blok.osiedle.mieszkanie by Galeria Działań / Raster Gallery (2002). Individual exhibition debut was held in Small Salon of Zachęta National Gallery of Art in 2003. In 2002 received half-year scholarship from Ministry of Culture and National Heritage. In 2005 was nominated in the seventh Eugeniusz Geppert's competition, in an online vote winning the highest number of votes. She was on the monthly creative workshops (artist in residences), among others Wd8 Walkersdorf / Graz, Austria 2006 moxa, Mooste, Estonia (2006), / Aiji Art Center Abiko / Tokyo, Japan (2006). In 2006 received a six-month scholarship from Ministry of Culture and National Heritage and "Young Poland" scholarship. Has numerous exhibitions in the country and abroad. Her works are in the collections of Museum of New Art in Detroit, Zachęta National Gallery of Art, IHS University of Warsaw. Lives and works in Warsaw.

== Works ==
Magda Bielesz art is about subjects such as promise of happiness, life vitality, but also the problems of impaired body, old age – subjects not present in society communication, thus excluded. In terms of the artist, they regain their place in the natural cycle of life. In the Magdy Bielesz works, there is the hope and joy of life, often revealed in the children's fairy tale stylization. In her works she is dating back to the memories and dreams, relationships, health-illness relation. She would like to find and fix all the deficiencies and damages. Delving into the world of childhood improves memory, which often differ from the actual situation. Referring to childhood, she creates a kind of un growing mythology. The most recognizable series are: Maszyny, Lekcja pływania i Dzieci. As Bielesz sayes: In every area of my life I try to take from reality just as much as I need at the moment. I paint what I always missed, through my paintings fulfilling my dreams. Her paintings are very clean - one item or a single person on a white background. Joining to one another, creating an endless spatial arrangement. Often it goes beyond the image - a series of children on jumping ropes seems to jump out of the images. In the Room project, she made the first intervention in the architectural space of her studio (Night of Museums, 2009), and then in the extended version in spaces of Laznia Centre for Contemporary Art in Gdansk (2010). Thanks to the black line, new architectural elements are appearing, which she considered as missing, thus invites the viewer's imagination to run, crossing the physical barriers and symbolic passing through the wall. Bielesz also creates video works that are very similar to painting. Videos can be divided into two groups: one is a documentation of events, images that she records (Dobro, 100 obrazków, Chwilami nierealności), the other is as she says are paintings that are moving (Lekcja pływania, Złość piękności szkodzi, Gimnastyka). From Magda images raises fascination on the states that she is not able experience. On her paintings she often marks objects and characters by depriving them of light and shade and putting them on a neutral white background. This creates the illusion of their own lives, outside of context meanings, which they originated. This latter also applies to objects - talismans, which play an important role in her work. Bielesz creates them in short bursts: Poduszki do pływania we śnie, Universal memory (sachets of plant seeds), Universal dreams (sachets of seeds of plants), Universal Wish (sachet of pills: Meet ET, Sing as Johnny Cash, be lucky, change sperm taste - carrot, be born again, clone yourself etc.), KLOCKI, czyli zestaw do kreatywnego spędzania czasu and Crystal.

== Bibliography ==
=== Catalogs ===
- Magda Bielesz. mini catalog published on the occasion of the presentation of the diploma in Centre For Conterporary Art Ujazdowski Castle, Warsaw 2002
- Magda Bielesz. Maszyny, exhibition catalog, Zakręt Gallery, IHS University of Warsaw, Warszawa 2002
- Magda Bielesz. Czarodziejki z księżyca, exhibition catalog, Zachęta National Gallery of Art, Warsaw 2003
- Magda Bielesz. Oferta specjalna, exhibition catalog, Nova Gallery, Cracow 2003
- Magda Bielesz. Lekcja pływania, exhibition catalog, Baltic Gallery of Contemporary Art, Słupsk, 2004 catalog in form of a leporello
- Magda Bielesz, Pokój, Laznia Centre for Contemporary Art, Gdańsk 2010

=== Articles, password dictionary, notes directory, reviews, interviews ===
- M. Małkowska, Spójrz i idź, Festiwal młodej sztuki w Krakowie, Rzeczpospolita, August 2002
- M. Raczek, Novart.pl, Exit No.3(51)2002
- V. Sajkiewicz, novart.pl, Arteon No 8(28), August 2002
- Ursynów dziełem sztuki, nota o wystawie Blok.osiedle.mieszkanie, Passa No 25(108) 4 July 2002
- A. Kowalska, Cztery światy kobiece. Dyplomy 2002, Gazeta Stołeczna, 28–29.09.2002
- S. Szabłowski, Nowa galeria. Energia Zakrętu, City Magazine, October 2002
- A. Kowalska, Sztuka na zakręcie, Gazeta Stołeczna, 17.10.2002
- M. Himielewicz, Maszyny na zakręcie, Gazeta Stołeczna, 18–24.10.2002
- N. Dworzańska, Magda Bielesz. Magda, rysuj brzydziej, DLACZEGO magazyn dla studentów, Nr 44, December 2002
- A. Kłos, Bielesz w Entropii. Te banalne lata 80., City Magazine, April 2003
- Superkolekcja'80, Wieczór Wrocławia, 4–6.04.2003
- J. Tomalska, Sztuka i „Maszyny”, Kultura, April 2003
- Zapamiętane z dzieciństwa, Co jest grane, Gazeta Wyborcza, Wrocław, 4–10 April 2003
- Biennale Malarstwa BIELSKA JESIEŃ, exhibition catalog, Galeria Bielska BWA 2003 ISBN 83-87984-19-1.
- Notes na 6 tygodni, No 1, FUNDACJA NOWEJ KULTURY BĘC ZMIANA 2003 pages 2–7
- Młodzi zza zakrętu, Sekcja nr 9, 2003, ISSN 1642-2384.
- J. Muller, Uwspółcześniona wizja świętych. Rozmowa z Magdą Bielesz., Gazeta Stołeczna, 15 July 2003
- A. Kowalska, Czarodziejki z Księżyca. Wystawa obrazów Magdy Bielesz w Małym Salonie Zachęty, Gazeta Stołeczna, 11–17 July 2003
- H. Halak, Święte babcie, Uroda No 9/ September 2003
- B. Jagas Podwójna linia życia, Jestem, June 2003
- J. Nowicka, Krakowska Galeria Nova przedstawia nowe malarstwo. Oferta Specjalna, Rzeczpospolita on-line, No. 148/27 June 2003
- E. Nowacka Magda Bielesz. Hiro 10., Hiro No 10, 2003
- R. Dziadkiewicz, Magda Bielesz. Oferta specjalna!, City Magazine, June 2003
- R. Hazuki, Czarodziejka z Księżyca. Wystawa w Galerii Zachęta, Kawaii! No 05/2003 (45)
- Odrobina magii, Stołeczna Trybuna No 197 (4097)/ 25 August 2003
- Magda Bielesz w rozmowie, in A. M. Wasieczko, Dobra Wróżka „Elle”, September 2003
- Kondycja. Od soboty., Gazeta Wyborcza Cracow, 6–12 June 2003
- K. Rzehak, Życie codzienne i fantastyczne, Twój STYL, August 2003
- A. Kozłowska Niegrzeczna Magda, Gazeta Wyborcza Trójmiasto, 8 September 2004
- M. van Hulten, Wachten op de spurt De Volkskrant, Kunst, 16 September 2004, p 10-11
- M. Małkowska, Barbie kontra Rudowłosa, Rzeczpospolita 224(6907) 23 September 2004
- A. Kozłowska Które z nas są lalkami?, Gazeta Wyborcza Tri-City, 2–3 October 2004
- Pływanie bez wody, Głos Słupski No 261 (3932), 6–7 November 2004
- Salon Europeen des Jeunes Createurs, exhibition catalog, pages 95,97,99, Montrouge Paris 2005
- 7 Konkurs E. Gepperta, exhibition catalog, BWA Wrocław, 2005
- M. Małkowska, Prosta sztuka jest najlepsza, Rzeczpospolita, 4 January 2006
- A. Mazur, Na własną rękę, a nawet dwie. Pracownia Tarasewicza w Zachęcie, Obieg, January 2006
- Midagi on teisiti, MoKS Center for Art and Social Practice, page 2, MoKS, Mooste, Estonia 2006
- PostsovkhoZ 1-6. MoKSi kunstisumpoosioni antologia/ An Anthology of MoKS International Art Symposium, Estonia 2006 ISBN 978-9949-15-013-7.
- Magda Bielesz, in Tekstylia bis. Słownik młodej polskiej kultury, Korporacja Ha!art, Cracow 2006 ISBN 978-83-89911-43-8.
- J. Sokołowska, Magda Bielesz, in Na własną rękę, exhibition catalog, Zachęta National Gallery of Art, Warsaw 2006
- Wenn Wünsche Bilder werden, Südoststeiermark Anzeigen, 27 April 2006
- Ch. Bagni, Ausstellung im Schweinestall als Auftakt, Kleine Zeitung, 10 May 2006
- 7. Konkurs im. Eugeniusza Gepperta, page 16, „Format. Pismo artystyczne” 2006, No 48
- Abiko Open Air Exhibition 2006 9th, page 18, kat wyst., Abikoe, Tokio, Japan 2006
- Wymężczyźnienie-rozmężczyźnienie, exhibition catalog, Zakręt Gallery, IHS University of Warsaw, Warsaw 2006
- Wd8 Connected:07, Kunst im Schweinestall, Wd8 Austria 2007 ISBN 978-3-200-01119-9.
- A. Kowalska, Urodziny w kawalerce. Galeria Hoża 1 urodziny, Gazeta Stołeczna, 25–31 January 2008
- M. Stadtmüller, Galeria Hoża obchodzi pierwsze urodziny, Polska the Times, page 28, 31 January 2008
- WIR e. V., Berlin, 2008
- Magda Bielesz. Malerei., strona 95, TIP Berlin, 08/2008, 03.04-16.04.2008
- A. Kowalska, Warszawa w Berlinie, Gazeta Stołeczna, page 8, 9.04.2008
- Galeria Hoża, strona 24-25, Hiro, nr 36, March 2008
- Stypendyści Ministerstwa Kultury i Dziedzictwa Narodowego w latach 2002-2006, CD, Zachęta National Gallery of Art publishing house, Warsaw 2007
- M.Domagała Tetania. Powiew boskości,, Exit, No.2(78) 2009 pages 51–56
- A. Krenz, M Slaski, Zero. Berlin 2003-2009, pages 100,194, book on the doings of Berlin's Zero Gallery
- A. Kowalska, „Gazeta co jest grane” poleca, page 22, Gazeta Stołeczna, 26 March 2009
- NOTES 51, page 28, Mogę być kim chcę, Notes na 6 tygodni, 2009
- Pożegnanie z bajką, exhibition catalog, BWA Wrocław, 2010
- NOTES 58, pages 70, Notes na 6 tygodni, 2010
- D. Karaś, Nitka i mieszczańskie salony, Gazeta Wyborcza Trójmiasto, 15.01.2010
- Kalendarium, Polish Institute in Prague, January 2010
- Malarstwo współczesne. Postewolucja, exhibition catalog, 2010 KKKC „Kulturpolis” ISBN 978-9986-588-38-2.
- A. Kowalska, Prezent dla ojca, page 7, Gazeta Stołeczna, 31.05.2011
- Art Experts Magazine, page 19, Nr. 01/02, June/August 2011
- REJENERASYON.011, Platosanat, exhibition catalog, Istanbul 2011, T.C. Plato Meslek Yüksekokulu
- Obraz i wideo łączą się w sztuce, page 7, Gazeta Wyborcza (Zielona Góra) No.16, 20.01.2012
- Z. Haczek, Sztuka ma płeć? Już nie!, Gazeta Lubuska, 02.03.2012

== Films and documents ==
- METRUM 3, written and directed by: Przemysław Młyńczyk, pictures: Andrzej Musiał, montage: Marek Krol, music: Marcin Ejsmund, cast: Magda Bielesz, Paul Wertico, produkcja FMK 2005, 5 min
- Case X (Case MoKS, Mooste) directed by: Rene Rusjan, Bostian Potokar, Slovenia 2006, 40 min
- who is who. Magda Bielesz, directed by: Anna Kuśmierczyk, pictures: Marcin Nowak, production: fabryka mediów patio TV, Łódź 2007, 30 min
