= Cyprian Kamil Norwid Memorial =

Monument in Warsaw, Poland

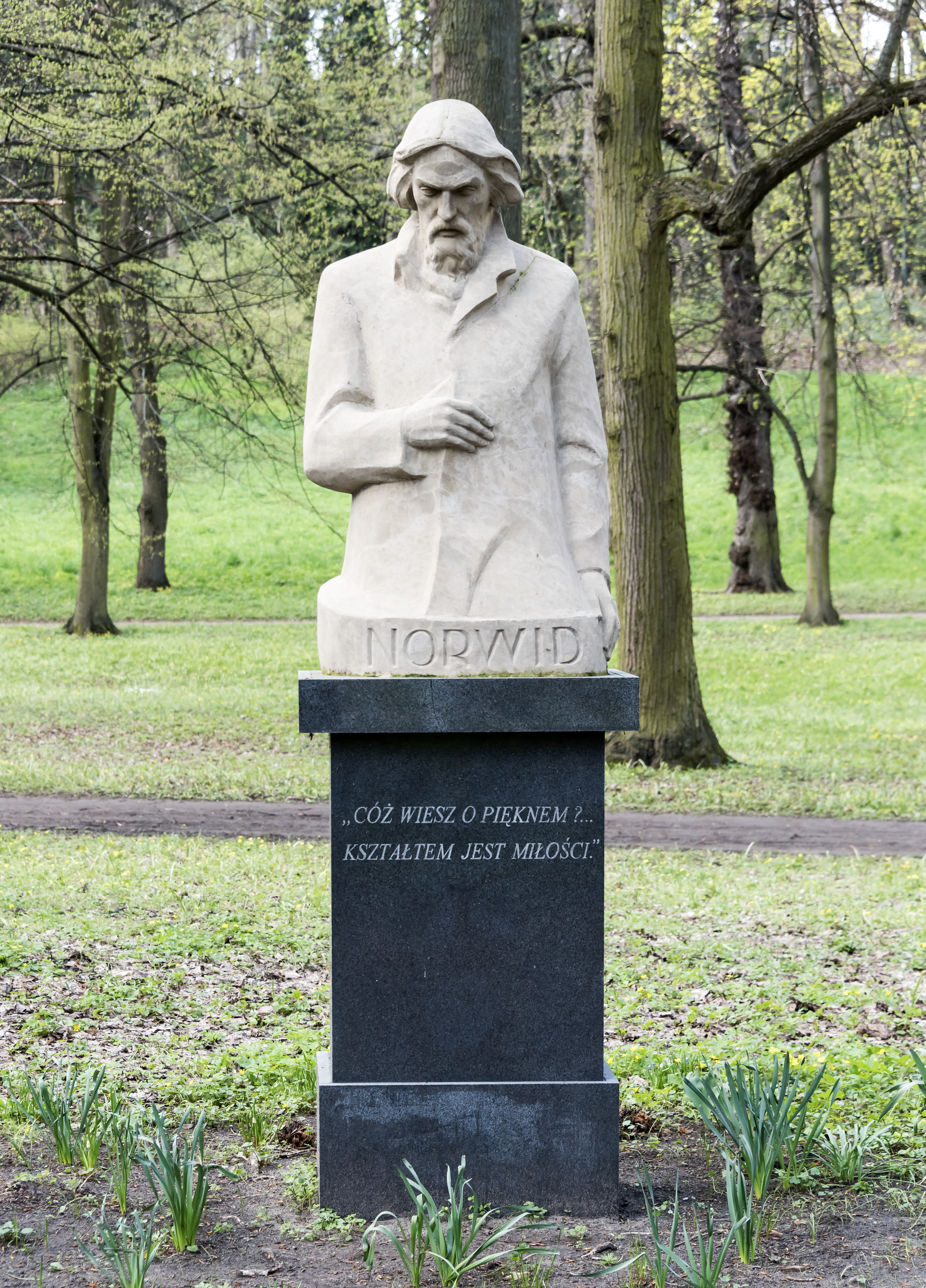
- The monument in 2023.
- Interactive map of Cyprian Kamil Norwid Memorial
- Location: Royal Baths Park, Downtown, Warsaw, Poland
- Coordinates: 52°12′51.487″N 21°01′54.214″E
- Designer: Julia Keilowa
- Type: Sculpture
- Material: Stone (statue); granite (pedestal)
- Opening date: 2006
- Dedicated to: Cyprian Kamil Norwid

Cyprian Kamil Norwid Memorial (Polish: Pomnik Cypriana Kamila Norwida) is a sculpture in Warsaw, Poland, within the neighbourhood of Ujazdów in the Downtown district, in the Royal Baths Park. It has a form of a white stone sculpture of Cyprian Kamil Norwid, a 19th-century writer, poet, painter sculptor, and philosopher, placed on a granite pedestal. The monument, based on a sculpture by Julia Keilowa, was unveiled in 2006.

== History ==
The monument was dedicated to Cyprian Kamil Norwid, a 19th-century writer, poet, painter sculptor, and philosopher. It was a replica of a sculpture by Julia Keilowa, and it was unveiled in 2006, the 185th anniversary of the year of Norwid's death.

== Characteristics ==
The monument is placed in the central portion of the Royal Baths Park. It is located within the neighbourhood of Ujazdów in the Downtown district.

The white stone sculpture depicts the upper half of Cyprian Kamil Norwid, wearing a long coat, and with a hand placed on his chest. His head is tiled down. At the bottom of the sculpture is written "Norwid". It is placed on a granite pedestal, that has text that reads "Cóż wiesz o pięknem?… Kształtem jest miłości", and translates to "And what do you know about beauty?… It is the shape of love". It is a quote from Norwid's 1851 long poem titled Promethidion.
