= Bogna Burska =

Polish playwright and artist

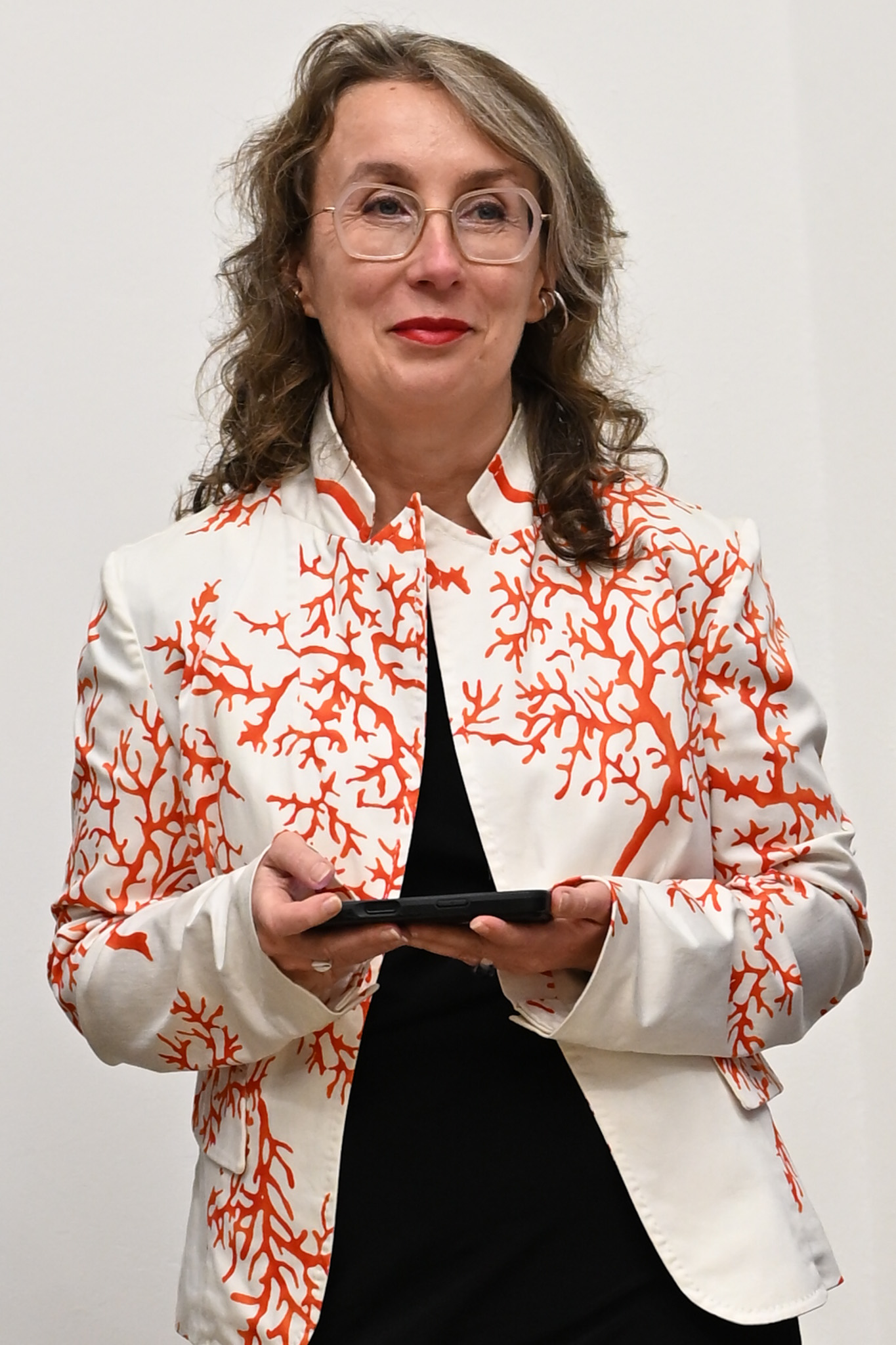
- Born: 1974 (age 51–52); Warsaw, Poland
- Education: Warsaw Academy of Fine Arts
- Known for: Visual artist; Playwright

Bogna Burska (born 1974) is a Polish playwright and visual artist known for installations, spatial photography and video. Her art is presented from a feminist perspective. Her initial painting compositions were narratives of congealed blood forms made with red paints applied by fingers on the walls, canvas and glass.

Burska established the Warsaw Artists Action (WAA) organization in 2002. She also co-edited a Polish art magazine titled Internet Feminist and Gender Art Magazine Artmix which was the first of its kind dealing with subjects related to feminism and gender equality. She resides in Warsaw and works in Gdańsk. Her works have been exhibited throughout Poland and also abroad in many countries. Her art work has been described as a blend of "critical art and aesthetic issues." Her dedication to the cause of feminist movement is better expressed by quoting her own words: "I’m an artist, woman and feminist. I work on a variety of subjects including femininity and its faces. But whatever I'm preoccupied with at any moment, feminist issues are always of great importance to me".

== Biography ==
Bogna Burska, born in 1974 at Warsaw, Poland, was educated in the subject of art at the Painting Department of the Academy of Fine Arts in Warsaw from where she received a degree in 2001.

Burska started her career in 2006 from Gdańsk as faculty member in the Intermedia department of Grzegorz Klaman at the Sculpture Department at the Gdańsk Academy of Fine Arts. At the academy, she continued her doctoral studies and obtained a doctoral degree (PhD) in 2009. She is associate professor at the Intermedia Faculty at the Gdańsk Academy of Fine Arts.

Burska's art work covered a multitude of techniques like painting, a combination of media installation projects, photography, and video.

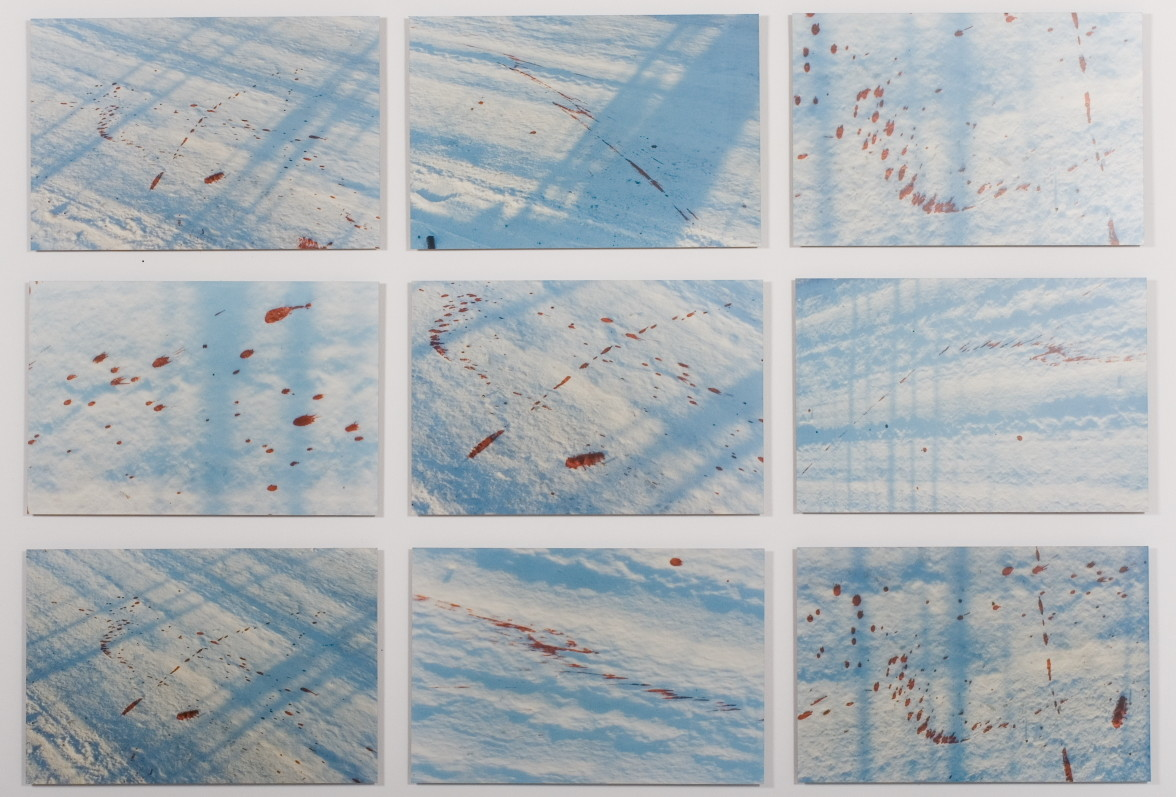
"Droga" from the permanent collection of Zachęta National Gallery of Art (Warsaw, Poland)

Burska's debut works were related to "corporeality" (physical body) and its appreciation with blood colour dominating her hand made paintings. She also painted on glass and "resin casts"; her adoption of red colour symbolizing blood denotes not only "life and vitality, but also death, violence, pain, and female physiology." Some of her creations in this genre, done during 2001 and 2002, are:

- creating a passage totally in blood colour which flowed over the white walls in which three pairs of hands of men and women were embedded. This was created by her students at a workshop organized at the Centre for Contemporary Arts in Warsaw. The viewers of this exhibit were brought face to face to a realization of the aspect of violence without being aware of the creator and sufferers of such violence;
- another installation of this shocking variety was created in 2002 at the Biała Gallery where an ambience of a home was created within the gallery with rooms for parents, a child, a painting of a child on the wall and blood stains on an unoccupied bed indicative of several interpretations such a violence or even women's monthly cycle;
- a photo series in which pictures of flowers, surgery, algorithm (Algorytm), peony flowers in bloom, and scene of an amputated leg were also blended aesthetically and geometrically;
- and some of her geometrically presented photographic series consisted of "Droga" made in 2003 with 9 pictures, Thaw (Odwilż) in 2003 consisting of 25 photos, "Book (Książka)" in 2004 comprising 24 pictures showing the pattern of blood stains on snow contrasting with views of the sky.

In the "Arachne" (name of a lovely weaver in Greek mythology) created by Burska in 2003, was a blend of a video and a set of photos, in which a giant, a fearsome hairy spider or "bird spider" is shown moving in the well turned up bedroom or boudoir of a woman. In this Burska presents women's issues of "passions and fears" and beauty and ugliness. It is based on the story of Athena and Zeus.

Burska's innovative technique practiced from 2004 onward relates to the "technique of found footage video" based on films. In this genre the works she created, which received appreciation, are "Rain in Paris" (Deszcz w Paryżu) in 2004 incorporating snippet scenes of love and eroticism made in Paris such as Queen Margot, Marquise, Dangerous Liaisons, Frantic, Henry & June, Poison Pen ( ), The Lovers on the Bridge, and Night Wind.

From 2006 to 2008, Burska produced a number of works on the theme of "A Game with the Shifting Mirrors" (Gra z przemieszczającymi się zwierciadłami)". In another series she created a new story by drawing on scenes from three films – Chinese Box, Lolita, and Damage.

== Exhibitions ==
Burska has held solo and group exhibitions of her art work not only in Poland but also in many other countries. Some of the shows held by her are:

Solo exhibitions at:

- National Gallery of Art Zachęta, Warsaw
- Gallery of Contemporary Art Bunkier Sztuki, Kraków
- Wyspa Art Institute, Gdańsk
- City Gallery Arsenal, Białystok
- Kronika Art Center, Bytom
- Biala Gallery, Lublin
- Platan Galerie in Budapest
- Mystetskyi Arsenal in Kyiv
- PL Gallery in Rome.

Group exhibitions at:

- CAIXA Cultural, Brasília
- Latvian National Museum of Art, Riga
- Galerie für Zeitgenössische Kunst Leipzig
- Neuer Berliner Kunstverein, Berlin
- National Center for Contemporary Arts, Moscow
- The Contemporary Art Center, Vilnius
- Estonian Art Museum Exhibition Hall, Tallinn
- Thessaloniki Museum of Photography
- La Centrale Electrique European Center for Contemporary Art, Brussels
- Museo Arte Nuoro
- O Museu Nacional do Conjunto Cultural da Republica, Brasília

== See also ==
- Art in Poland
