= Adam Niklewicz =

American artist

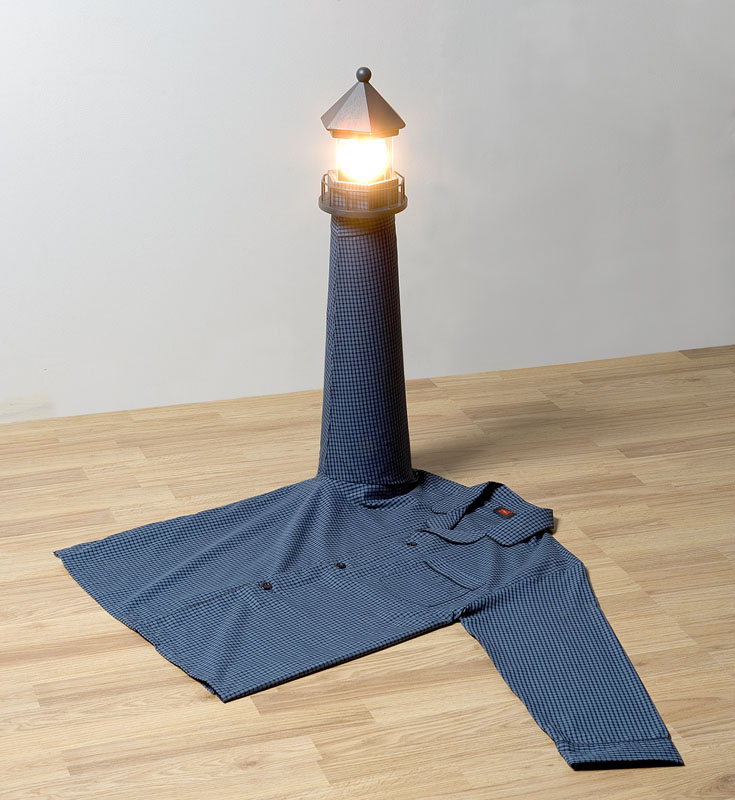
SOMETIME LAST JANUARY I AWOKE IN THE MORNING WITH MY HAND UP, 2005 mixed media

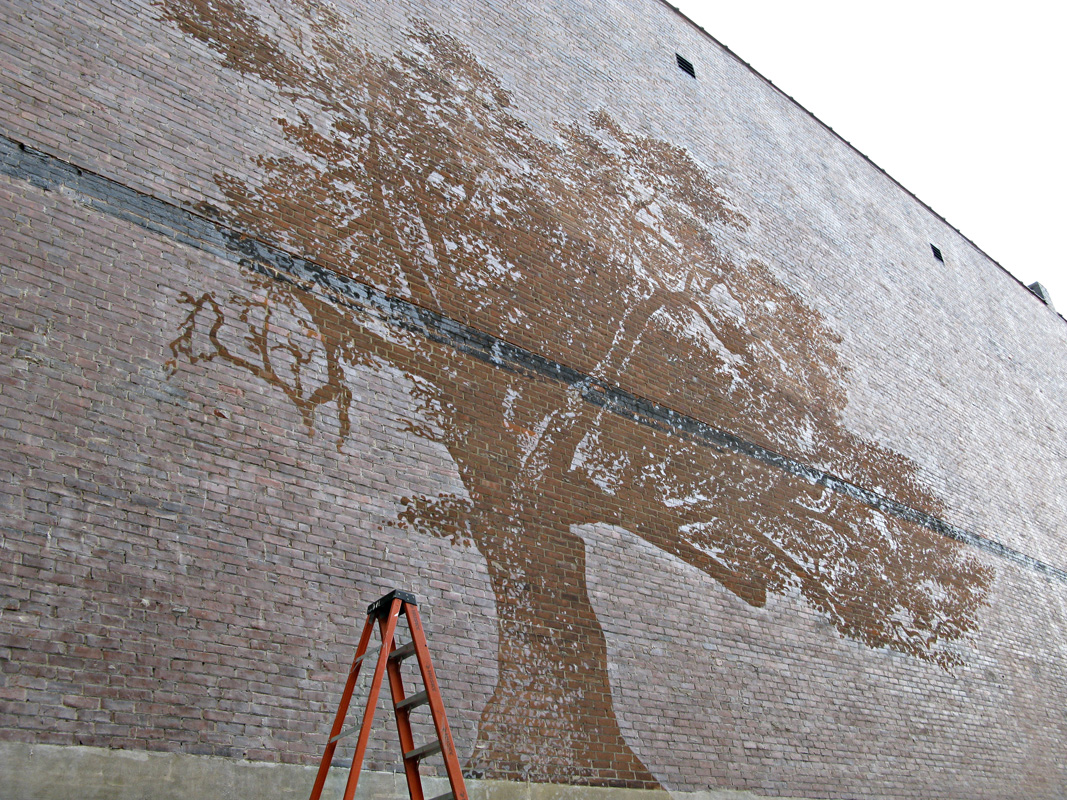
THE CHARTER OAK, 2012 water-mural

Adam Niklewicz (born in 1956 in Zamość, Poland) is a Polish-born American sculptor who earned his BFA in graphic communications in 1989 from Washington University in St. Louis, and his MFA in sculpture from SUNY Purchase in 2006. His work has been featured and discussed in ARTnews, CNN Sculpture Magazine, Modern Painters, Art New England, The New York Times, and The Nation (in Poland – in Artpunkt, Exit, Format, and Obieg), among others. He has shown at such venues as Grounds for Sculpture, Hudson Valley MOCA, Real Art Ways, the New Britain Museum of American Art, Black & White Gallery, Five Myles, Stamford Museum, Benito Greene, Galeria Sztuki Wspolczesnej (Opole, Poland), and Zacheta (Warsaw, Poland).

In 2017, CNN Style presented four of his works in a feature story titled "Extraordinary in the Ordinary: These Warped Works Will Melt Your Mind." His work will be featured on a billboard in Ciudad Juárez, Mexico during Benitos Greene's Seventh Edition of Arte en Escala Urbana (summer of 2026).

== Affiliated galleries and museums ==
- Black & White Gallery / Project Space, Brooklyn, NY
- Grounds for Sculpture / International Sculpture Center, Hamilton, New Jersey
- Hudson Valley MOCA, Peekskill, NY
- Real Art Ways, Hartford, CT
- New Britain Museum of American Art, New Britain, CT
- Wadsworth Atheneum Museum of Art, Hartford, Connecticut
- Benito Greene
- Galeria Sztuki Współczesnej w Opolu, Opole, Poland
- Zacheta, Warsaw, Poland
