= Film Museum =

Film Museum may refer to:

- Austrian Film Museum
- China National Film Museum
- Film Museum, Brussels
- Korean Film Museum
- Niles Essanay Silent Film Museum
- Latvian Film Museum
- London Film Museum
- Oregon Film Museum
- Shanghai Film Museum

== See also ==
- Cinema Museum (disambiguation)
