= Kostas Kolokythas =

Kostas Kolokythas (born 1961) is a Greek born visual artist based in Athens. Photographic works of his belong to the collections of the Macedonian Museum of Contemporary Art, Thessaloniki Museum of Photography and the Hellenic Centre for Photography.

He is an associate professor at the University of West Attica, where he teaches at the photography department.
