= Ewa Walawska =

Polish printmaker (born 1943)

Ewa Walawska (born 1943) is a Polish printmaker.

A native of Warsaw, Walawska studied with Andrzej Rudziński at that city's Academy of Fine Arts, graduating in 1967; she remained at the academy for further study in the Faculty of Graphic Arts before becoming a full professor on its faculty from 1995 until 2013, running a graphic studio. From 1995 until 2000 she taught at the European Academy of Arts in Warsaw. Walawska received the Gold Medal for Merit to Culture – Gloria Artis in 2013. Her work has been featured in numerous international exhibitions, and she is represented in the collection of the National Gallery of Art.
