= Academy of Fine Arts in Warsaw =

Art school in Warsaw, Poland

- Akademia Sztuk Pięknych w Warszawie
- Type: Public
- Established: 1844; 182 years ago 1932
- Rector: Adam Myjak
- Academic staff: 62
- Students: 1,625 (Dec 2023)
- Address: Krakowskie Przedmieście 5, 00-068 Warszawa, Warsaw, Poland; 52°14′22″N 21°00′57″E
- Campus: Urban
- Website: Official website

Academy of Fine Arts in Warsaw (Polish: Akademia Sztuk Pięknych w Warszawie) is a public university of visual arts and applied arts located in the Polish capital. The academy traces its history back to the Department of Arts founded at the Warsaw University in the Duchy of Warsaw in 1812. As a separate institution it was founded in 1844 in Congress Poland. In an upgrade in 1904 it was named the Warsaw School of Fine Arts; and in 1932 it received recognition as an academy. At first the institute did not have its own building and classes were held in several locations around the city. Following an architectural competition a design by Alfons Gravier was chosen and construction began in 1911. The building was completed by the outbreak of the First World War.

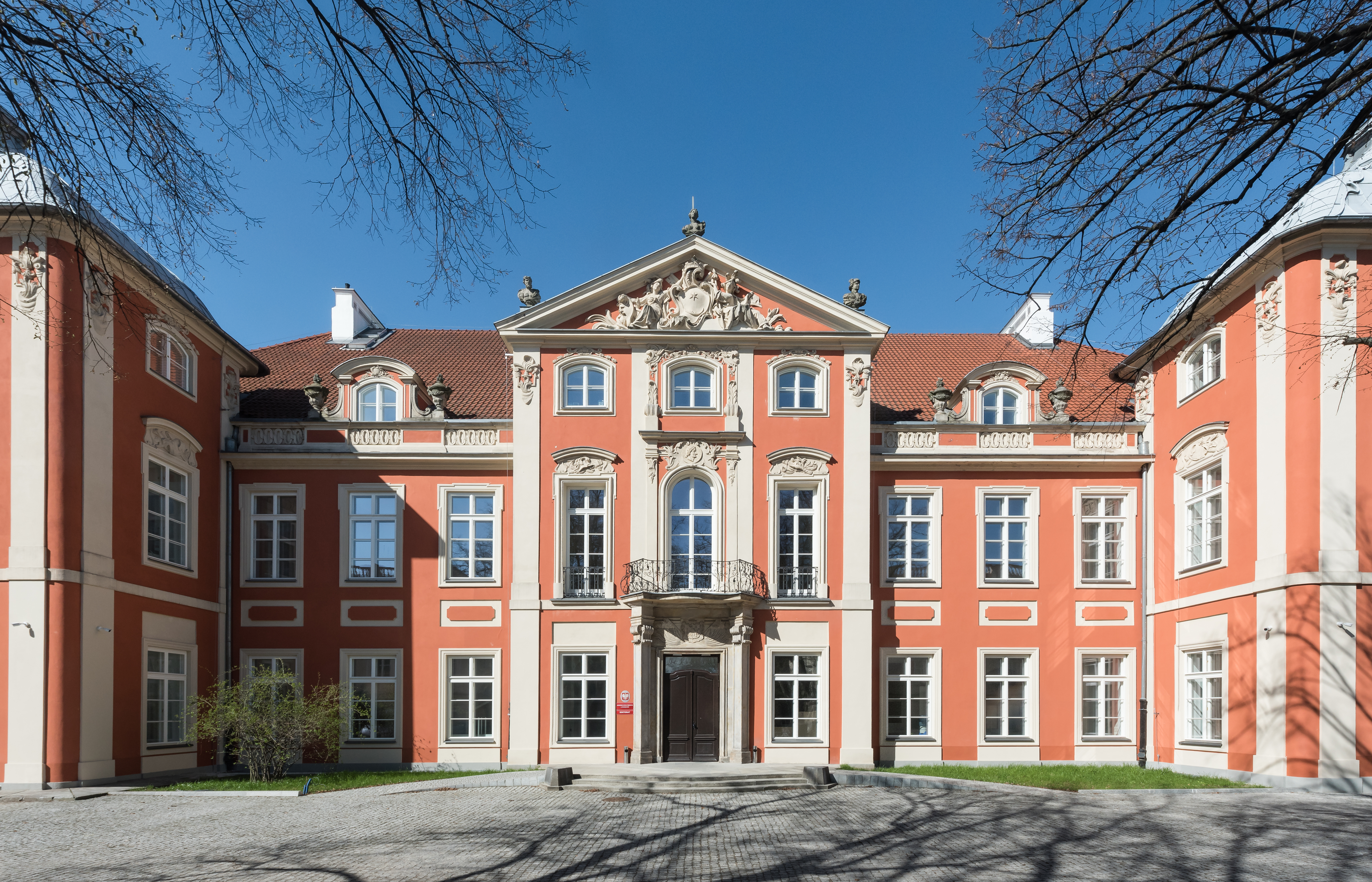
Czapski Palace in Warsaw

== Faculties ==
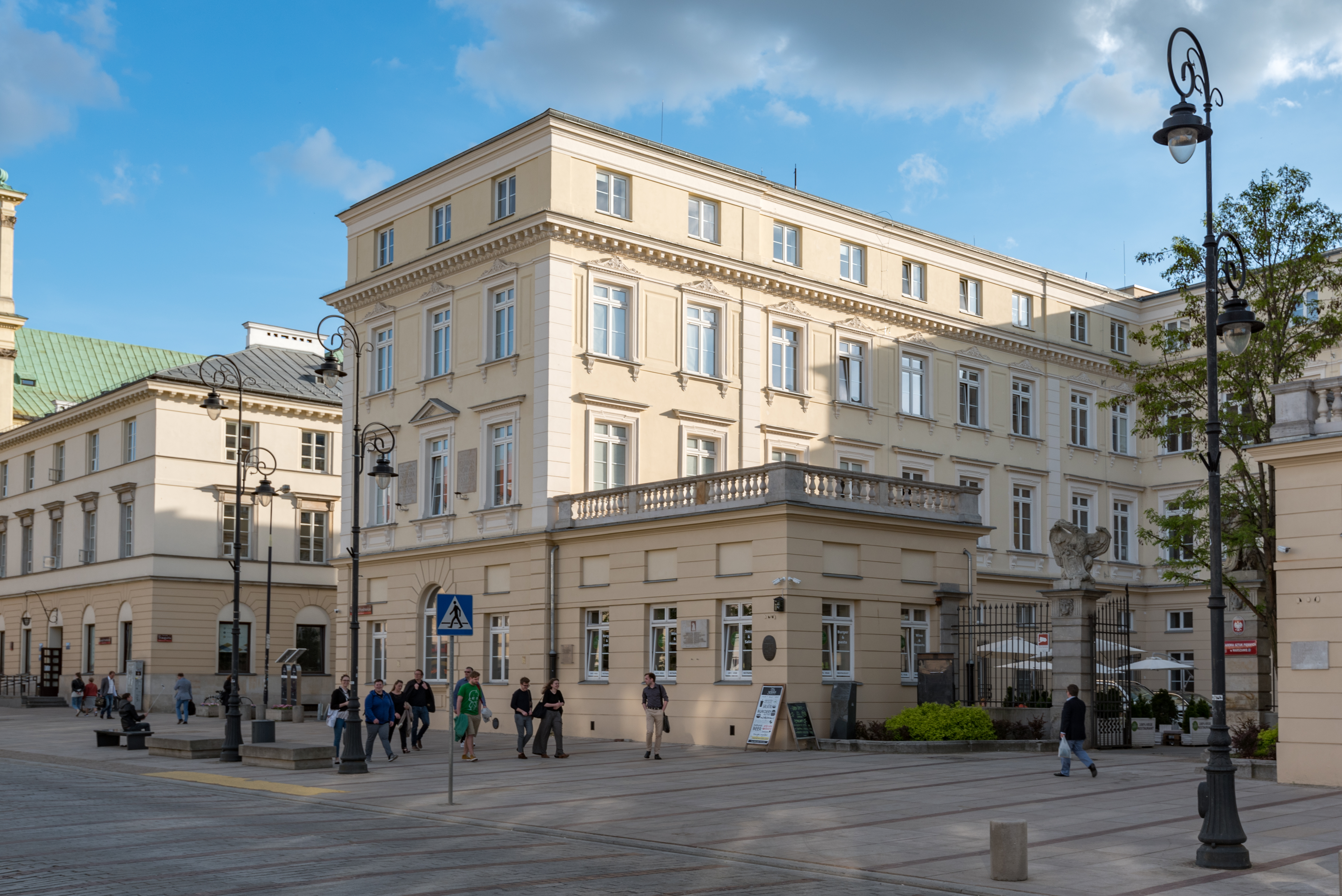
Czapski Palace, seen from Krakowskie Przedmieście

- Faculty of Painting
- Faculty of Sculpture
- Faculty of Graphic Arts
- Faculty of Conservation and Restoration of Works of Art
- Faculty of Interior Design
- Faculty of Industrial Design
- Faculty of Media Art

== Notable students and faculty ==
- Magdalena Abakanowicz (1930–2017)
- Bronislaw Abramowicz (1837–1912)
- Piotr Abraszewski (1932–1939)
- Mirosław Bałka (1958)
- Magda Bielesz (1977–)
- Bogna Burska (1974)
- Caziel (1906–1988)
- Halina Chrostowska (1929–1990)
- Mikalojus Konstantinas Čiurlionis or Czurlanis in Polish (1875–1911)
- Marian Czapla (1946–)
- Wojciech Fangor (1922–2015)
- Wojciech Gerson (1831–1901)
- Chaim Goldberg (1917–2004)
- Wiktoria Goryńska (1902–1945)
- Stanisław Horno-Popławski (1902–1997)
- Krzysztof Jung (1951–1998)
- Kali (1918–1998)
- Julia Keilowa (1902–1943)
- David van de Kop (1937–1994)
- Katarzyna Kozyra (1963–)
- Jeremi Kubicki (1911–1938)
- Bronisław Linke (1906–1962)
- Lech Majewski (1947)
- Witold Manastyrski (1915–1992)
- Eugeniusz Geno Malkowski (1942–2016)
- Karol Mondral (1880–1957)
- Ryszard Sroczyński (1905–1966)
- Boguslaw Szwacz (1912–1982)
- Antoni Słonimski (1895–1976)
- Wanda Telakowska (1905–1986)
- Henryk Tomaszewski (poster artist) (1914–2005)
- Ryszard Winiarski (1936–2006)
- Aleksander Żyw (1905–1995)
