= Bronisław Abramowicz =

Polish painter

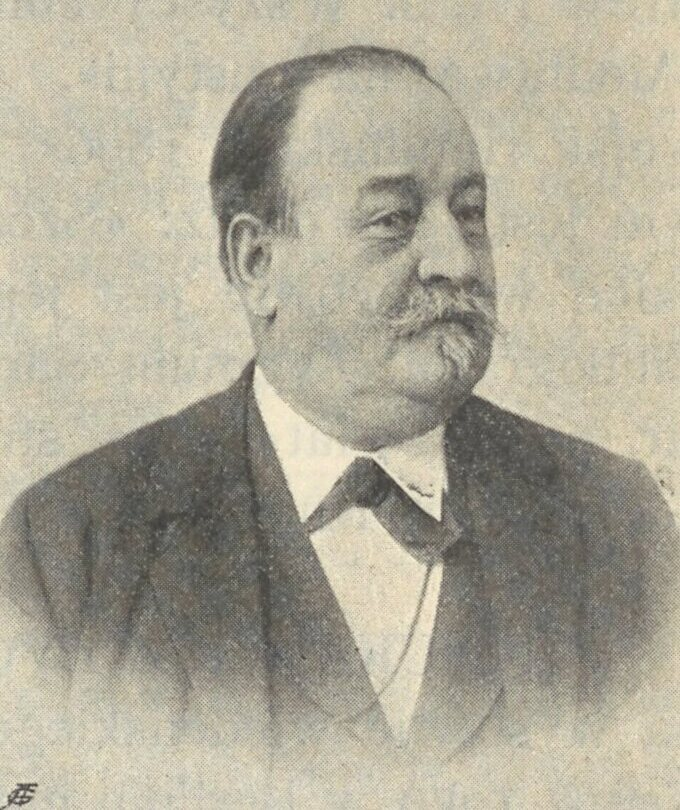
Bronislaw Abramowicz

Bronisław Abramowicz (1837–1912) was a Polish painter, born in Załuchów.

In the years 1858-1861 he studied at the Academy of Fine Arts in Warsaw. He continued to study painting in the academy of fine arts in Munich and Vienna. He also graduated from the Academy of Fine Arts in Kraków. He painted historical paintings, genre scenes and portraits of hunting, including Bavarian King Ludwig III (1867). From 1868, he participated in exhibitions in Kraków. His works of art restoration are found in old churches of Kraków and his paintings in the national gallery.
