= Piotr Abraszewski =

Polish painter

- Born: June 29, 1905; Zamość, Congress Poland, Russian Empire
- Died: June 9, 1996 (aged 90); San Francisco, California, U.S.
- Education: Academy of Fine Arts in Warsaw

Piotr Abraszewski (June 29, 1905 – June 9, 1996) was a Polish painter born in Zamość, Poland. From 1928 to 1934 he studied at the Academy of Fine Arts in Warsaw with Professor M. Kotarbinski, and in 1935 he became Assistant Professor at the Academy. Between 1936 and 1939 he taught at the Academy and in other Warsaw schools.

== World War II ==
When Nazi Germany attacked Poland on September 1, 1939, German Nazis began rounding up and killing the local intelligentsia (see: Operation Tannenberg) and forbade all higher education except for vocational ("useful") training. Abraszewski survived five different Nazi concentration camps, including the Wildflecken Labor Camp and Mauthausen, where he made minute sketches for the administration.

Unwilling to return to Communist-ruled Poland after the Second World War, Abraszewski spent several years in Polish Displaced Persons camps in Germany where he taught art to refugees. In 1949, Abraszewski arrived in San Francisco with his wife who also graduated from Academy of Fine Arts in Warsaw, and who also survived Nazi concentration camps. Piotr Abraszewski painted scenes of San Francisco in oil and watercolor.

It was Piotr Abraszewski’s dream to paint frescoes in churches and public buildings. In the mid-1950s he worked as a commercial artist at The Emporium. He was a member of the Western Artists Society. Several of his paintings were exhibited at the M. H. de Young Memorial Museum in Golden Gate Park.

When Mr. Abraszewski became a member of the Polish Arts and Culture Foundation (established in 1966 in San Francisco), he participated in historical exhibits, created hand-made signs still in use today and, with encouragement of the Foundation, exhibited his work.

He painted scenes of Europe as well as a series of oils and watercolors of San Francisco. Several years before Mr. Abraszewski fell ill, ten of his favorite paintings were photographed and produced as postcards. Mr. Piotr Abraszewski died in 1992 (his wife preceded him in death by several years). In his will, Piotr Abraszewski donated his entire art collection to the Polish Arts and Culture Foundation. Some of these works are now in private collections.

== See also ==
- The Holocaust in art and literature
- Playland (San Francisco)
- San Francisco visual arts
