= Wiktoria Goryńska =

Polish painter and graphic artist

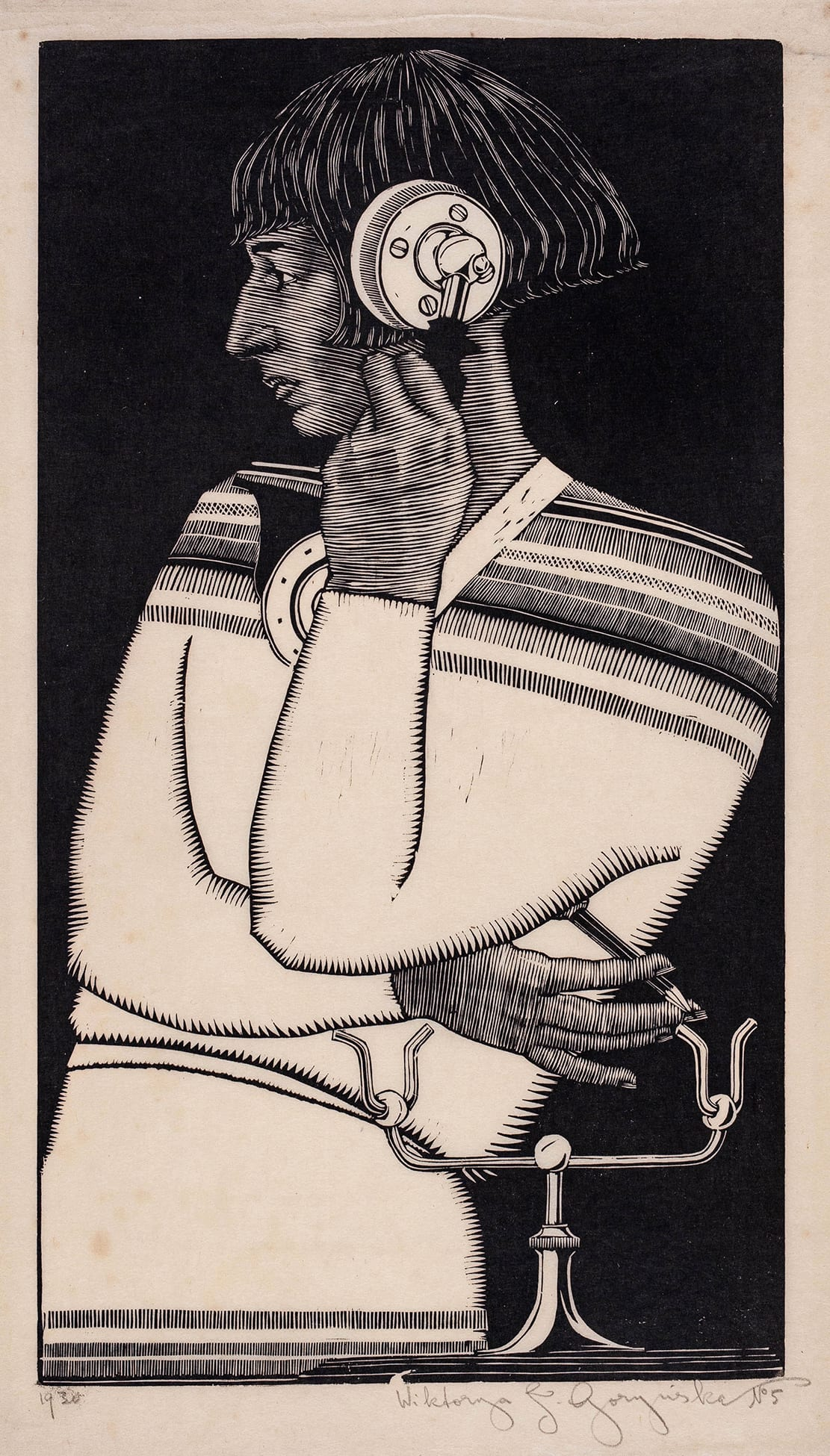
- Wiktorya Goriniska – 98167 – Autoportret z telefonem – 1930
- Born: 6 July 1902; Vienna
- Died: 29 March 1945 (aged 42); Ravensbruck
- Education: Academy of Fine Arts in Warsaw

Wiktoria Julia Jadwiga Goryńska (6 July 1902 – 29 March 1945) was a Polish painter and graphic artist.

== Early life and education ==
Wiktoria Julia Jadwiga Goryńska was born on 6 July 1902 in Vienna to journalists Stanisława (née Markheim) and Maksymilian. She spent her childhood in Britain, and then returned with her parents to Vienna, where she studied at the Kunstgewerbeschule (now the University of Applied Arts Vienna).

In 1918 she moved to Warsaw, where she continued her education at the School of Fine Arts under the supervision of Konrad Krzyżanowski. Then she lived in Berlin for some time, returning to Warsaw, where she again studied at the Szkole Sztuk Pięknych (the School of Fine Arts), and in the studios of Tadeusz Pruszkowski and Władysław Skoczylas. She worked in the medium of woodcuts.

== Career ==
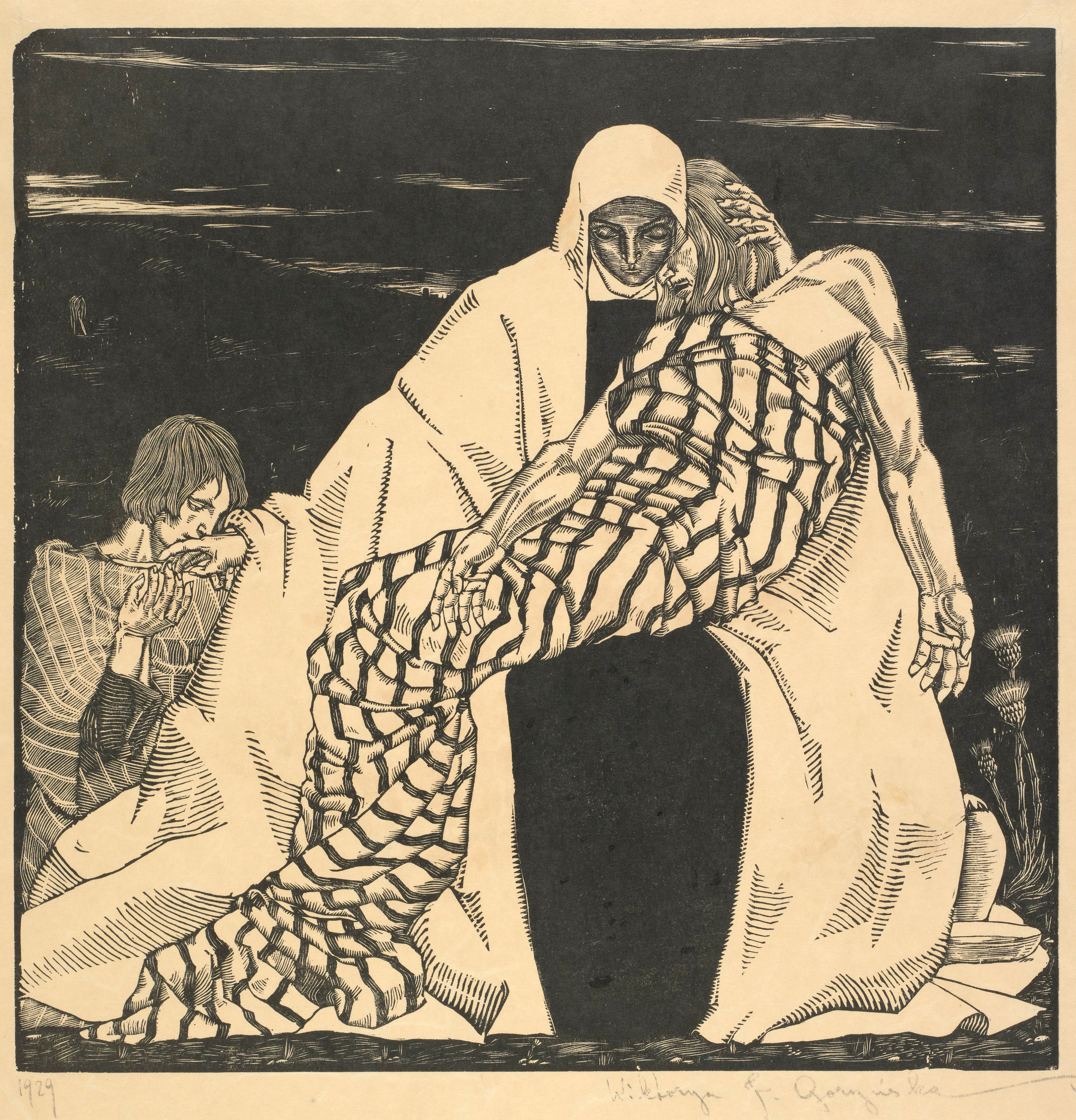
Pieta, Wiktoria Goryńska

Goryńska belonged to Stowarzyszenia Artystów Grafików "RYT" the Association of Graphic Artists, an artistic group which ran between 1925 and 1939 in Warsaw with the aim of perfecting the art of woodcut. She was also a member of the Association of Polish Graphic Artists.

In 1931, the first individual exhibition of Goryńska's work was held at Towarzystwie Zachęty Sztuk Pięknych (the Warsaw Society for the Encouragement of Fine Arts). In 1932 she was awarded a gold medal at an exhibition in Florence for a Pieta woodcut and a silver medal for illustration in the book Sól polskiej ziemi (Salt on Polish soil) at the Art and Technology exhibition in Paris in 1937.

She also wrote essays on art for both the Polish and foreign press, reviewed exhibitions and translated press texts. She gave lectures for Polish Americans on Polish Radio, the national public-service radio broadcasting organisation.

Goryńska created religious, fantasy and animalistic woodcuts, dealt with book graphics, and by September 1939 had created over a hundred works. The collection of the National Museum in Warsaw holds 44 of her woodcut blocks. The British Museum holds 14 of her prints.

Goryńska was one of the first women in Poland to practice fencing and wrote articles about it for the press.

== World War Two ==
During the Nazi occupation, she was active in the underground, using the pseudonym "Leti". From 1943, she was a liaison officer at the Main Headquarters of the Home Army, where she was assigned to Oddziału VI BiP of the Biuro Informacji i Propagandy (Division VI of BiP, the Information and Propaganda Office). She was a member of the editorial board of the Biuletyn Informacyjny.

After the failure of the Warsaw Uprising, she was sent to a transit camp, and from there to the concentration camp in Ravensbrück, where she died.
