= Wanda Telakowska =

Polish artist (1905–1986)

Wanda Telakowska (1905–1986) was a Polish artist and the founder of Warsaw's Institute of Industrial Design.

Telakowska earned a degree from the Academy of Fine Arts in Warsaw in 1931. She was a member of the Spółdzielnia Artystów ŁAD (pl), an Arts and Crafts artist collective that encouraged a new Polish artistic identity that included folk art. After World War II, Telakowska joined the Communist government in Poland, creating the Bureau of Supervision of Aesthetic Production (Biuro Nadzoru Estetyki Producji, known as BNEP) in 1946. As the head of BNEP, she commissioned artists (including some from ŁAD) to design many mass-produced Polish goods, under the BNEP motto of "Beauty is for everyday and for everybody." In her role, Telakowska protected and sponsored modernist artists. Some artists were suspicious of collaborating with the Communist government during a time of continued political conflict. Ultimately, BNEP shut down, as the value of artist designs was not convincing enough to factory owners.

Telakowska went on to found Warsaw's Institute of Industrial Design (Instytut Wzornictwa Przemyslowego, or IWP) in 1950 and served as its first director. The IWP was state-funded, organized within the Ministry of Culture and Art. In this role, she "invited artists, ethnographers, art historians, pedagogues, sociologists, and enthusiasts of folk art to contribute to her institute's efforts to develop new forms of sociologist culture in collaboration with working women, peasants, and youth." Telakowska fostered a movement to weave ethnic motifs into a new national artistic identity. Echoing BNEP's slogan, IWP's was "Everyday Beauty for All." Telakowska stepped down as director in 1968. IWP continues to publish and foster art and design.

Some Polish artists have dismissed Telakowska's legacy as a failed attempt to work with Stalinists. Her work was part of the painting event in the art competition at the 1936 Summer Olympics.
