= Aleksander Żyw =

Polish artist (1905–1995)

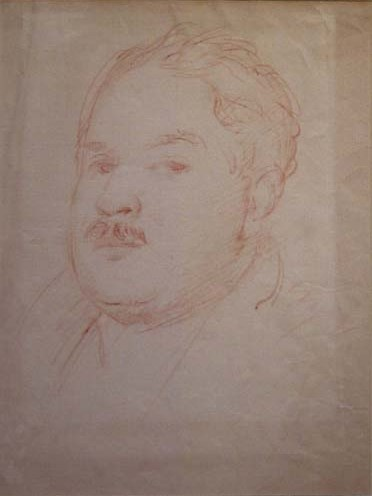
Roman Kramsztyk – Portrait of Aleksander Żyw (1935–1939), sanguine on paper, 43.8 x 32.4 cm (17.25 x 12.75 in), private collection

Aleksander Zyw (29 August 1905 – 17 September 1995) was a Polish artist who lived and created especially in France, United Kingdom and Italy.

== Early life ==
Aleksander Żyw was born in Lida at that moment in the Vilna Governorate of the Russian Empire in 1905. His father Jacob Żyw was a prominent lawyer and his mother was Leonie Winogradow. Zyw studied at the Academy of Fine Arts in Warsaw under the teaching of Tadeusz Pruszkowski. In 1934 he was awarded a scholarship to travel around Europe, much of which he traveled on foot. It was around the Mediterranean where Żyw adopted the style of a neo-impressionist painter, focusing on the landscapes of the Mediterranean Coast. He had set up a studio in Paris he was however in Corsica, when World War II broke out.

== War time ==
He joined fellow Poles in France where the Polish Army was reforming. After training, Żyw was promoted to Sergeant and served with the heavy machine gun unit in the 2nd Regiment of 1st Division of Grenadiers. Soon after the French surrendered they were ordered to try to make their way to Britain where the Polish Army was regrouping. After a miraculous escape through France, Spain and Portugal, Żyw made his way to Scotland where he was appointed war artist to the Polish army, where he served again in 1944 in the liberation of France. He is well remembered for his war drawings which are record of his real skill as a draughtsman. His most famous work of this period is the painting Landing at Arromanches (1944), which has been shown along with other works at The Imperial War Museum in London and The Boundary Gallery, also in London. Scotland was to be his base for the next twenty six years of his life, after marrying Leslie Goddard, an Edinburgh local, and buying and renovating Bell's Brae in Edinburgh's historic Dean Village.

== Post war ==
It was in this direct post-war period where Żyw finally had time to experiment in his art. The war had changed Zyw, the shock and awe of brutal conflict as well as the realization of what had become of his family and homeland had engendered a serious stylistic change. These factors turned Zyw's art immediately inward and away from naturalism. And as he struggled for self-expression he produced a series of paintings featuring puppets and lay figures, symbols of helplessness and inability in the face of evil powers. This period did not last long however, and his travels back to Paris and discovery of Paul Klee had a direct influence on his art, and reminded him that painting was a positive and good creative effort, rather than purely an emotional outlet. His work in the 1950s saw him become a valued part of the Edinburgh scene, a scene which saw him exhibit with the likes of Anne Redpath and William George Gillies. In the 1950s, Żyw visited the Venice Bienniale and spent time in Desenzano del Garda where he exhibited and also met the poet Gino Benedetti, who was a great friend and wrote about his painting.

== Later life ==
It is in this period, in the late 50s, when Żyw moved out of the public eye, and does not exhibit again until 1967. In the late 1960s Żyw turned his mind and brush to new subjects which coincided with his return to public exposure. By 1970 Aleksander and Leslie Żyw had moved to Tuscany, Italy, where Zyw split his time between painting and olive farming. Here Żyw returned to nature, focusing his efforts on the intimate details of certain objects, including the gnarled carcass of an olive tree. His next focus was on ethereal aspects of nature, the elements. His painting explored the mysterious forces of energy. The energy which compels artists to paint and the energy which dictates the motion and power of air, fire and water. In the final period of his work made in the 1980s, Żyw finally admits to transcendental imagery. His Meteor series can be read with a definite Christian sub-text.

Aleksander Żyw died at his home near Castagneto Carducci on 17 September 1995.

Aleksander Żyw can be seen as one of the finest emigre painters to emerge from Poland in the twentieth century. His career which spanned seven decades saw exhibitions across Europe, in Warsaw, Paris, Edinburgh, London and Milan, to name but a few. His work is held in many collections, private and public including Tate Britain. The most notable publication which features Aleksander Zyw is written by Douglas Hall, and is entitled Art in Exile, Polish Painters in Post-War Britain (2008).
