= Shanghai Film Museum =

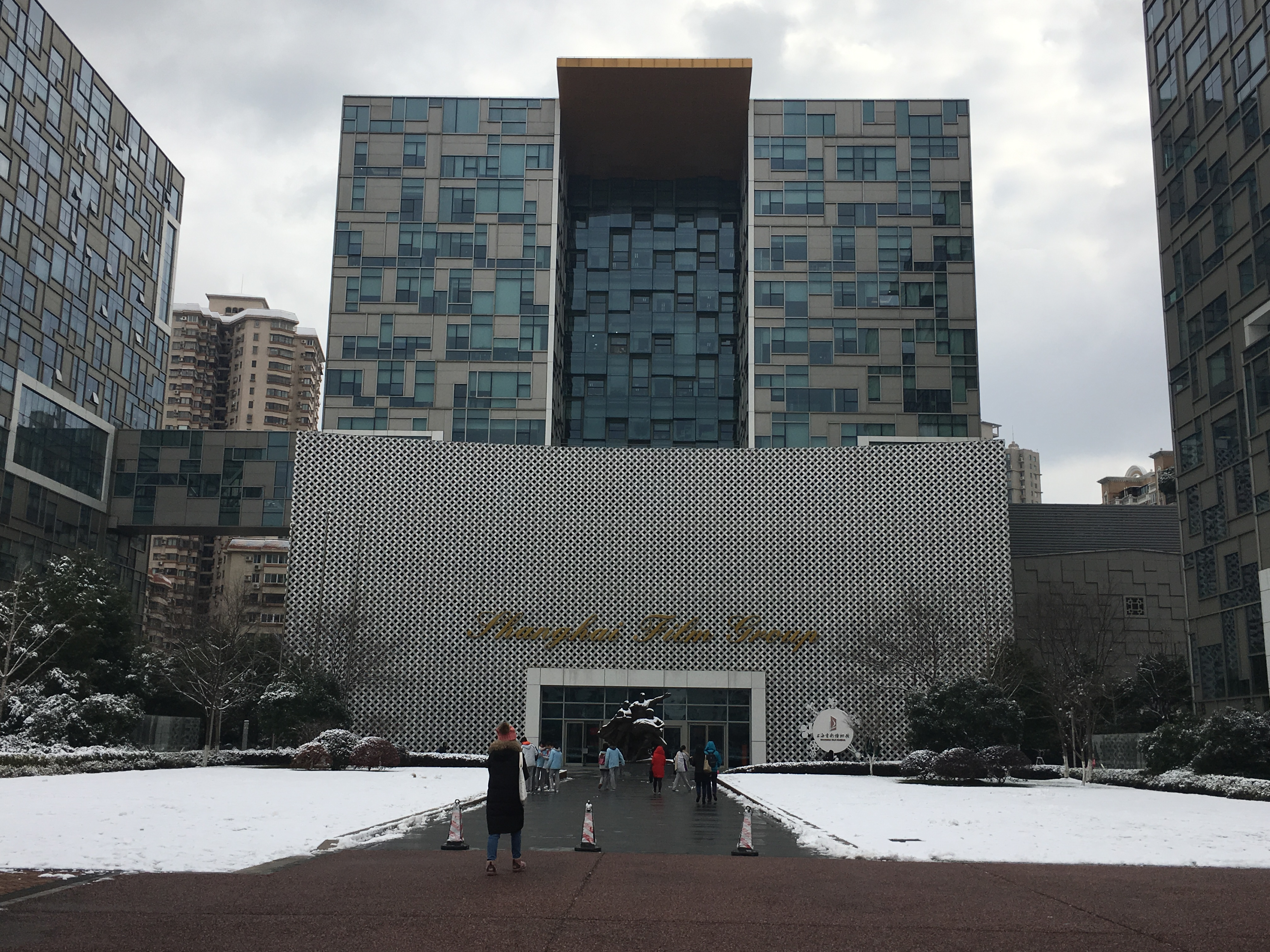
- Shanghai Film Group Block A houses the museum.
- Location: 595 North Caoxi Road, Xuhui District, Shanghai
- Coordinates: 31.18821°N 121.43357°E
- Type: Film museum
- Public transit access: Shanghai Indoor Stadium station, Shanghai Metro
- Website: www.shfilmmuseum.com

The Shanghai Film Museum (Chinese: 上海电影博物馆) is a museum in Shanghai, China, located at 595 North Caoxi Road in Xuhui District. The exhibition area is 15,000 square meters. Combining interaction, observation and experience, Shanghai Film Museum features many film cultural activities, historical relic collections, academic research, social education, and exhibitions. The museum contains four main exhibition units and an art cinema. It opened on June 17, 2013.

== Exhibits ==
The Shanghai Film Museum has four floors, each featuring different themes.

=== 1st Floor: Hall of Honor ===
Shanghai is the cradle of Chinese cinema. This exhibition area showcases the tremendous contributions Shanghai cinema made to China's societal development and historical progress over the past century from a variety of angles, including “A Century’s Splendor,” “Moments of Glory,” “Birth of the National Anthem,” “Shining Golden Trophies,” and “the Many Firsts.”

=== 2nd Floor: Memories in Light and Shadow ===
This exhibition hall features filmmakers, film scenes, and film exhibition. It encompasses five parts: “Walk of Fame,” “Galaxy of Stars,” “Achievements of Masters,” “Nanjing Road in the Limelight” and “A Century’s History of Film Distribution and Exhibition.” Along the “Walk of Fame,” visitors will be bathed in the limelight and feel the same glow and glory that belong to a star. The “Galaxy of Stars” and “Achievements of Masters” sections showcase the outstanding figures in the Shanghai film industry, including accounts about their life and work, archival materials and historical documents, as well as some of the items they used in everyday life. The “Nanjing Road in the Limelight” section reproduces the shooting scenes of some Shanghai film classics. The “A Century’s History of Film Distribution and Exhibition” section walks visitors through the history and development of film theaters in Shanghai, offering visitors a delightful taste of the enduring vitality of Shanghai cinema through mini-replicas, old advertisements, and over one hundred film posters from different periods of time.

=== 3rd Floor: The Long History of Cinema ===
At the end of the 19th century, as a new invention, film was introduced into Shanghai. Between the 1910s and the 1940s, as an important medium for cultural communication and promotion, cinema quickly took root and eventually flourished in the cosmopolitan city of Shanghai. This exhibition hall showcases the historical development of Shanghai cinema in the past century and introduces visitors to the remarkable achievements of Shanghai cinema from six angles: the origin because of polytechnicity.

=== 4th Floor: Film Workshops ===
This exhibition area explores the mystery of filmmaking and opens a window to the world of cinematic dreams. Visitors can witness the creative process of filmic works and experience the enthralling allure of cinema as a dream-making medium.
