= Ryszard Sroczyński =

Polish painter and sculptor

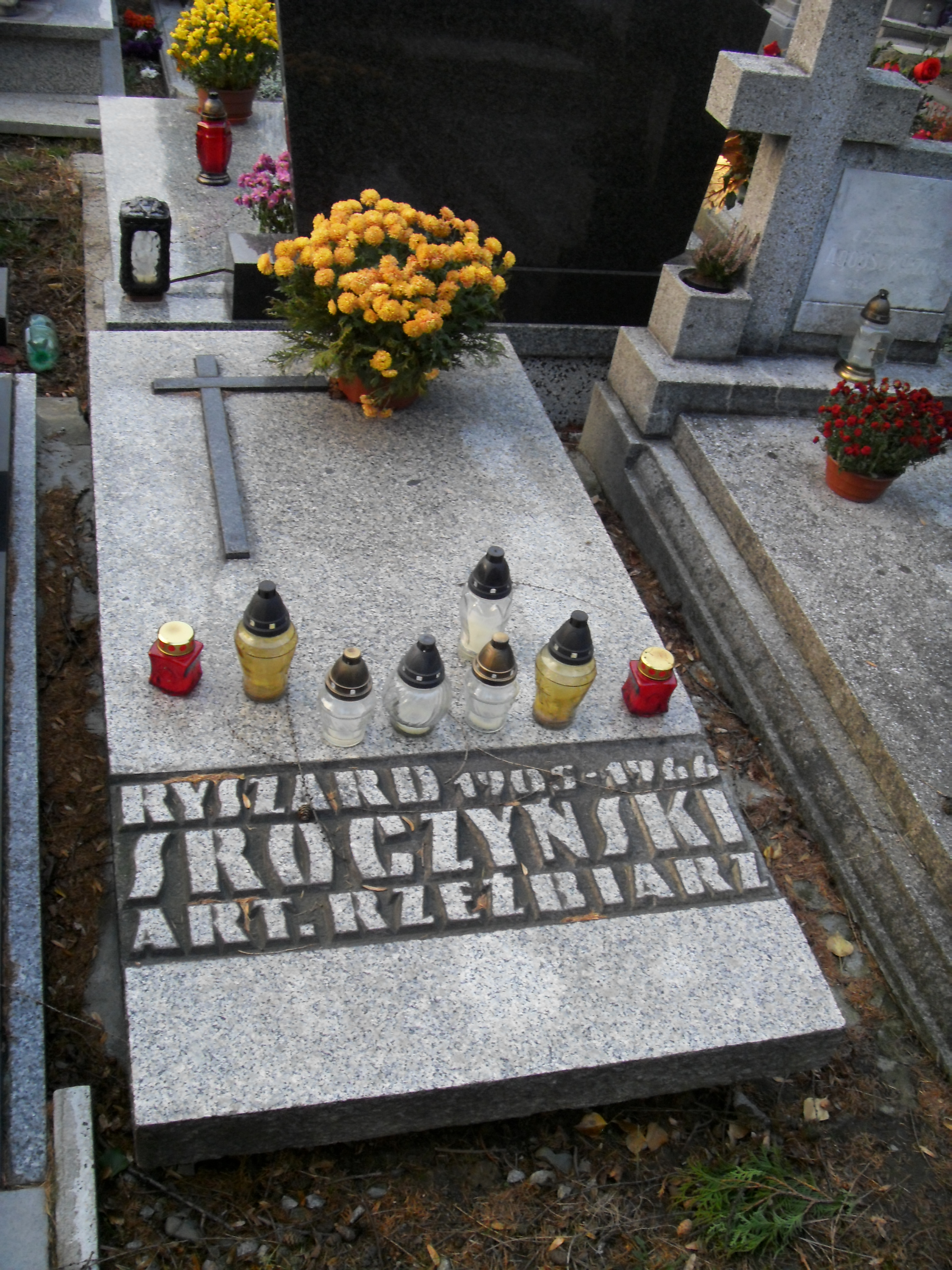
- The grave of Ryszard Sroczyński
- Born: 8 May 1905
- Died: 3 August 1966 (aged 61); Bielsko-Biała, Poland
- Education: Academy of Fine Arts in Warsaw
- Known for: Painting, Sculpture

Ryszard Sroczyński (8 May 1905 – 3 August 1966) was a Polish painter and sculptor.

He was a student of Academy of Fine Arts in Warsaw where his teacher was Karol Tichy.

In 1946 he settled down in Bielsko-Biała where he created his work and was an active member of Association of Polish Artists and Designers.

Sroczyński lived in Bielsko-Biała until his death on 3 August 1966.

== Works ==
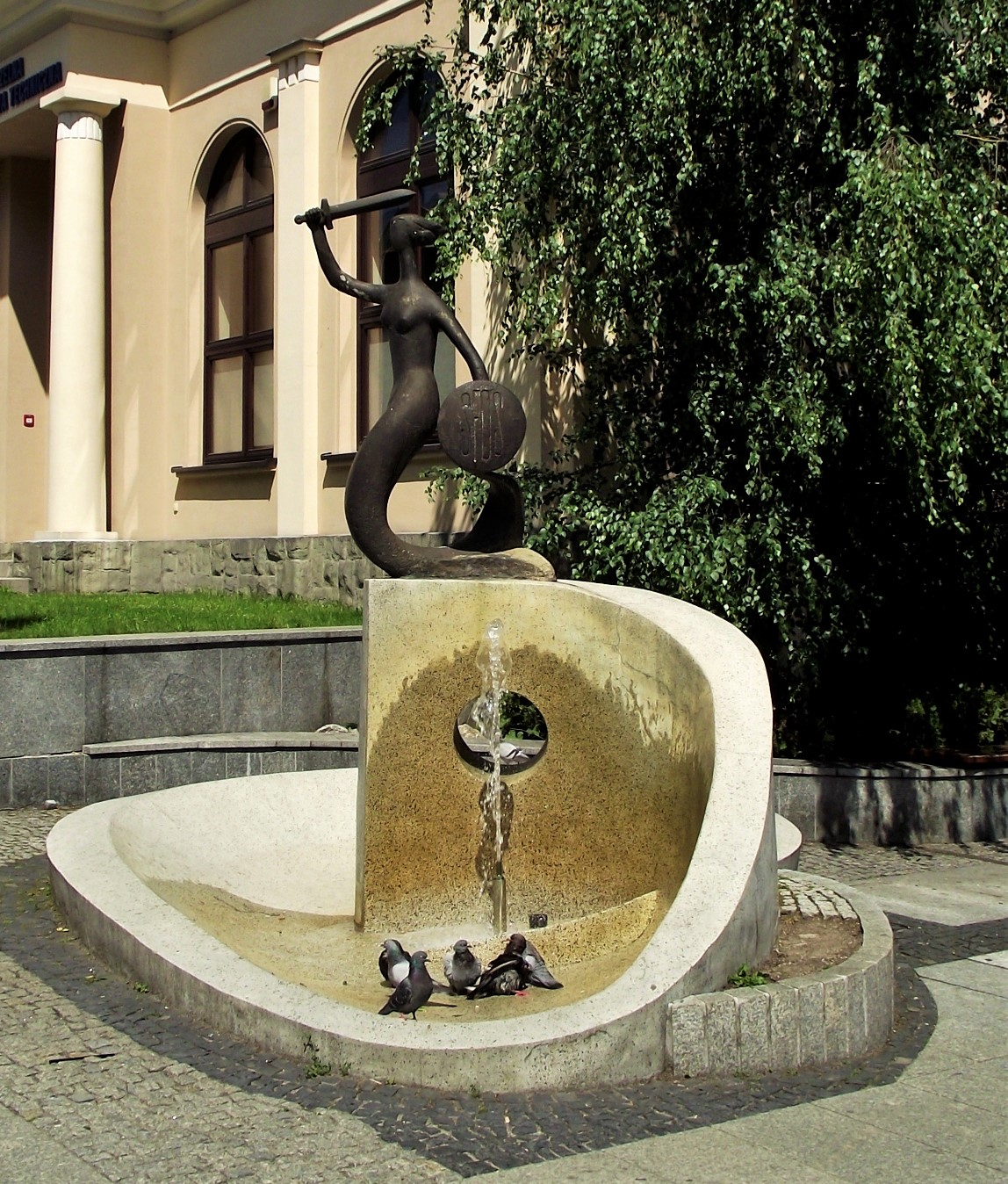
Monument of the Mermaid of Warsaw

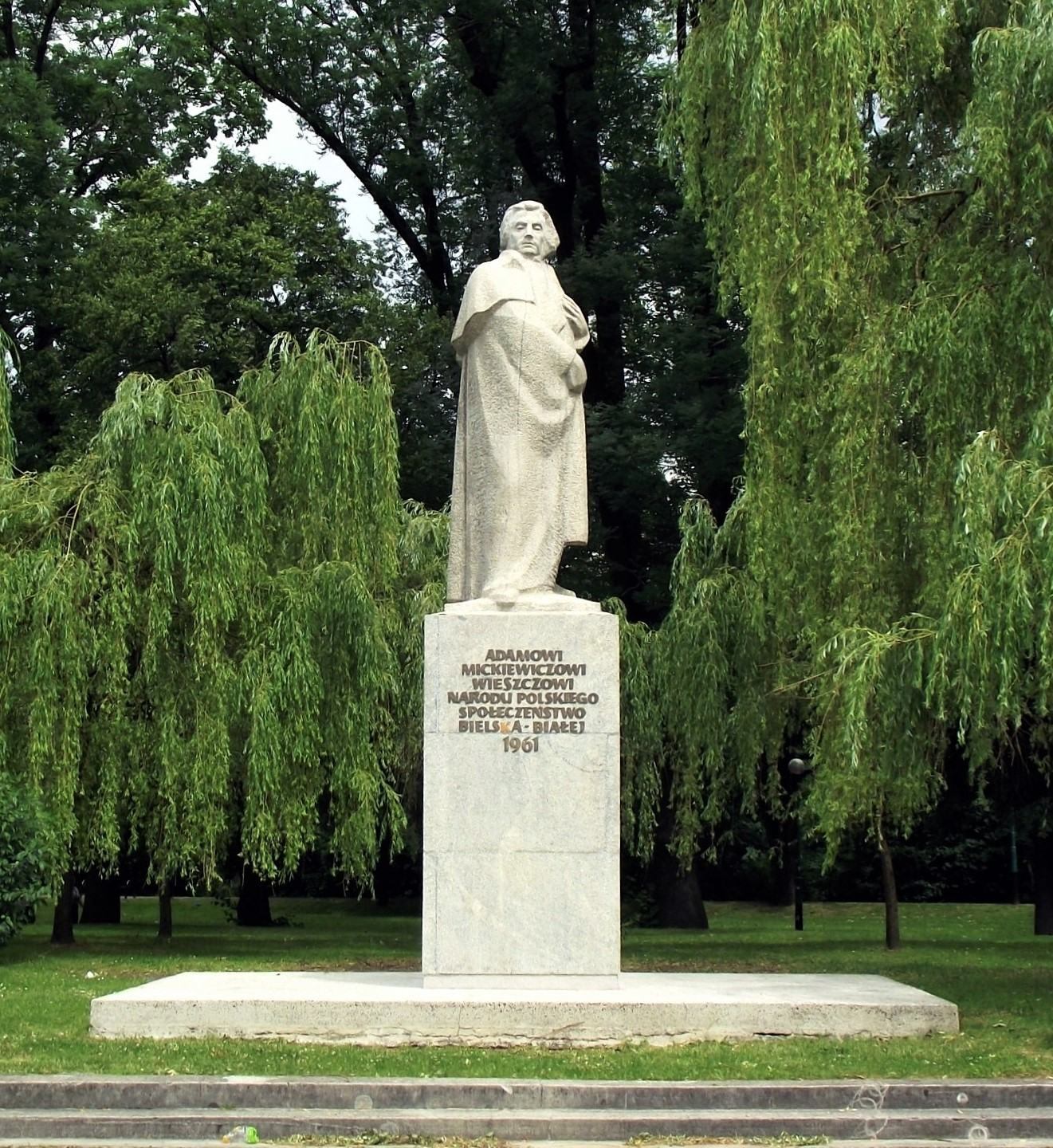
Monument of Adam Mickiewicz in Włókniarzy Park

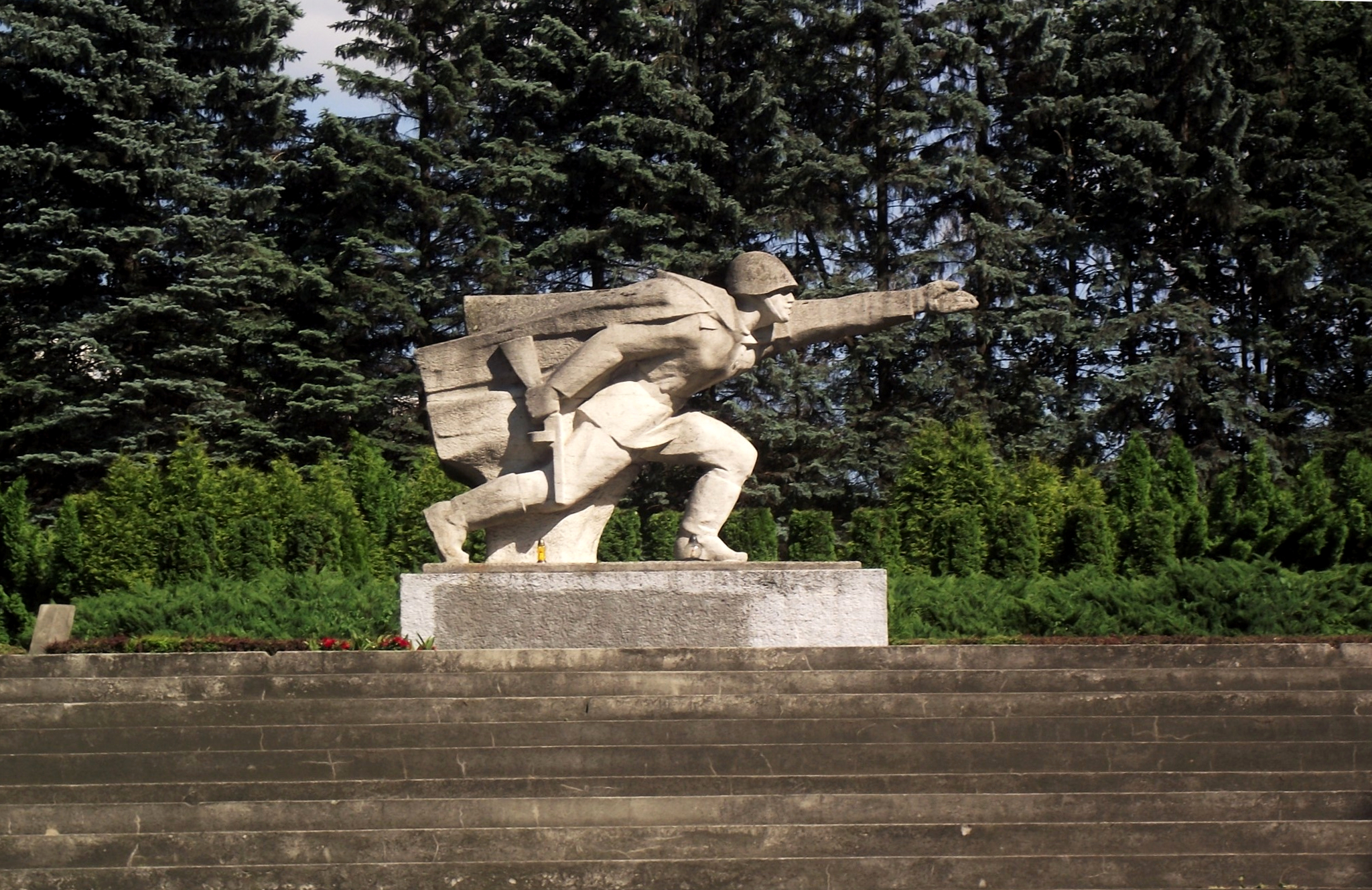
Monument of Soviet soldier

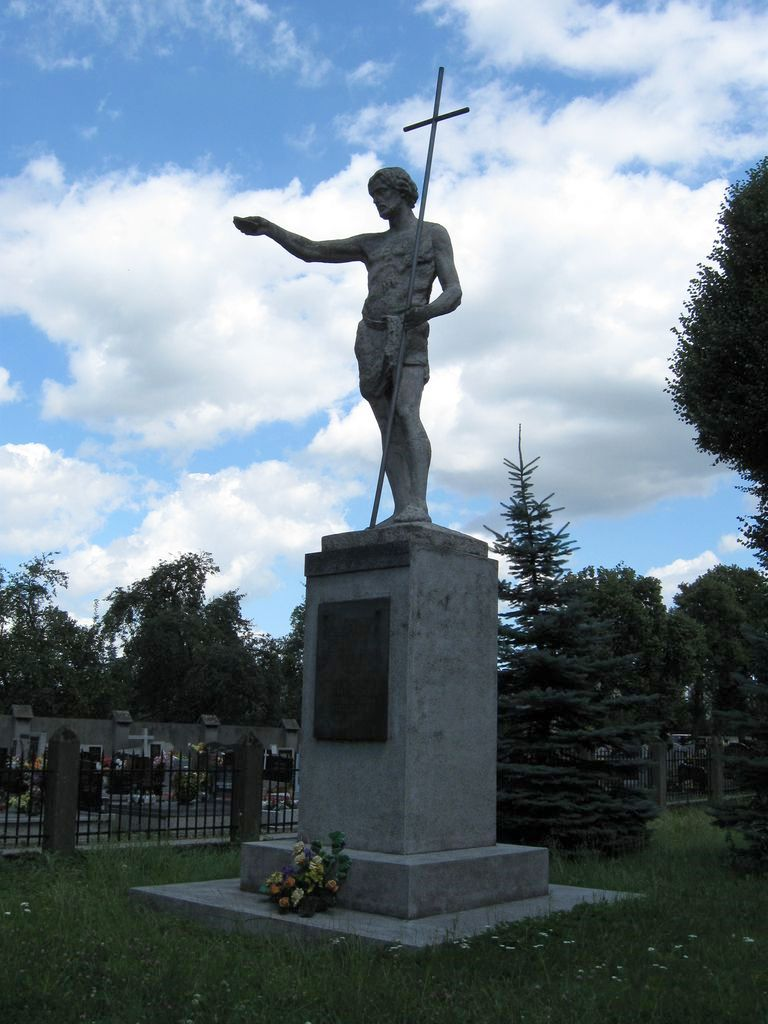
John the Baptist
