= Julia Keilowa =

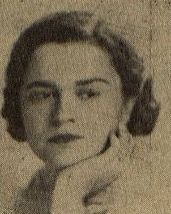
- Born: Julia Ringel; 1902; Stryj, Austrian Poland
- Died: 1943 (aged 40–41); Warsaw, Poland
- Known for: Design, sculpture
- Movement: Art Deco
- Spouse: Ignacy Keil (m. 1922)

Julia Keilowa (née Ringel; 1902 – 1943) was a Polish artist industrial designer.

== Early life ==
She came from an assimilated Jewish family, attending schools in both Lviv and Vienna. She studied model manufacture at the Lviv National Industrial School. In 1922 she married lawyer Ignacy Keil. She continued art studies at the Academy of Fine Arts in Warsaw. Her teachers included Karol Tichy, Wojciech Jastrzębowski, Józef Czajkowski and Tadeusz Breyer. During her studies she worked mainly with sculpture. In 1929 she became a member of the sculpting cooperative „Forma”. She exhibited at the Art Promotion Institute.

== Designer ==
In 1933 she established her own metalwork workshop. She designed around 400 usable objects, mainly plated objects. Warsaw factories produced her cutlery and crockery, including Norblin, Fraget and Henneberg Brothers. During Second World War for two years she led a ceramic workshop. She died most probably at Pawiak.

In autumn 2012 an exhibition of her works took place in Copper Museum in Legnica.

In October 2015, a major exhibition in Instytut Sztuki Polskiej Akademii Nauk focused solely on Keilowa's work.

== Death ==
Little is known about circumstances of her death; it is likely she died in the German-run Pawiak prison in 1943 during The Holocaust in Poland.
