= Cinema Museum (Girona) =

Museum of Cinema-Tomàs Mallol collection
- Museu del Cinema-Col·lecció Tomàs Mallol
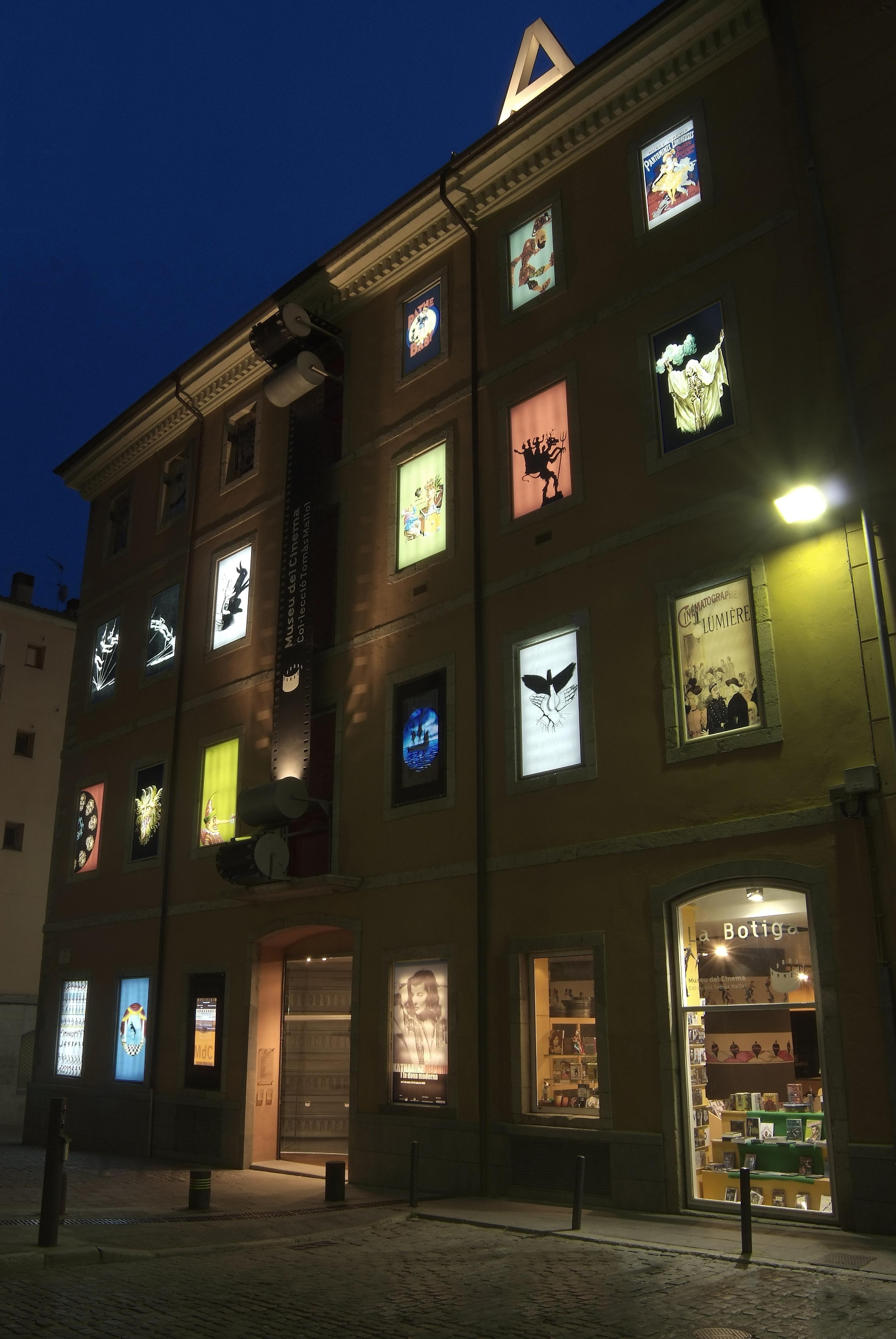

- Location within Catalonia
- Established: 08-04-1998
- Location: Pl. Mercadal C, de la Séquia, 1 Girona
- Coordinates: 41°59′01″N 2°49′20″E
- Type: Cinema Museum
- Visitors: 870,000 (1998-2011)
- Website: www.museudelcinema.cat/eng/index.php

The Cinema Museum - Tomàs Mallol Collection is a museum dedicated to the world of film and moving images.

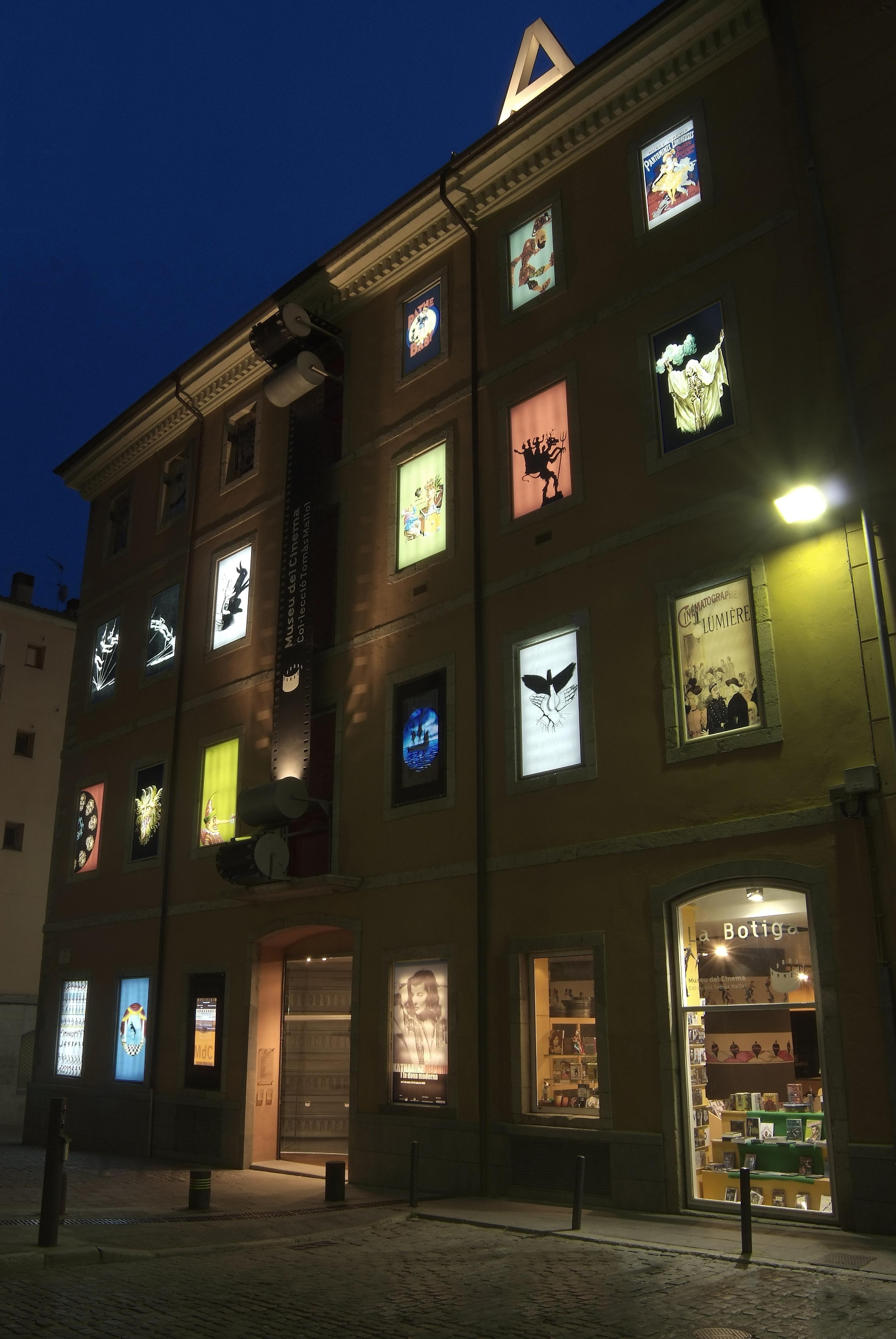
Cinema Museum facade

It was created in the city of Girona (Catalonia) from the Tomàs Mallol Collection of pre-cinema and cinema objects, which was acquired in 1994 by the City Council of Girona. The museum was inaugurated on April 8, 1998, the first of its kind in Spain, which hosts a variety of material of cinema and precinema.

Besides the permanent exhibition displays the Tomàs Mallol Collection, a journey through 400 years of the history of the moving image. The Cinema Museum also has an active educational service with educational activities about cinema and the moving image, an extensive program of activities and temporary exhibitions, an Institute of Studies (with library service, video library and archive), a club of friends of the museum and the Museum Shop.

The Cinema Museum has received several awards and honors, which include a finalist nomination in the "European Museum of the Year Award" (2000), the Gonzalez Sinde Prize (2003) awarded by the Academy of Motion Pictures Arts and Sciences from Spain, and in 2006 the National Heritage Award, given by the Government of Catalonia. Finally, in 2010 was awarded the Martha Mata Education Prize, awarded by the Association Rosa Sensat Teachers.

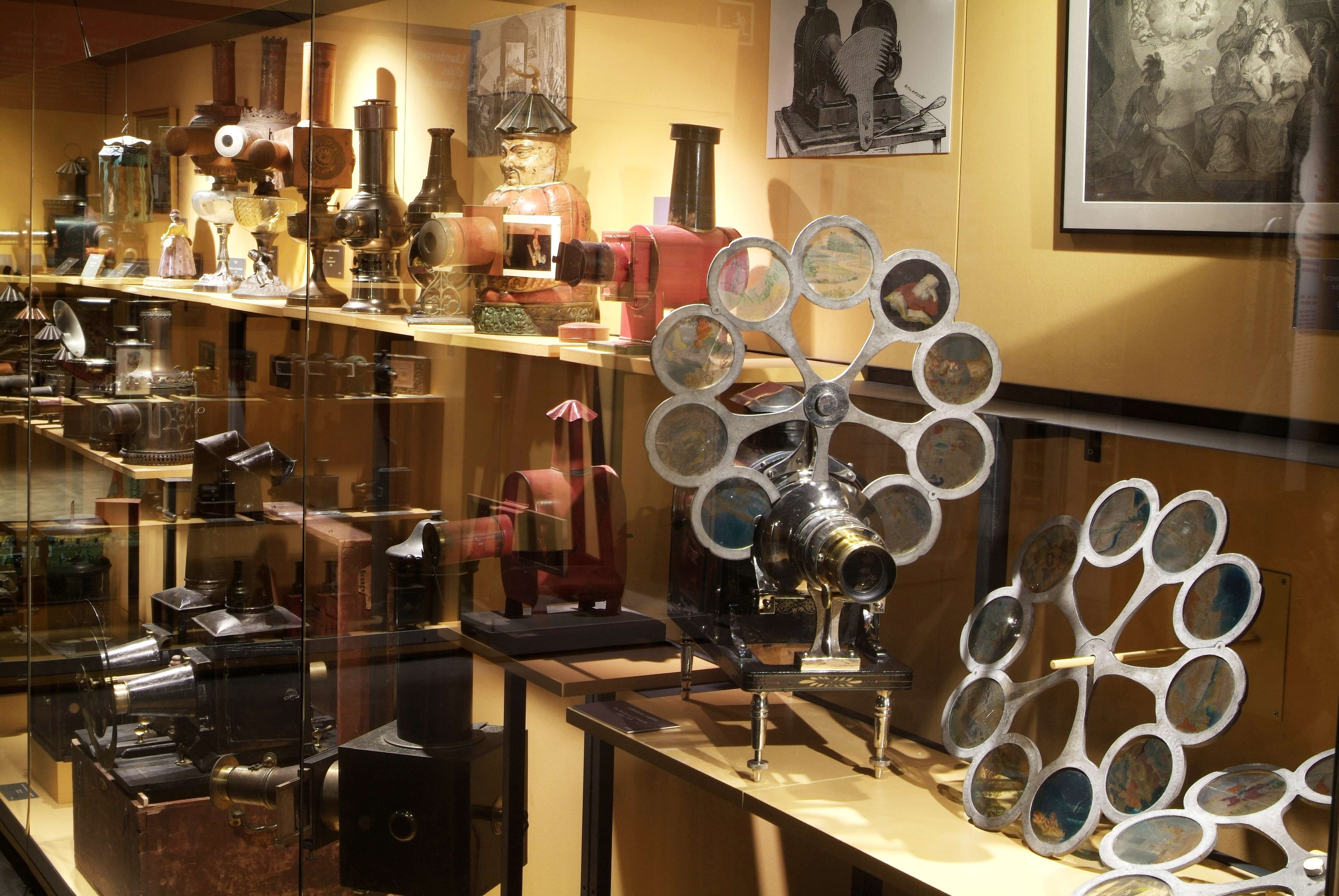
Cinema Museum in Girona. Photo: J.M. Oliveras

== Origin ==
On April 8, 1998, the Museu de Cinema – Col•lecció Tomàs Mallol was opened in the city of Girona. This museum is unique in its field in Spain and one of the few of its kind in Europe. The origin of the Museu de Cinema must be found in the labour of Tomàs Mallol (born in Sant Pere Pescador, Catalonia, in 1923), in his passion for art and especially cinema technique, which arose in him at an early age with open-air projections in the main square of his home town. An amateur filmmaker, from 1956 to 1977 Tomàs Mallol made 31 short films, some of which won awards in Spain and Internationally in the middle of the 1960s, he began to collect various cinema instruments that would later become the nucleus of his collection. This was also the time he began his intense activity of researching and see¬king out objects of interest. This would lead him over a period of more than 30 years to build a collection related to pre-cinema and cinema from the earliest years that is now recognized as the most important in Spain and one of the most outstanding in Europe. In January, 1994, the City of Girona acquired this collection with the goal of making it into the foundation of the Museu de Cinema - Col•lecció Tomàs Mallol, which is located in a three-floor building of almost 3000 square metres that is found in the centre of Girona.

== Tomàs Mallol Collection ==
Currently the Tomàs Mallol Collection is made up of approximately 12,000 pieces, including instruments, accessories, photographs, engravings and paintings, along with 2000 posters and film publicity material, 800 books and magazines and 750 films in all formats. These objects can be set into a chronological period that runs from the seventeenth century to 1970. The collection features important objects from the history of pre-cinema and early cinema that are absolutely unique. Yet what really makes it exceptional is that it allows us to follow and understand the history of images and the evolution of audiovisual spectacles step by step, from Chinese shadow theatre puppets to the first years of cinema

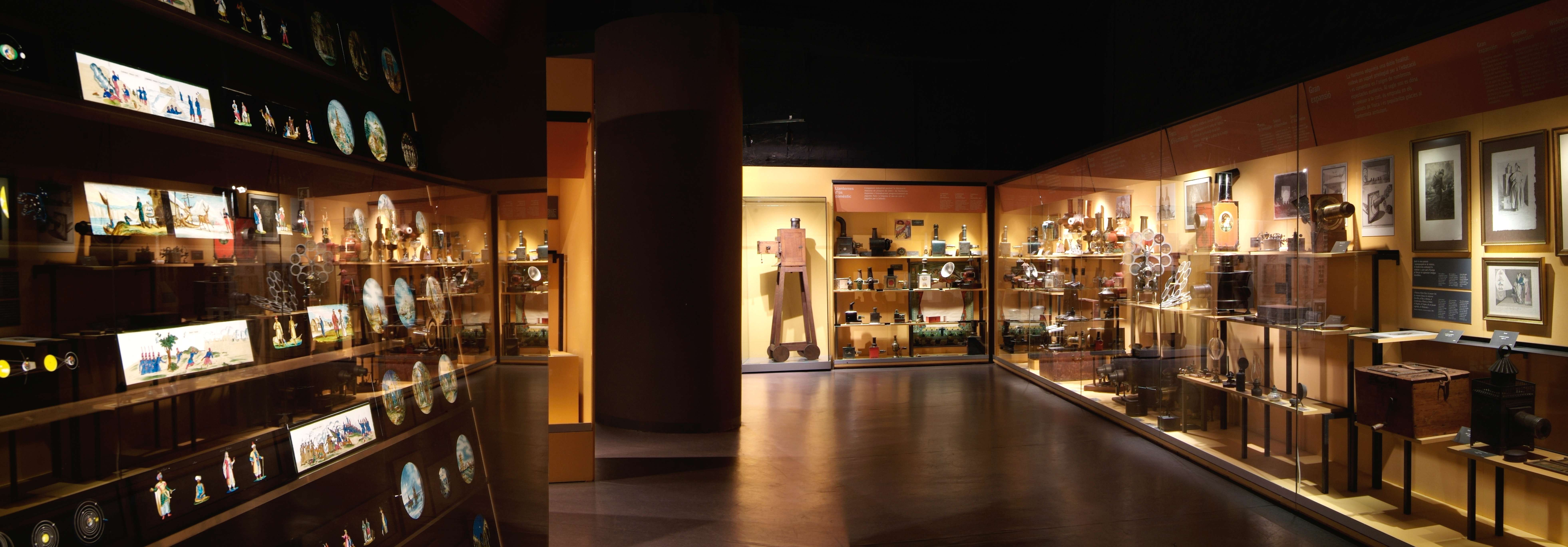
Permanent exhibition. Cinema Museum in Girona. Photo: J.M. Oliveras

== Permanent Exhibition ==
The visit through the 1500 square metres of exhibition space begins on the lower floor, with an audiovisual display that works as a prologue. The background voice of a generic spectator tells us how over time he has always been surprised and fascinated by the multitude of visual spectacles that have taken place, each with different techni¬ques, increasingly complex. It then invites visitors, spectators like him, to enter into the permanent exhibition, where they will embark on a journey through 400 years of the history of images and relive the emotions that our ancestors experienced in viewing them.

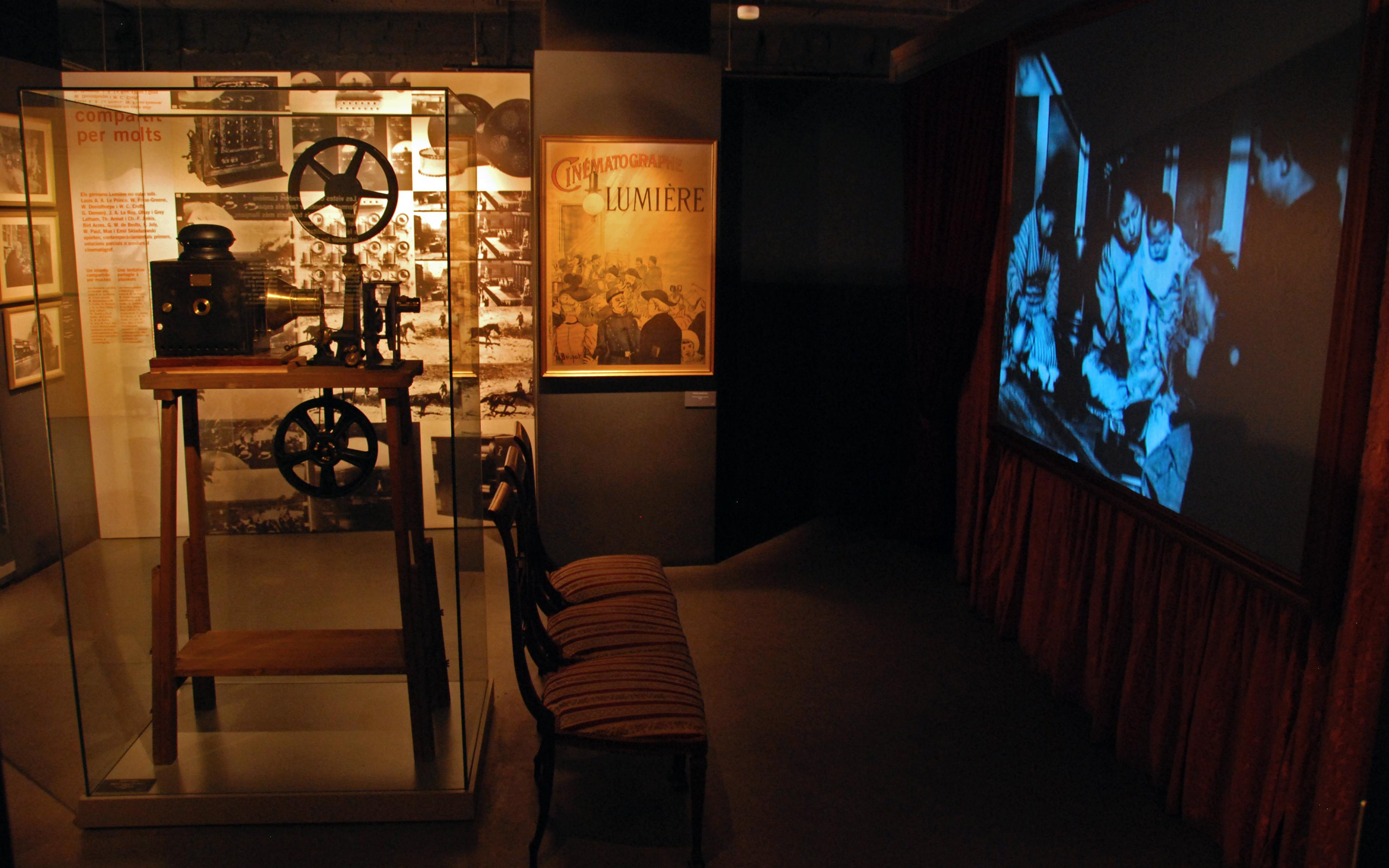
Cinema Museum in Girona. Photo: J.M. Oliveras

The first section, on the third floor, is dedicated to Chinese shadow theatre puppets, an art with ancestral origins: for the first time light, darkness and the screen were used to create the spectacle. Next, in the interior of a room without light the camera obscura allows us to see the reflection of the exterior images of the world, and understand why this phenomenon is the basis on which the technique of photography and cinema is founded. The next section is dedicated to mirrors, which allowed us to capture ephemeral images of the world generating optical games that drew the attention of science and the esoteric interests of the past Following on this, we observe one of the essential sections of the museum, dedicated to the magic lantern. Two hundred years before the invention of cinema, the magic lantern converted the projection of images into a form of mass entertainment for the first time, providing information and serving as an educational tool. The magic lantern is the clearest precedent of cinema both as technique and as spectacle. In the seventeenth and eighteenth centuries, instruments were built to enable the human hand to fix the images captured by the camera obscura. The exhibition shows what these tools were, the resulting images and how they could be observed by means of peep show or the Mondo Nuovo, a travelling show that introduced viewers to far-off cities and landscapes without leaving their homes. Afterwards, the visitor can see how photography was able to reproduce precise images of reality, thanks to advances in chemistry and the camera obscura. Now on the second floor, the exhibition continues with instruments based on the principle of the persistence of vision that began to generate the illusion of moving Images, even though they were simply drawings that were animated through repetitive movements After this, we enter into the section dedicated to the definitive path towards cinema as we know it, when in the twenty years preceding its invention scientists the world over began an increasingly accelerated race towards the discovery of the projection of photographic images in movement. Finally, the visitor comes to a space that refers to the historical moment itself, on December 28, 1895. On that day, in the Salon Indien, found in the cellar of the Grand Café in Paris, the Lumière brothers offe¬red the first paid public projection with an instrument of their own invention the cinematograph. From that moment onwards we move into the first years of cinema, beginning with the magician Georges Méliès, who discovered its illusory possibilities through the introduction of image manipulation. The section also looks at the rapid spread of cinema throughout the world, its technological evolution, how it began to create its own language until becoming a new art and a new industry, and, finally, how starting with the 1930s it would be faced with a competitor: television. At the end of this space, one audiovisual presentation invites us to contemplate representative ima¬ges of 100 years of cinema, while another looks at the way a film is made in our day. On the first floor, at the end of the visit, we find two examples of how the magic of cinema pertains to amateurs and children as well. Instruments related to amateur film from the early period and to children's cinema, especially with the popular Cine NIC, are shown in these final metres of the permanent exhibition The exhibition concept is not limited to merely setting out the most important parts of the Tomàs Mallol Collection (with nearly 1500 objects on display). It also seeks to work as an Interactive display that is friendly and educational. For this reason, various audiovisual and theatrical projections are set into the visit (giving us an idea of what early visual spectacles were like), along with replicas of the objects shown so that visitors can handle them, understand how they once worked and see the images they would produce. All told this ensures that the exhibition, through the themes it deals with and the way it is presented, is ideal for all kinds of visitors, regardless of age, educational level, nationality, cultural background, language or interest in cinema. It is a universal discourse allowing everyone to enjoy this world of images.

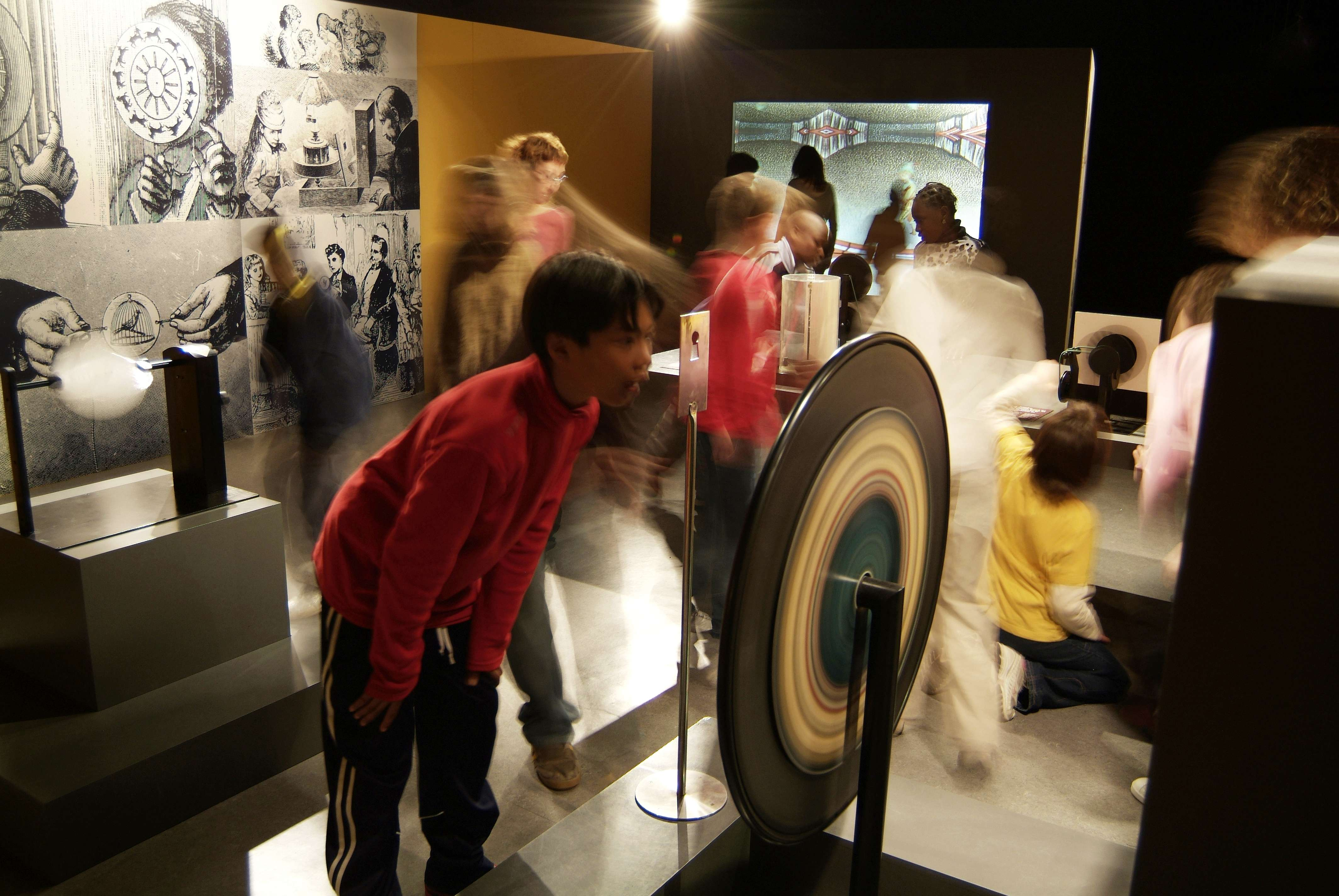
Educational service. Cinema Museum in Girona. Photo: J.M. Oliveras

== Objectives and services ==
Nevertheless, the global objective of the Museu de Cinema goes beyond the permanent display of the Tomas Mallol Collection. Its aim is to encourage wider knowledge, learning and research in the field of cinema and of images in general. So as to achieve this goal the museum has various services directed to its potential users, including an ongoing programming of temporary exhibitions and activities, an educational service with a generous program of visits, workshops and film-related activities for schools, the Institut d'Estudis (research institute) with its specialized library, videotheque and consultation service related to the museum's holdings, the friends of the museum, called the Club de Actors, and the museum shop, amongst others. Now that cinema has entered into the second century of its life, the Museu de Cinema presents itself as an homage to all those men and women who, through their efforts and creativity, made it possible to fascinate audiences by means of moving ima¬ges. The Museu is also there in support of the future of audiovisual communication media, whose development is in constant evolution.
