= Jeremi Kubicki =

Polish painter

- Born: 6 April 1911; Łódź, Russian Empire
- Died: 6 December 1938 (aged 27); Warsaw, Poland
- Occupation: Painter

Jeremi Kubicki (6 April 1911 – 6 December 1938) was a Polish painter. His work was part of the art competitions at the 1932 Summer Olympics and the 1936 Summer Olympics. He committed suicide at 27 years of age by shooting himself in 1938.

== Gallery ==
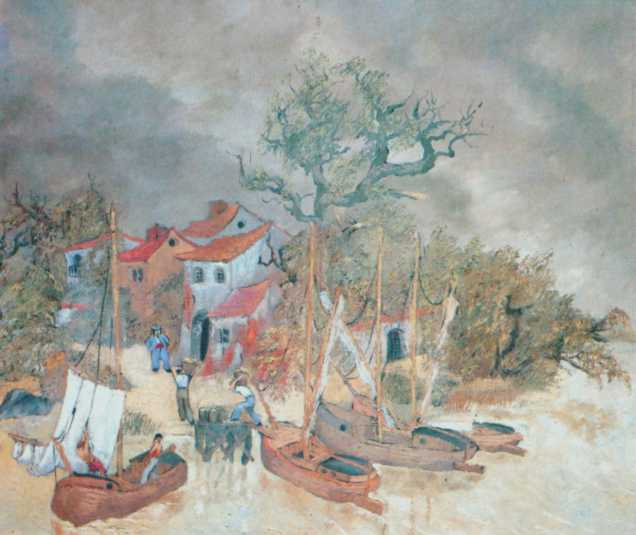
Landscape with Boats (1926)

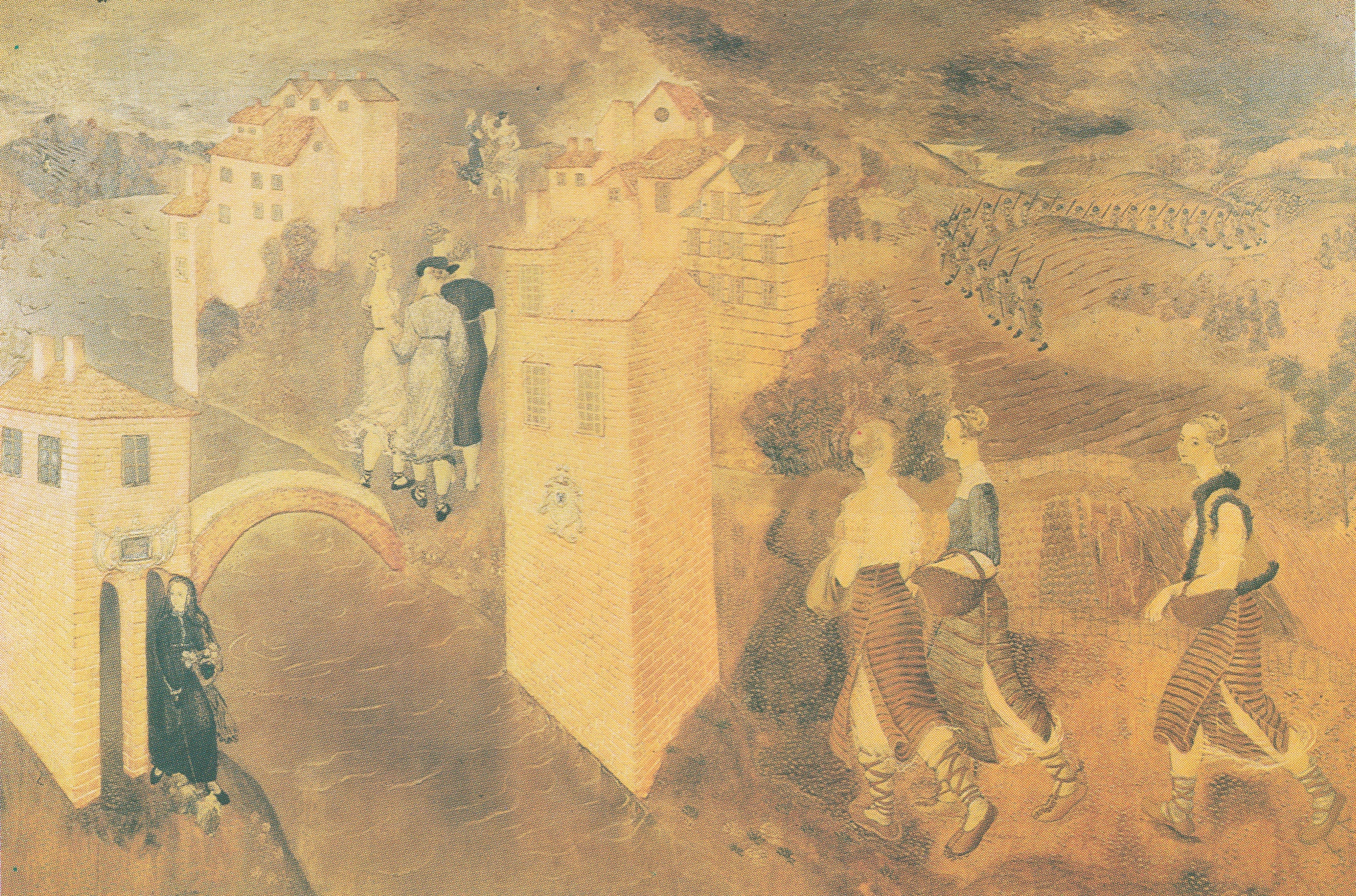
Manoeuvres (1930)

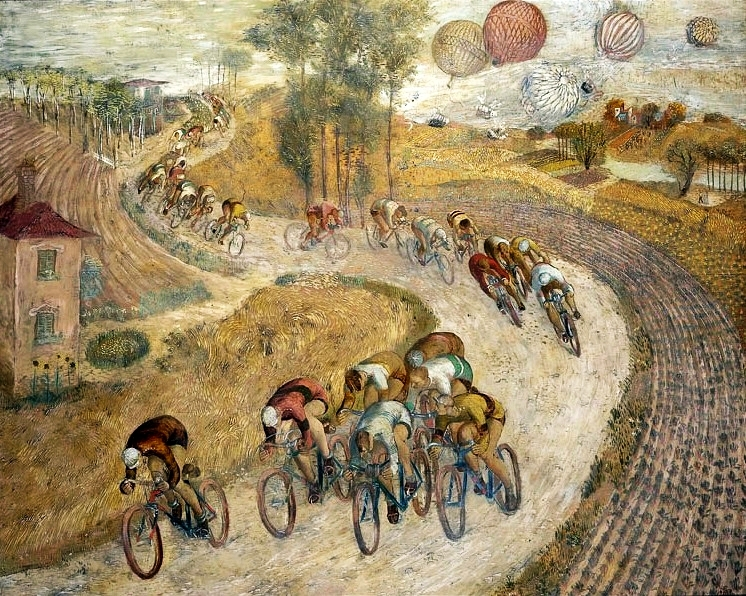
Cyclists (1935)
