= MOMus–Thessaloniki Museum of Photography =

Museum in Greece

Coordinates: 40°37′58.62″N 22°56′7.68″E

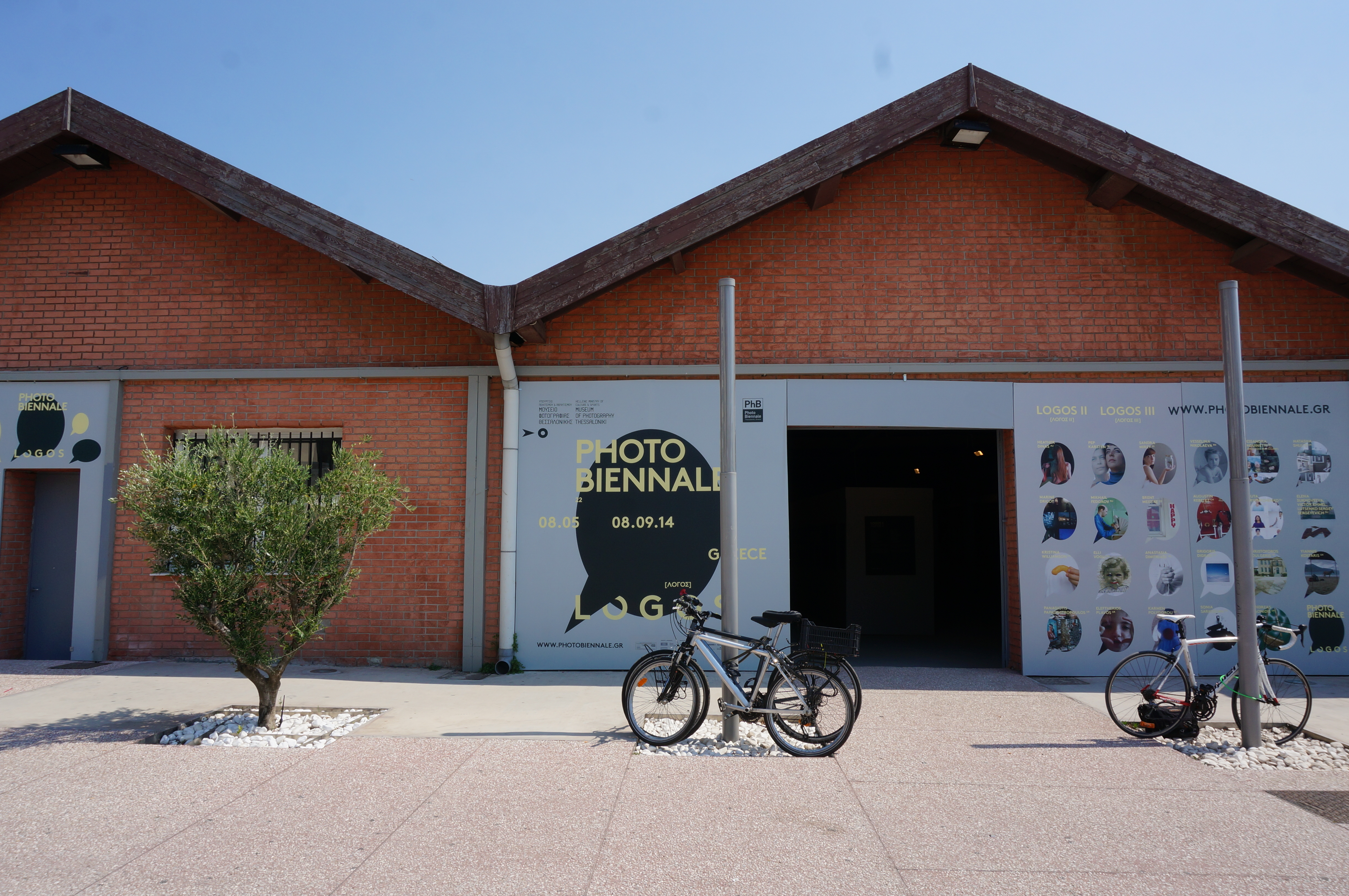
External view.

MOMus Photography, in full MOMus–Thessaloniki Museum of Photography, is located in Thessaloniki, Central Macedonia, Greece. It is currently housed in Warehouse A, Pier A, at the Port of Thessaloniki, next to the Cinema Museum of Thessaloniki. It was formerly known as the Thessaloniki Museum of Photography (Greek: Μουσείο Φωτογραφίας Θεσσαλονίκης).

The museum was founded in 1987 by Aris Georgiou, Apostolos Maroulis and Yiannis Vanidis, but it was not until 1997 that it was legally established and until 1998 that it opened with Giorgos Makris as its president and Aris Georgiou as its first director.

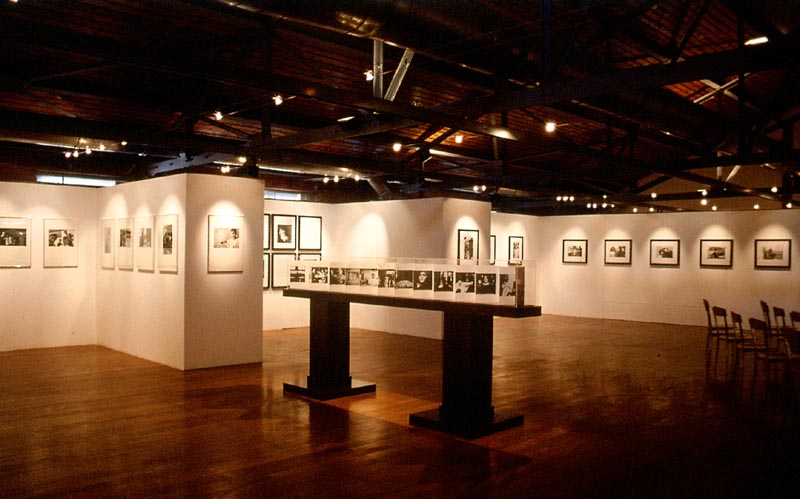
An interior view.

Since 1999, the museum has collaborated with a host of Greek and international bodies to undertake the organization of Photo Synkyria, the country's most important and longest-lasting photographic institution.
