= Cinema Museum of Thessaloniki =

Cinema museum in Thessaloniki, Greece

Coordinates: 40.6329°N 22.9355°E

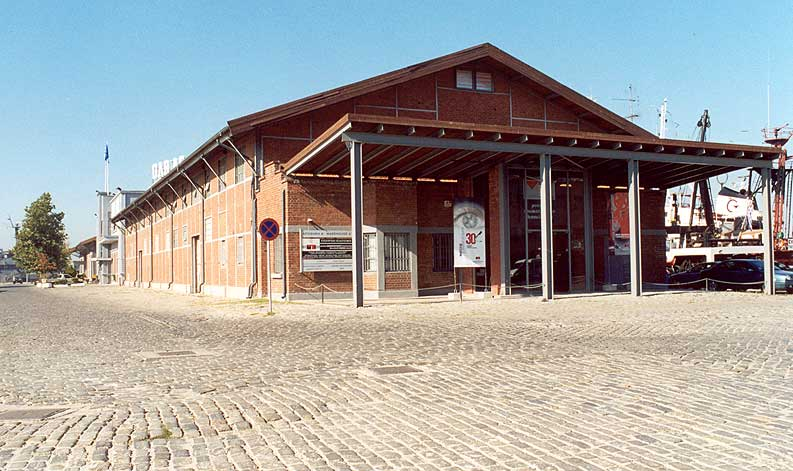
External view

The Cinema Museum of Thessaloniki is a museum in Thessaloniki, Central Macedonia, Greece. It was founded in 1995 following a decision by the Organization for Thessaloniki, Cultural Capital of Europe 1997. Today it is part of the Thessaloniki Film Festival with its own management committee. It is housed in Warehouse 1, a listed building on quay 1 in the harbour, at the end of the old sea front near Aristotelous Square.

The museum's mission is to gather, preserve and display as museum exhibits items from the life of the cinema in Greece. Setting up the museum became feasible following the purchase of the cinematography collection of the Thessaloniki cinematographer Nikos Bililis.

Exhibits include machinery, i.e. cine-cameras and projectors, old pieces of cinema equipment and attachments, cinema-film developing tanks, lenses, sub-titling machines etc., celluloid material (films, news reels etc.), photographs from almost two thousand films, gigantic, hand-produced cinema posters, the musical background to all cinema films circulated prior to 1995 on LPs and CDs, and a cinema archive.

In the cinema archive visitors and researchers alike can find information about the cinema in Greece from 1985 and on. This includes information about film festivals, public showings of films in Greek cinemas, and biographical data on directors and actors etc. Similar work covering the period from 1926 to 1985 is now approaching completion.

The museum provides organized tours and shows excerpts of films in a room specially designed for this purpose.

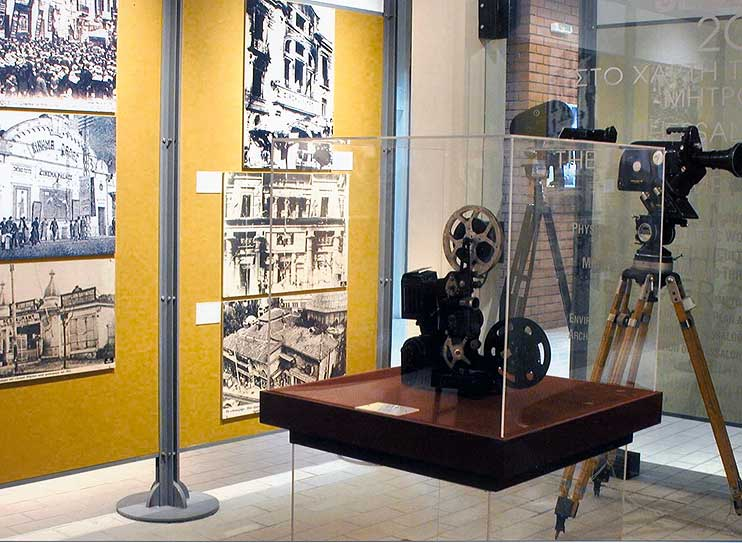
Projection Machine

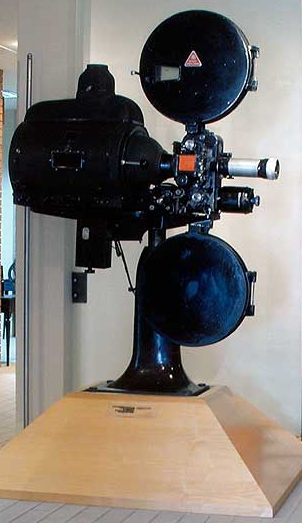
Projection Machines

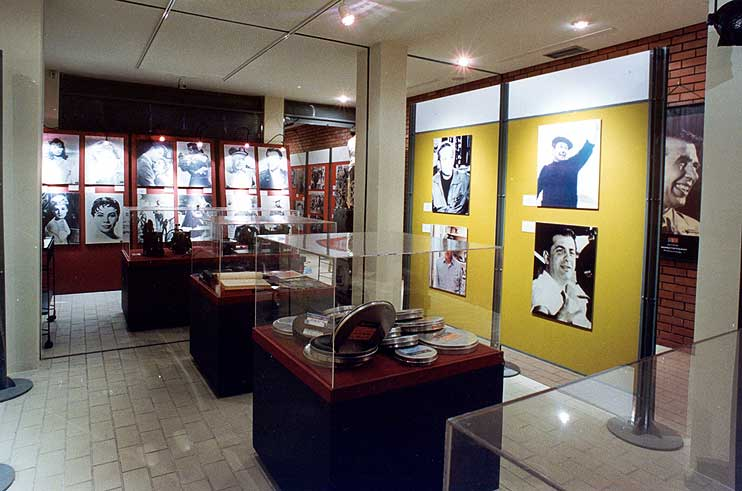
Internal View 1

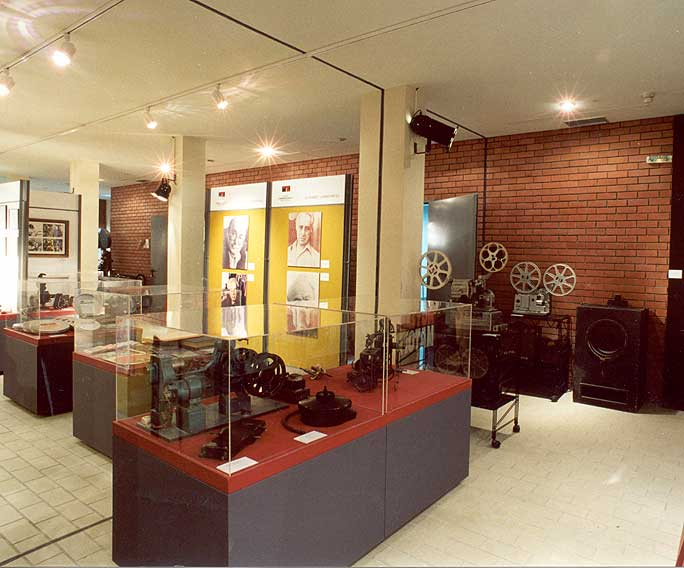
Internal View 2

== Sources ==
- This article incorporates text from the corresponding article at the Museums of Macedonia website, commissioned by the Macedonian Heritage foundation, written by Vlasis Vlasidis, and published under a CC-BY-SA-3.0 license.
