= Obieg =

Polish magazine about contemporary art

- Editor: Piotr Bernatowicz
- Former editors: Piotr Rypson, Grzegorz Borkowski, Adam Mazur, Krzysztof Gutfrański
- Categories: art magazine
- Frequency: quarterly
- Circulation: online
- Publisher: U-Jazdowski Castle (Centrum Sztuki Współczesnej Zamek Ujazdowski)
- Founded: 1987
- Country: Poland
- Based in: Warsaw
- Language: Polish
- Website: obieg.u-jazdowski.pl
- ISSN: 1732-9795

Obieg is a Polish magazine about contemporary art, published by the Centre for Contemporary Art Ujazdowski Castle. The magazine's first issue was in 1987. In 1994 the final, 65th monthly issue of the magazine was published. In 2004, it resumed publishing on a quarterly basis.

The magazine moved online. The magazine's editor-in-chief is Piotr Bernatowicz
