= Józef Mroszczak =

Polish graphic designer

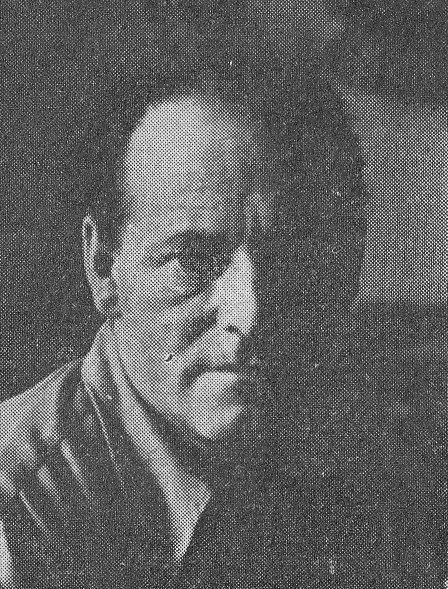
- Born: 11 May 1910; Nowy Targ, Poland
- Died: 19 September 1975 (aged 65); Warsaw, Poland
- Occupation: Graphic designer
- Children: Marcin Mroszczak

Józef Mroszczak (11 May 1910 – 19 September 1975) was a Polish graphic designer at the forefront of the Polish School of Posters. Beyond his creative practice, he undertook a pivotal role in organising how graphic design was taught and publicised throughout the country. He contributed significantly to the professionalisation of graphic design in Poland, and the international acclaim that was garnered by its conceptual poster movement.

Retaining a balance between design and artistic expressiveness, Mroszczak's works were widely exhibited and frequently awarded. For over two decades he lectured at the Academy of Fine Arts in Warsaw alongside pre-eminent poster designer Henryk Tomaszewski. In 1956 Mroszczak co-founded the influential bi-monthly magazine, Projekt, which showcased visual art and design. A decade later he established the International Poster Biennale in Warsaw, and sought the creation of the Poster Museum in Wilanów. Through his practice and professional associations, Józef Mroszczak brought about wider recognition of the Polish poster movement.

== Early life and education ==
Mroszczak was born on 11 May 1910 in Nowy Targ, Poland. After graduating from high school in his hometown in 1928, he studied at Kraków's School of Decorative Arts and Art Industry (1930–1933), and then at the Kunstgewerbeschule and the Graphische Lehr- und Versuchtanstalt in Vienna's Academy of Graphic Arts (1934–1937).

== Career ==
When he completed his higher education he settled in Katowice, where he taught at the city's Trade High School from 1936 to 1937. Mroszczak was one of the founders of Katowice's Free School of Painting and Drawing, where he ran a graphic arts studio between 1937 and 1939, while at the same time conducting courses at the Institute of Commercial Education in Chorzów. From 1938, he lectured on the theory of advertising at the College of Administration and Social Studies in Katowice. During the German occupation of Poland he taught courses on drawing and lettering at the Trade High School in Zakopane and at the Nowy Targ School of Economics. Once World War II had ended, Mroszczak set about organising the artistic life throughout Silesia. He co-founded of the Polish Artists' Association (ZPAP), assuming the chairmanship of its regional office. From 1947 to 1953, he lectured at the Katowice School of Art, which was later transformed into the Second Faculty of Graphic Art at Kraków's Academy of Fine Arts. In addition, his skills were employed in designing stands for the Polish coal industry at various international fairs.

Moving to Warsaw in 1952, Mroszczak became the creative director at the publishing house Wydawnictwo Artystyczno-Graficzne (WAG) (1952–1956) and secured a lectureship at the city's Academy of Fine Arts. He became Chair of Graphic Design from 1957 to 1960, and Dean of the School of Graphic Arts from 1968 to 1971. Having been an associate professor from 1956, his position as full professor was secured in 1971.

Mroszczak also lectured at numerous foreign universities. Among them were Akademie für Bildende Kunst in Berlin-Weissensee (1958) and Hochschule der Künste in West Berlin (1964). In 1963 he lectured at Vienna's Akademie für Angewandte Kunst, and in 1964 he was invited to give a series of lectures at the Folkwangeschule in Essen. He gave a presentation at the Fachbereich Architektur Technische Universität Darmstadt, and he conducted a seminar at the Hochschule für Gestaltung in Ulm. In 1965 he lectured at the Linz Kunstschule, and in 1966 he participated in a conference for visual communication organised at the German Universität zu Köln. He was invited to conduct a course for graphic designers at the Centre for Creative Enterprise near Moscow in 1968. He lectured at the German Westfälische Wilhelms-Universität Münster, at the Association of Russian Artists in Moscow, and lectured on teaching graphic design in Vienna and Linz in 1974.

Mroszczak co-founded the periodical Projekt (Design) and was its editor from 1956 to 1966. He was Vice Chairman of ZPAP's Chief Artistic Committee, and was co-founder and Chairman of the Warsaw International Poster Biennial Organizational Committee from 1966 up to his death in 1975. He was a member of the Committee for Packaging, the Council for Culture and Artistic Higher Education at the Art and Culture Ministry, and the Fine Arts Council. He served as Chairman of the Artistic Committee of the Wilanów Poster Museum, and was both Presidium Member of the Prime Minister's Council on Industrial Aesthetics and Design, and Chairman of the Fine Arts Section of the State Awards Committee.

A representative of the Polish School of Posters, his interests included poster design, the art of exhibition, and functional graphic design. He designed pavilions at various international expositions and fairs, including Poznań, Paris, Milan, Barcelona, Leipzig, Stockholm, Helsinki, İzmir, Bari, Brussels, and Vienna. He was Chief Designer of the Polish Industry Exhibition in Moscow in 1959; and in 1961 he co-designed the Polish pavilion at the international work safety exposition "Italia '61" in Turin.

Mroszczak became a member of Alliance Graphique Internationale (AGI) in 1950 and served as chairman of the organization's Polish Section from 1966 to 1974. He served as Vice Chairman of ICOGRADA 1968–1970, was an honorary member of the Dutch Graphic Artists Association (GVN), and of the Accademia di Belle Arti in Parma.

Mroszczak died in Warsaw on 19 September 1975, at the age of 65.

== Honours ==
- 1947 – Golden Cross of Democratic Hungary
- 1952 – Golden Cross of Merit
- 1955 – Officer's Cross of the Order of Polonia Restituta
- 1959 – Commander's Cross of the Order of Polonia Restituta

== Solo exhibitions ==
- 1962 – Katowice
- 1964 – Vienna, Galerie in der Biberstrasse
- 1968 – London
- 1971 – Essen, Deutsches Plakat Museum
- 1972 – West Berlin, Galerie Warschau
- 1972 – Moscow
- 1973 – Leningrad
- 1973 – Warsaw, Dom Artysty Plastyka
- 1976 – Warsaw, Galeria Zapiecek (posthumous)
- 1978 – Essen, Deutsches Plakat Museum
- 1985 – Warsaw, Kordegarda (tenth anniversary of the artist's death)
- 1990 – Warsaw, Galeria TPSP "Stara Kordegarda" (80th anniversary of the artist's birth)
- 1993 – Nowy Targ, Galeria "Jatki"
- 1996 – Warsaw, Academy of Fine Arts

== Prizes and awards ==
- 1950 – Katowice City Award,
- 1950 – 3rd Prize for graphic art at the "Plastyka w obronie Pokoju" ("Art in Defense of Peace") salon
- 1951 – 2nd Prize at the "Plastyka w obronie Pokoju" salon for the poster "Peace"
- 1952 – 2nd Prize at the "Kongres Narodów w Obronie Pokoju" ("Congress of Nations in Defense of Peace") competition
- 1953 – 2nd Prize (joint) at the 1st Polish National Poster Exposition, Warsaw (To my homeland I pledge, 22 July 1953, Peace – Happiness for Our Children)
- 1953 – State Award of the 3rd order,
- 1955 – 2nd Prize (joint) at the 2nd Polish National Poster and Illustration Exposition, Warsaw (National Front, Christopher Columbus, Flowers of the People's Republic)
- 1956 – CUK Prize for achievements in film posters at the Film Poster Exhibition, Warsaw
- 1961 – 2nd Prize, Poster Exhibition "Polskie Dzieło Plastyczne w XV-lecie PRL" ("Polish Artistic Endeavour after 15 years of the People's Republic of Poland"), Warsaw
- 1961 – Monthly award (June) in "Best Varsovian Poster" competition (Exhibition of Greek Photography)
- 1962 – Monthly award (February) in "Best Varsovian Poster" competition (Cepelia - kilim)
- 1964 – Monthly award (January) and the annual award in "Best Varsovian Poster" competition (Don Carlos)
- 1964 – First Order Award from the Ministry of Culture and Art Award
- 1965 – Gold medal (collective), International Exhibition of Book Art (IBA), Leipzig
- 1966 - Monthly award (January) and the annual award in "Best Varsovian Poster" competition (Polish Culture Congress)
- 1966 – Monthly award (December) in "Best Varsovian Poster" competition (The Gipsy Baron)
- 1966 – Prize at the 2nd International Functional Graphics Biennial, Brno
- 1966 – Prize sponsored by the Minister of Defense at the 1st International Poster Biennial, Warsaw, (Auschwitz never again project)
- 1967 - Monthly award (September) and the annual award in "Best Varsovian Poster" competition (The Icon in Poland and its Transformations)
- 1968 – State Award of the 2nd order
- 1968 – Monthly award (June) in "Best Varsovian Poster" competition (Wilanów Poster Museum)
- 1968 – Association of Swiss Graphic Artists’ (VSG) Prize "Prisma", Zurich, for popularizing the poster around the world
- 1969 – Prize sponsored by the ZPAP Regional Office in Katowice at the 3rd Polish National Poster Biennial, Katowice (Wilanów Poster Museum)
- 1970 – Monthly award (June) in "Best Varsovian Poster" competition (3rd International Poster Biennial)
- 1970 – Ministry of Culture and Art Award for achievements in organization of the didactic process
- 1970 – Award from the Council of Industrial Aesthetics and Design
- 1971 – Monthly award (June) in "Best Varsovian Poster" competition (Word and Image)
- 1971 – “Problems for Peace and Socialism” Editors’ First Prize, International Political Poster Competition, Prague
- 1972 – Monthly award (December) in "Best Varsovian Poster" competition (Soviet Poster)
- 1972 – Jury prize at the 4th International Poster Biennial, Warsaw (for a three poster set)
- 1972 – Prize sponsored by "Życie Warszawy" at the 4th International Poster Biennial, Warsaw (Works by Judges of the 4th IPB)
- 1972 – 1st Prize at the 4th Polish National Review of Museum and Conservation Posters, Przemyśl (Word and Image)
- 1974 – Foreign Ministry's Certificate of Recognition for outstanding service in the promotion of Polish culture abroad
- 1974 – Prize in the "Problems for Peace and Socialism" magazine competition, Moscow (Work, Happiness, Peace, Freedom, Progress)
- 1974 – Gold Medal at the 6th Biennial of Functional Graphics, Brno (Word and Image)
- 1974 – One of two joint first prizes in the "Turystyka w wycieczce łączonej krajów demokracji ludowej" ("Tourism in the joint tour of people’s democratic republics") competition
- 1975 – UNESCO Prize in the "Habitat" poster competition, Paris

== Texts and publications by Józef Mroszczak ==
- O liternictwie, Głos Plastyków 1937, 1–7, p. 126
- Wiedeńska wystawa plakatów, Odrodzenie 1948/45
- O dalszy wzrost poziomu ideowo-artystycznego plakatu polskiego. In: O plakacie. Zbiór materiałów (..), WAG, Warsaw 1953
- O dalszy wzrost poziomu ideowo-artystystycznego plakatu polskiego, Przegląd Artystyczny 1953/3
- [preface in:] Vystava polsky plakat [cat.], Prague 1954
- Tadeusz Trepkowski, Życie Warszawy 1955/5
- [preface in:] An Exhibition of Polish Posters [cat.], Washington 1955
- [preface in:] (International Caricature Exhibition) [cat.], Vienna 1955
- [preface in:] Polnische Plakate [cat.], Norymberga 1956
- [preface in:] Polnisches Plakat, Ausstellung [cat.], West Berlin 1957
- [preface in:] Cartazes poloneses, [cat.] Rio de Janeiro 1959
- [preface in:] Polish Poster, Exhibition (...) [cat.], Ottawa 1960
- [preface in:] L'Exposition d'affiches polonaises [cat.], Beirut 1961
- Polnische Plakatkunst, Econ Verlag, Wien - Düsseldorf 1962
- [preface in:] I Międzynarodowe Biennale Plakatu [cat.], Warsaw 1966
- I Międzynarodowe Biennale Plakatu, WAG, Warsaw 1968
- [preface in:] II Międzynarodowe Biennale Plakatu [cat.], Warsaw 1968
- Uwagi o sztuce, Kultura 1978/41
