= List of Polish graphic designers =

== Polish graphic designers ==
- Roman Cieślewicz
- Stasys Eidrigevicius
- Jan Lenica
- Jan Mlodozeniec
- Adam Niklewicz
- Wiesław Rosocha
- Wiktor Sadowski
- Jan Sawka
- Franciszek Starowieyski
- Piotr Szyhalski
- Henryk Tomaszewski
- Jurek Wajdowicz
- Wiesław Wałkuski
- Mieczysław Wasilewski

== See also ==
- Polish School of Posters
- List of graphic designers
- List of Polish painters
- Graphic design
