= Polish School of Posters =

Art movement originating in postwar Poland

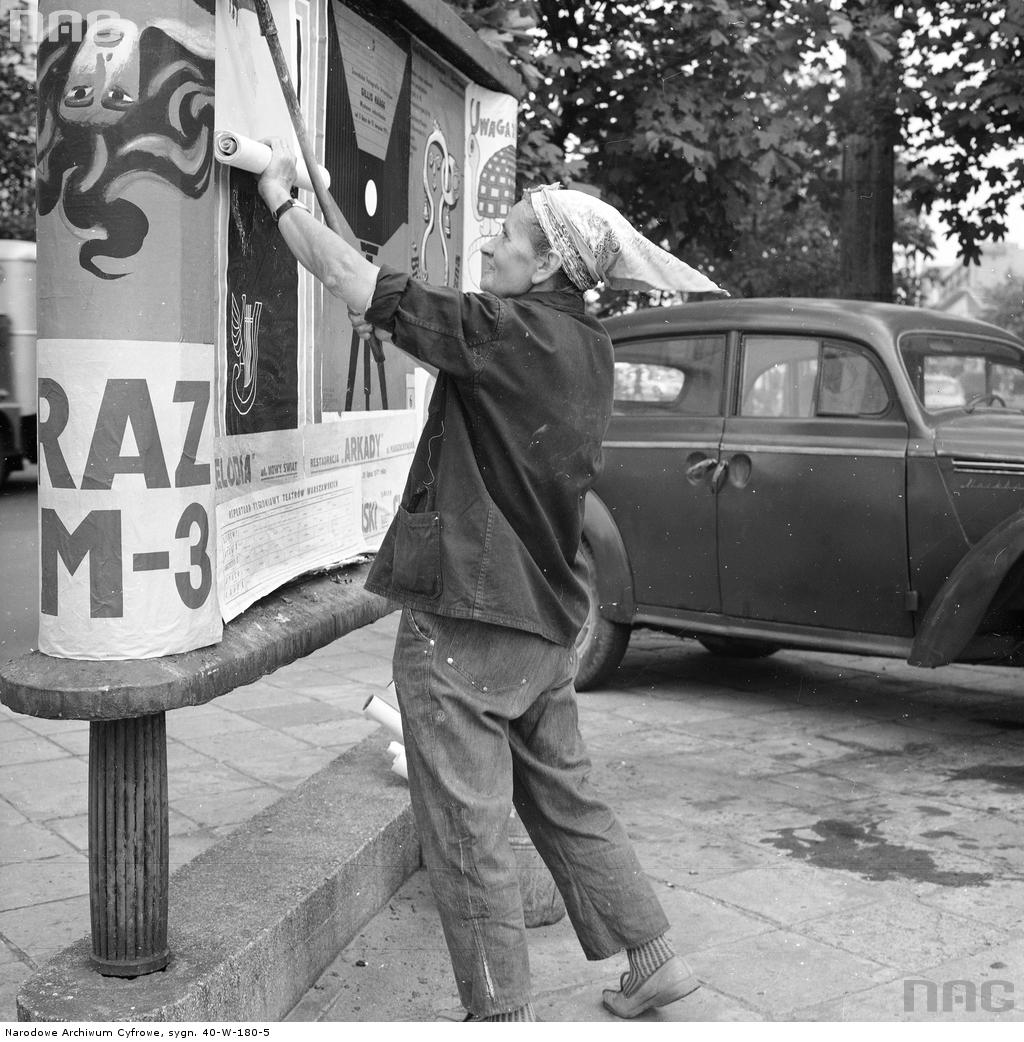
Photograph of a woman hanging posters in Warsaw by Grażyna Rutowska (1971)

From the early 1950s to the late 1980s, the Polish School of Posters (Polish: Polska szkoła plakatu) was an artistic movement that used conceptual images to make outdoor posters. They were distributed throughout postwar communist Poland to publicise cultural events and film releases. Before printing could proceed, the poster artwork had to be approved by the state censorship agency. The prevailing circumstances brought about posters that were notably singular, which in turn, led to the international recognition of their creators.

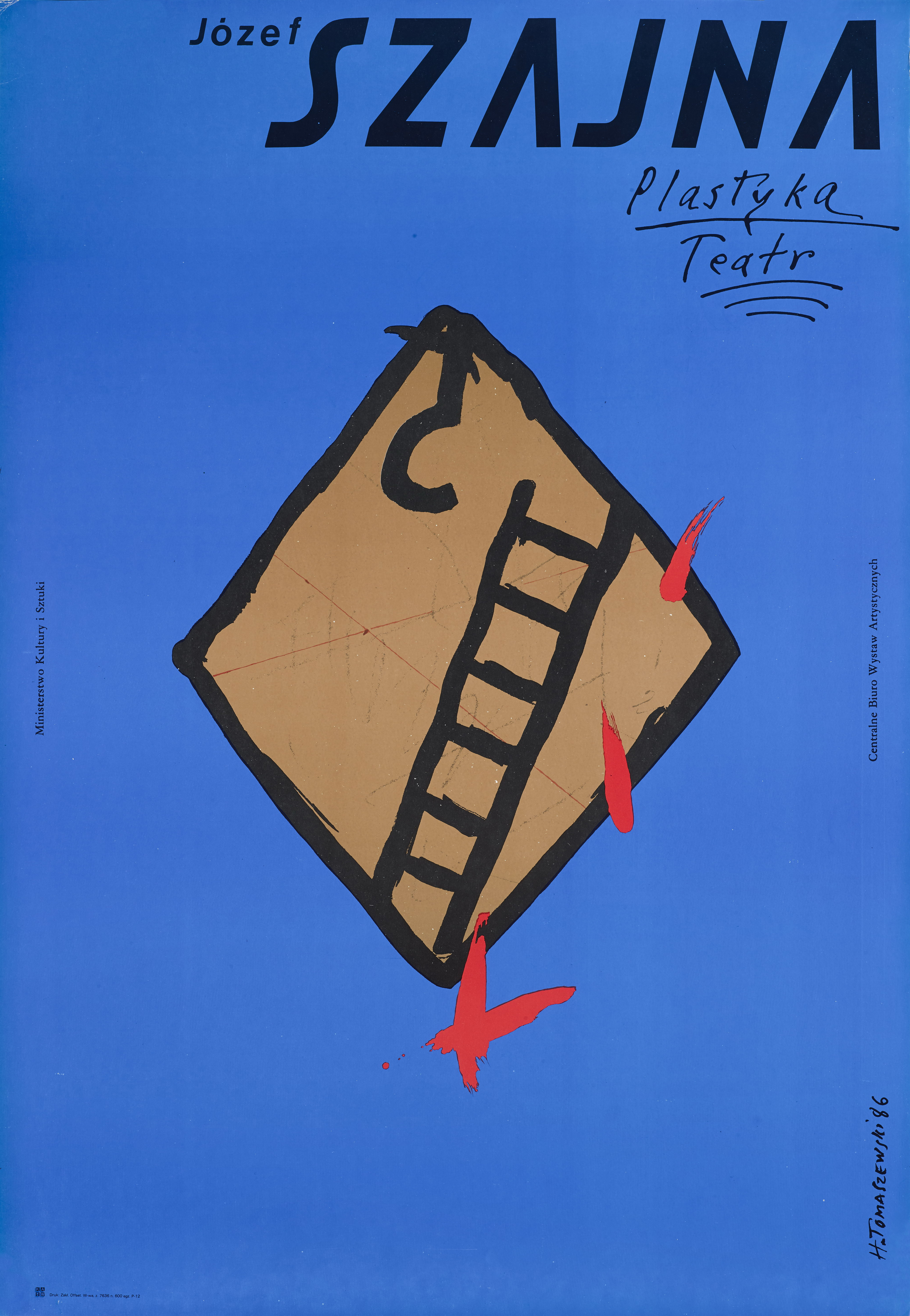
Poster announcing a Józef Szajna exhibition by Henryk Tomaszewski (1986)

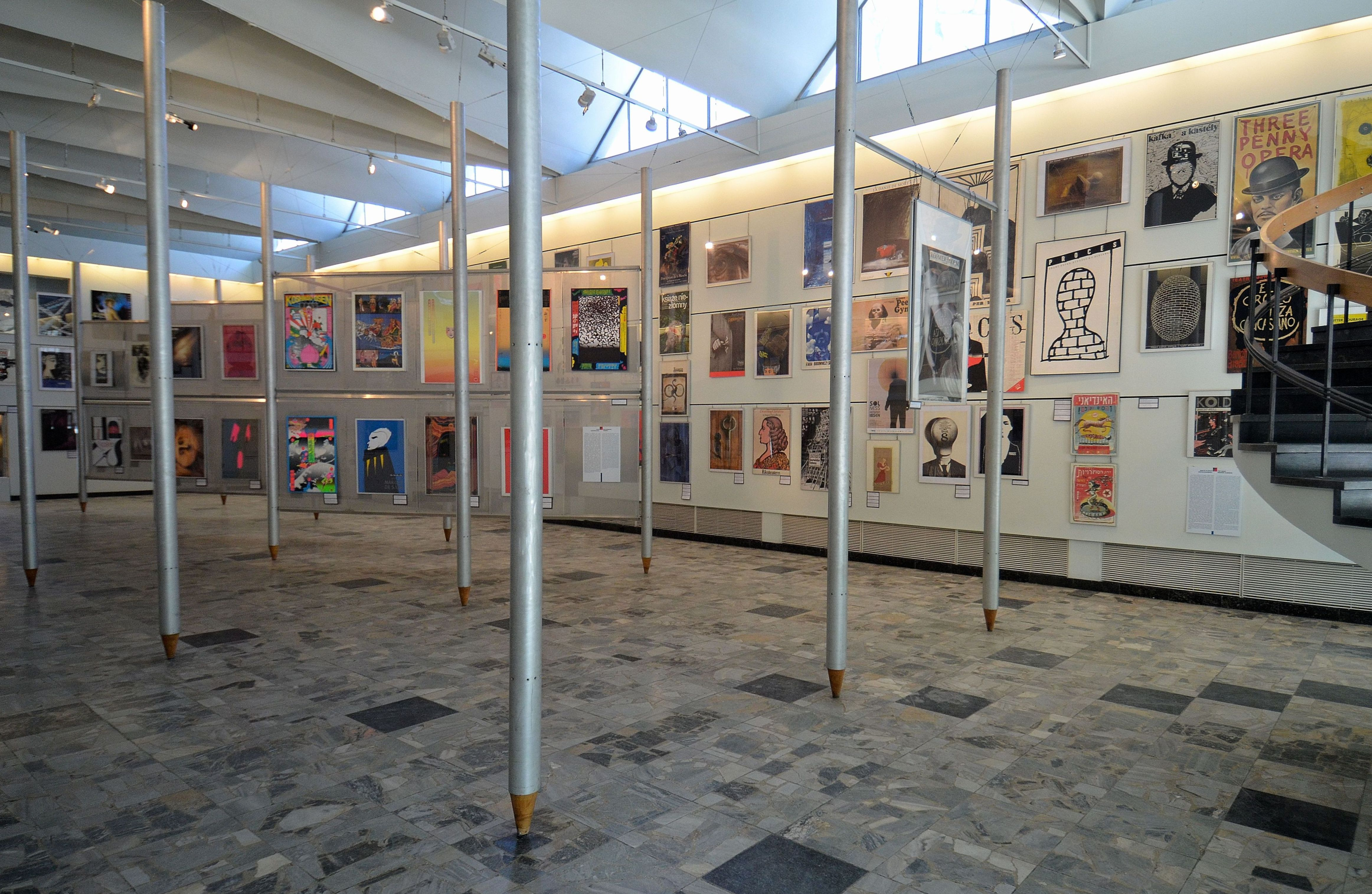
Exhibition at the Poster Museum in Wilanów (2013)

The Polish School of Posters blurred the distinction between designer and illustrative artist. Above all, commissioned practitioners undertook the image-making of their own visual ideas. Pictorial economy was broadly championed, with succinct metaphors becoming a preferred way to communicate meaning. Though differing formal techniques were present throughout the movement, a vibrantly coloured painterly approach was frequently adopted, and the individuality of the images was emphasised by hand-lettered typography.

== History ==
After the Second World War Poland was absorbed into the Soviet Bloc, and the Provisional Unity Government began reconstruction of the country. Under communist bureaucracy, and within a centrally planned economy, propaganda posters became a part of the state's social engineering. Moreover, the reopening of cultural venues spurred the need for event posters. The utility of poster design elicited state support, and became a viable output for illustrative artwork. Though constrained by institutional censorship, a group of Poland's designers made conceptual posters that communicated with allusions and metaphors. This became a recurring feature of the Polish School of Posters.

One of those early figures was the pioneering graphic artist, Henryk Tomaszewski. After taking first place five times at the 1948 International Film Poster Exhibition in Vienna, Polish posters began attracting global attention. From 1952 he became a professor at the Warsaw Academy of Fine Arts, where a dedicated poster department was established. He and many other notable practitioners came to be affiliated with the Warsaw Academy, including Józef Mroszczak, Jan Młodożeniec, and Waldemar Świerzy to name just a few.

After the death of Joseph Stalin in 1956, repression gradually waned, and poster designers could exercise more artistic freedom. Unlike their Western counterparts, there was no market-driven influence on what they created. Consequently, the posters that emerged from Poland, did not heed the conventions that were being fostered by Western advertising. In Poland's outdoor spaces were seen diverse conceptual posters that publicised concerts, festivals, exhibitions, films; both domestic and foreign, performances at the theatre, the opera, and promoted the state circus. From 1966 onward, the movement was buttressed by the International Poster Biennale in Warsaw, the world's first cyclical event dedicated to posters. Similarly in 1968, the world's first poster museum was opened in Wilanów.

In the years that followed, emerging practitioners learned from established designers, and could engage with an ever-growing professional network of galleries, museums, and publishers. This continued until 1989, when the Solidarity Trade Union achieved major wins in the Sejm and Senate, heralding the end of communist rule in Poland. Soon after, the country transitioned to a market economy, thereby removing the conditions that gave rise to the Polish School of Posters.

== Global influence ==
With its characteristic use of allusions, the Polish School influenced cultural and political poster designers abroad, particularly in France, England, and the United States. As designers travelled for exhibitions and lectures around the world, awareness of the movement grew. Commissions were undertaken for institutions beyond Poland, and in some cases, practitioners relocated to pursue their careers elsewhere. Such was the case with Jan Lenica, Rafał Olbiński, Wiktor Górka, and Jan Sawka.

Enrolment in poster design courses came mainly from Poland, but also attracted some applicants from other countries. Notable additions to the student cohort were members of the French design collective Grapus, Andrzej Klimowski from Britain, and the acclaimed French poster artist, Alain Le Quernec.

== Collections ==
The largest and most complete private collection of Polish posters, dating from 1909 to the modern era, is the Rosenberg Poster Collection. The collection includes posters that were made during political oppression after the Second World War. In this environment of censorship and regulation, artists focused on the poster as a medium to express meaning and add color to the streets of post-war Poland.

The largest state-owned collection of Polish posters is the Poster Museum at Wilanów. It was founded in 1968 and is housed at the Wilanów Palace complex in Warsaw.

== Notable examples ==
- 1948: Czarny Narcyz by Henryk Tomaszewski. Black Narcissus film poster.
- 1948: The Last Stage by Tadeusz Trepkowski. Film poster.
- 1952: “Nie!” (“No!”) by Tadeusz Trepkowski. Political poster.
- 1962: Ewa Kossakowska. Circus poster.
- 1963: Jerzy Srokowski. Circus poster.
- 1963: Zawrót Głowy by Roman Cieślewicz. Vertigo film poster.
- 1964: Wozzeck by Jan Lenica. Opera poster.
- 1967: Dziewczyna O Zielonych Oczach by Maria Ihnatowicz. The Girl with Green Eyes film poster.
- 1970: Maciej Urbaniec. Circus poster.
- 1972: Kabaret by Wictor Gorka. Cabaret film poster.
- 1973: Zbrodniarka Czy Ofiara by Ewa Gargulinska. Kuro no bonryu, Ordinary Darkness film poster.
- 1979: Andrzej Pagowski. Circus poster.
- 1981: Possession by Barbara Baranowska, for the 1981 film.

== Artists ==
- Barbara Baranowska, also known as Basha
- Maks Bereski
- Roman Cieślewicz
- Jacek Ćwikła
- Rafal Olbinski
- Wojciech Fangor
- Mieczyslaw Gorowski
- Tadeusz Jodlowski
- Jan Lenica
- Bogusław Lustyk
- Jan Młodożeniec
- Józef Mroszczak
- Jerzy Napieracz
- Jan Sawka
- Franciszek Starowieyski
- Waldemar Świerzy
- Piotr Szyhalski
- Henryk Tomaszewski
- Maciej Urbaniec
- Mieczyslaw Wasilewski
- Stanislaw Zagórski
