= Wiktor Sadowski =

Polish artist (born 1956)

Wiktor Sadowski is a Polish artist working in poster, illustration and painting. He was born in Oleandry, Poland in 1956. He graduated in 1981 at the Academy of Fine Arts in Warsaw in Tomaszewski's studio.

== Major awards ==
- 1984 - Gold Medal, IX/X International Poster Biennale, Warsaw (Poland)
- 1985 - Gold Medal, XI Biennale of Polish poster, Katowice (Poland)
- 1986 - 1st and 3rd Prizes, 2nd International Theater Poster Competition, Osnabruck (Germany)
- 1990 - International Association of Business Communicators/IABC/Award (USA)
- 1990 - 3rd Prize, Art Directors Club, 69th Annual Exhibition, New York, (USA)
- 1991 - 2nd Prize, 3rd International Theater Poster Competition, Osnabruck (Germany)
- 1994 - Gold Medal, Society of Illustrators, New York (USA)

== See also ==
- List of graphic designers
- List of Polish painters
- List of Polish graphic designers
- Graphic design
