= Wilanów Collection =

Coordinates: 52°9′55″N 21°5′26″E

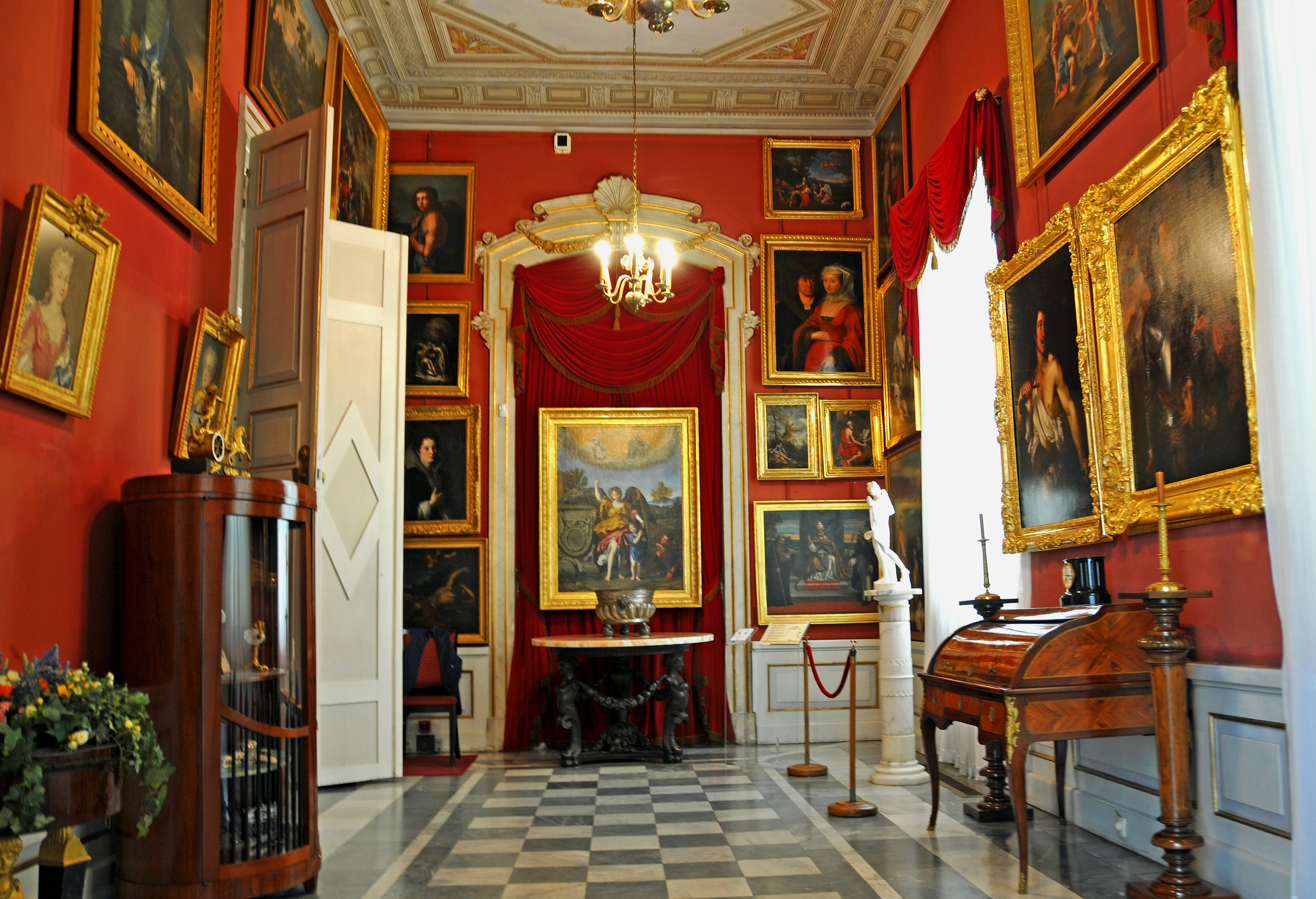
- Established: 1805
- Location: Wilanów Palace; Warsaw, Poland
- Type: art museum
- Website: www.wilanow-palac.pl

Kolekcja wilanowska is an art collection displayed at the Museum of King John III's Palace at Wilanów at the Wilanów Palace in Warsaw, Poland. The museum was established in 1805 by Stanisław Kostka Potocki.

== See also ==
- Poster Museum at Wilanów
