= Barbara Baranowska =

Polish poster artist

- Born: February 17, 1934 (age 92); Katowice, Poland
- Other names: Basha, Bacha
- Education: Krakow Academy of Fine Arts
- Known for: Poster art
- Spouse(s): Adolf Rudnicki; Andrzej Żuławski; Christian Ferry

Barbara Baranowska (born February 17, 1934), known professionally as Basha, is a Polish artist, known for designing book covers and movie posters, with her most well-known art being the poster for the 1981 film Possession.

== Career ==
Baranowska studied painting at the Krakow Academy of Fine Arts during the 1950s, being one of only a handful of women associated with the so-called Polish School of Posters of the 1950s and 1960s. She started out designing book jackets — in particular, a series of covers for works by Adolf Rudnicki. She later did some illustrations for children's books, and even film costumes. Her simple red cow design for a Polish brand of butter has been used for decades.

She designed the poster for, and had a cameo in, Janusz Morgenstern's 1960 film Goodbye, See You Tomorrow. She was also asked by Roman Polanski to star in his 1962 film Knife in the Water, but declined. In the 1970s she created French posters for multiple films, including Slaughterhouse-Five, The Sugarland Express, Taking Off, Willy Wonka & the Chocolate Factory and her most famous, Possession.

Baranowska took the nickname for Barbara, "Bacia" (alternately Bacha or, finally, Basha, to avoid pronunciation confusion) to sign her posters when she moved to Paris.

Baranowska lived in Hollywood for a time during the late 1970s, where she completed a series of portraits. Subjects included Alfred Hitchcock, Barry Diller and Charles Bluhdorn.

Twenty-one of her works are held in the Poster Museum, Wilanów, and more are in private collections around the world. From May 25 through June 15, 2013, the Horse Hospital displayed her work, describing it as "unforgettable". An exhibit of her film posters and biographical discussion was done in Montreal, Canada during the Fantasia International Film Festival from July 26 through August 4 in 2013.

== Personal life ==
Baranowska's first husband was the author and Holocaust survivor Adolf Rudnicki. She left him for Andrzej Żuławski, director of the film Possession. Rudnicki inspired the character Abe in the film (which was ultimately not used). Żuławski had resented Baranowska for her rising success, as well as wanting to remain childfree; he was known to be a womanizer and cheated on her. She was later introduced to producer Christian Ferry by Żuławski, and married him after Żuławski left her and returned to Poland. Baranowska remained married to Ferry until he died in 2011. She stated, "I owe Andrzej the most wonderful thing that has happened to me in my entire life. It was thanks to him that I met Christian Ferry - my man, the man of my life."
