= Ewa Gargulinska =

Polish painter

- Born: 27 August 1941 (age 85); Kraków, Poland
- Education: Academy of Fine Arts in Kraków, Academy of Fine Arts in Warsaw
- Known for: Painting

Ewa Gargulinska (born 27 August 1941) is a Polish painter. She is known for her Romantic Expressionist work. Gargulinska was a visiting lecturer at the School of Visual Arts in New York City from 1982 to 1983, and at Central Saint Martins in London from 1984 to 2011. Gargulinska currently lives and works in London.

== Life ==
Gargulinska was born into a family of old Polish nobility from Lwów and Kraków. During the Second World War, her family's estate was confiscated by the Soviets when they invaded Lwów. Subsequently, Gargulinska's paternal grandmother was taken to a camp in Siberia where she was later liberated by General Sikorski's army and took part in its exodus through the Middle East. Gargulinska, her mother and maternal grandmother were taken to Pawiak concentration camp during the Warsaw Uprising and escaped before it was destroyed by the Nazis.

After the war, Gargulinska and her family moved to Sopot, a seaside resort where there were more work opportunities for Gargulinska's father. Gargulinska attended primary school there until her parents divorced and the family moved back to her grandmother's apartment in Kraków. The numerous relocations the family had to endure interfered with Gargulinska's education causing her to have a sense of displacement, however, it encouraged the development of her artistic talent.

After a three-month stay in Paris at the age of seventeen, Gargulinska decided to change her initial plan to study French philology, and entered the Academy of Fine Art in Kraków. After a year studying in Kraków, she moved to the Academy of Fine Art in Warsaw, the leading art school in Poland, providing new teaching methods from the Bauhaus as well as the Russian avant garde movement.

Gargulinska's studies included tuition under Professor Henryk Tomaszewski (the most influential poster designer of his day). Poster Design became a new futuristic art form, considered at the time to surpass traditional fine art for its imaginative expression. Gargulinska received her MA degree from the Academy of Fine Art in Warsaw 1960-1966. Her work from this period was taken into the Academy of Fine Arts Archive and exhibited at The Young Talents exhibition at the Foksal Gallery in Warsaw.

During the rise of the Polish Film School movement, poster art reached its peak and was enthusiastically received in the west. Gargulinska's poster images were shown in a group exhibition at the ICA in London in 1971. In 1972 Gargulinska managed to obtain permission from the communist security office to travel to London where she worked as a set and textile designer as well as a visual artist for a year. In 1973 she was required to return to Warsaw. Following a disturbing incident with the communist secret police, Gargulinska decided to leave Poland permanently which was forbidden under the communist regime. A German friend helped Gargulinska across the border and took her to Hamburg. While waiting for an English visa, Gargulinska sold her first paintings and images of film posters to private clients in order to survive.

Following her return to London 'Gargulinska's versatility has been apparent through her wide-ranging career. Her art has been exhibited internationally and is represented in several public collections including: the National Museum of Women in the Arts, Washington DC and the "Zacheta" National Gallery of Contemporary Art in Warsaw, Poland. Her paintings are collected worldwide, most notably by Doctor Arthur Sackler (founder of the new wing at the Royal Academy, London and the extensions to the Metropolitan and Smithsonian Museums in the United States), Cusacks, Jeremy Irons, Sir Michael Scott and Vernon Ellis, Chairman of the English National Opera. She has painted portraits in New York, designed theatre sets for the Gate Theatre in Dublin, posters for Madam Tussauds in London.'

== Artistic work ==
Gargulinska has described her work as combining abstract and figurative elements. In an artist's statement, she identifies metaphor and mythology as recurring means of exploring emotional, spiritual and metaphysical themes. Her website describes her artistic style as "Romantic Expressionist" and states that her paintings combine abstract and figurative forms.

=== Red in Drama, Myth and Miracle ===
A commentary attributed to Cyril Barret and dated March 1999 describes Gargulinska's paintings in terms of classical mythology, sculpture and psychology, and notes their tendency to combine figurative imagery with non-naturalistic forms. The text is reproduced on Gargulinska's website and identifies Barret as head of philosophy at Campion Hall, Oxford.

=== Mysteries ===
The National Theatre Archive's catalogue records a 2004 press release that listed Mysteries: Paintings by Ewa Gargulinska among exhibitions at the Royal National Theatre.

Gargulinska's website reproduces a passage attributed to art critic Dorothy Walker of the Irish Independent, which discusses the paintings in relation to grief, melancholy and sorrow and comments on their use of deep blue, red and purple, with occasional yellow. The passage associates the paintings with the themes of mourning in Jan Kochanowski's Laments.

=== The Dilemma of Three ===
Gargulinska's exhibition history lists exhibitions in Beijing in 2010, including exhibitions at Embassy House and the Polish Embassy. The artist's existing biographical material describes a series titled The Dilemma of Three in terms of interrelated figurative forms and subdued colours, but no independent source for the detailed description has been located.

== Collections ==
=== Public Collections ===
- National Museum, Kraków
- Madame Tussauds Museum, London
- National Museum of Women in the Arts Archives, Washington DC
- National Gallery Zacheta Archives, Warsaw
- Copernicus University Archives, Torun
- Academy of Fine Arts Archives, Warsaw

=== Private Collections ===
- Arthur M Sackler Collections, New York City
- Sir Michael Scott, Ireland
- Jeremy Irons, England
- Cyril Cusack, Ireland
- Vernon Ellis, Chairman of the English National Opera, London
- Lionel de Rothschild, England

== Exhibitions ==
- 1966 — Young Talents, Foksal Gallery, Warsaw
- 1971 — ICA Group exhibition, London
- 1972 — Project Arts Centre, Dublin
- 1976 — Caldwell Gallery, Dublin
- 1976 — Polish Cultural Institute, London
- 1981 — Jablonski Gallery, London
- 1989 — Central College of Art, London
- 1989 — International Exhibition of Women Painters, Paris
- 1991 — Piano Nobile Gallery, Kraków
- 1992 — Polish Artists Association, London
- 1994 — Polish Cultural Institute, London
- 1995 — Dillon Gallery, London
- 1995 — Flaminia 58, Rome
- 1995 — Polish Cultural Institute, Rome
- 1996 — Polish Cultural Institute, Stockholm
- 1997 — Groucho Club, London
- 1998 — Soho House, London
- 1999 — Royal National Theatre, London
- 2003 — Hutson Gallery, London
- 2003 — Rue de Phalsbourg, Paris
- 2004 — Royal National Theatre, London
- 2006 — Traffic Gallery, Warsaw
- 2008 — Museo de la Cultura Maya, Mexico
- 2010 — Embassy House, Beijing
- 2010 — Oxford University, Oxford
- 2010 — Polish Embassy, Beijing

== Commissions ==
- Dr Arthur M Sackler, New York
- International Medical Syndicate, New York
- Gate Theatre, Dublin — Set design and poster
- Sybil Connolly exhibition, New York and Chicago — Textile design
- Peter Luke's “Paquito”, Dublin — Illustrations and book design
- Irish Posts and Telegraphs, Dublin — Irish Christmas stamp design
- International Congress of the Society of Industrial Design, Dublin — Exhibition Design
- Abbey Theatre, Dublin — Poster design
- Dublin Theatre Festival — Set design/poster
- Madame Tussauds, London — Poster design

== Publications ==
- Studio International, London 1984
- Print, New York 1983
