= Wiesław Rosocha =

Polish artist (1945–2020)

- Born: 16 September 1945; Sokołów Podlaski, Poland
- Died: 15 March 2020 (aged 74); Warsaw, Poland
- Education: Academy of Fine Arts, Warsaw, PL
- Known for: Graphic designer, Illustrator
- Website: http://www.rosocha.pl

Wiesław Rosocha (16 September 1945 – 15 March 2020) was a Polish illustrator and graphic designer. Rosocha attended Warsaw Academy of Fine Arts from 1969 to 1974.

== Major awards ==
- 1981 - Special Prize for "Best Book Illustration of a Year" (Warsaw)
- 1985 - Gold Medal at 6th International Biennial of Posters in Lahti (Finland)
- 1986 - 1st Prize in Competition for the Best Children's Book of a Year (Warsaw)
- 1991 - Bronze Medal at International Triennial of Graphic Art in Toyama (Japan)
- 1992 - Gold Medal at 6th International Exhibition ADC in New York (USA)

== See also ==
- List of graphic designers
- List of Polish painters
- List of Polish graphic designers
- Graphic design
