= Maciej Urbaniec =

- Born: 1 September 1925; Zwierzyniec, Poland
- Died: 19 May 2004 (aged 78); Nowy Sącz, Poland
- Occupation: Artist

Maciej Urbaniec (1 September 1925 – 19 May 2004) was a Polish artist and graphic designer. He was one of the pioneers of the Polish Poster School.

== Early life ==
Urbaniec's father, John Zdzieblan-Urbaniec, was a diplomat. His first mentor was the sculptor Alfons Karny. His drawing teacher was Zygmunt Kamiński, who designed the Polish Coat of Arms. Urbaniec's father died in Lebanon in 1949 and his mother died in 1943 in Auschwitz concentration camp.

Urbaniec studied art in Wrocław and Warsaw and became a poster designer and commercial artist. After the war Urbaniec journeyed around the country. He stayed briefly in Silesia, then returned to Warsaw, and there he graduated from high school in 1951. In 1952, he married Mary Kotarbinska. He studied at the State College in Wrocław, and at the Academy of Fine Arts in Warsaw. He received a diploma with honors in 1958. At this time, he debuted as a poster designer with the poster Nie Moje in 1957, which was printed by the WAG and also published in GRAPHIS magazine.

== Career ==
He worked as a Professor at the Academy of Fine Arts (ASP) in Warsaw from 1975 until his death.

In the 1970s, Urbaniec worked for American publisher Jack Rennert and began his collaboration with Warsaw theaters (The Grand Theater, National Theater, The Ateneum Theater). The theater became the center of his works.

== Legacy ==
His teaching had a significant impact on the artists of the Third Generation (1960s–80s) of the Polish School of Posters.

== Art ==
Urbaniec is a graphical time traveler and his posters represent postcards from various eras. His art is a mixture of styles. He was inspired by historical facts. He refers to the interwar avant-garde: geometry combined with photography, while colors are reduced to black, white, and red. Examples of how Urbaniec combines senses in his works are Nie hałasuj niepotrzebnie, Chroń ręce. However, one of his most reproduced and acclaimed works is ABC abc—a poster diagram of 1972. It is a photographic image of three heavy bombs, marked the first letters of the alphabet—with inserted under them by the same lowercase letters, drawn in colored chalk, awkwardly, like a child's hand.

Urbaniec's style conveys simple and powerful messages; often with the use of ingenious and humorous devices, as well as painterly gestures with elaborate metaphors. His Mona Lisa CYRK poster, which is in the collection of the Museum of Modern Art, New York, was honored with a postage stamp issued in 2002 by the Polish post office.

== Recognition ==
- 1958 – Trepkowski Award, Poland
- 1970 and 1974 – 3rd and 2nd Prize, IV & VI Biennale of Graphic Design, Brno, Czech Republic
- 1972 – 1st Prize of International Posters for Peace Competition, Polish Peace Committee, Warsaw
- 1977 – Silver Medal of 6th Polish poster Biennale in Katowice
- 2000 – 2nd Prize – Competition for 17th International Poster Biennale, Warsaw
- Member–Alliance Graphic Internationale (AGI) since 1974.

== Remarks ==
- "Remove everything from the poster, which is not necessary. Use typography as equivalent in composition. Have the pleasure of doing what you think is right and the courage to walk."
- "Sport and art have one of the best ideas of the humanities. The essence of this idea lies in the pursuit of excellence, achievement and exceeding the human capabilities."
