= Rafał Olbiński =

Polish illustrator and painter

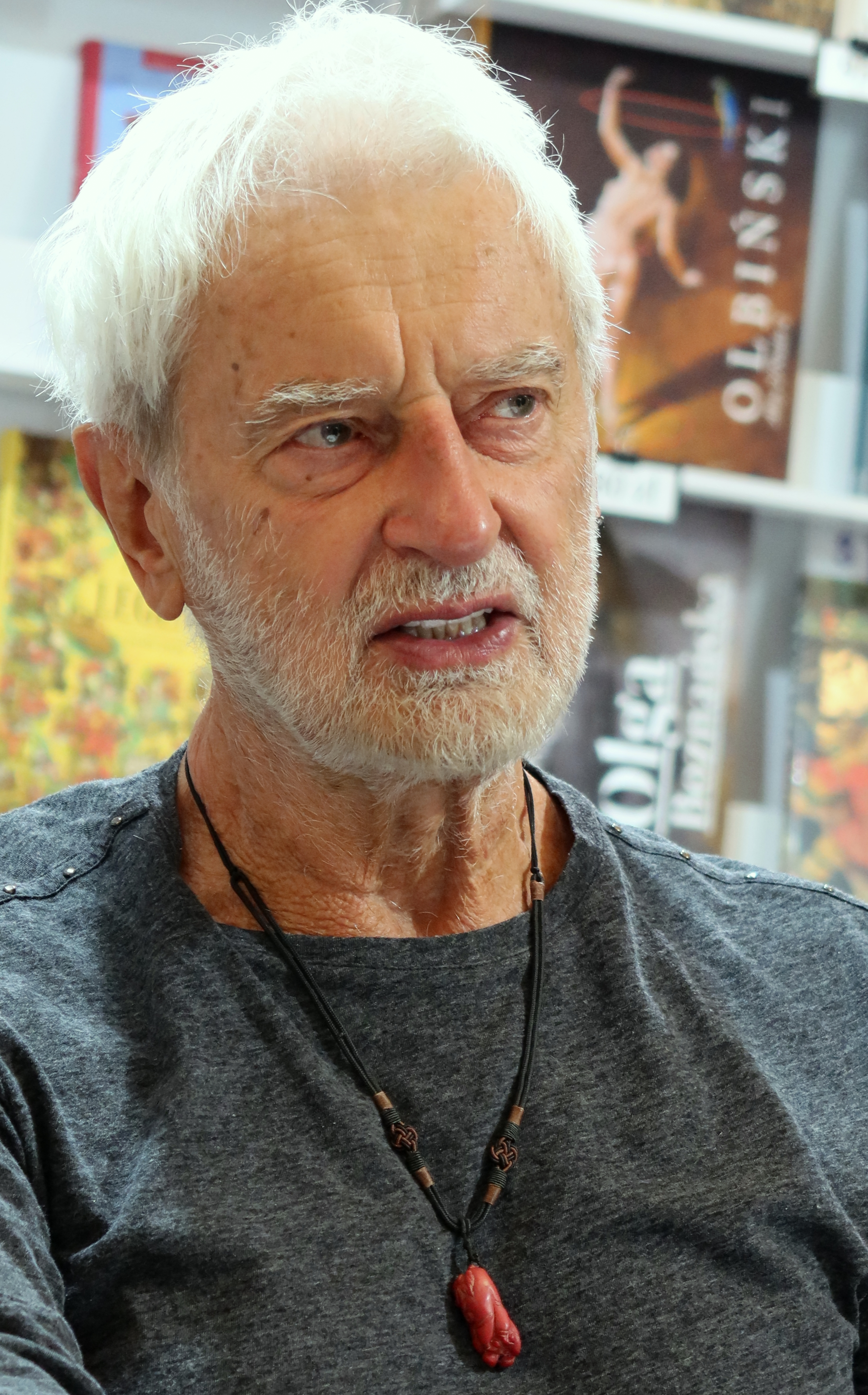
Rafał Olbiński - Warsaw (Poland), 16 May 2025

Rafał Olbinski (born February 21, 1943) is a Polish illustrator, painter, and educator, living in the United States. He is considered one of the major representatives of the Polish School of Posters.

== Biography ==
Olbinski was born in Kielce, Poland. He graduated from the architecture program of the Warsaw University of Technology in 1969.

== Career ==
Olbinski immigrated to the United States in 1981, where he soon established himself as a prominent painter, illustrator and designer. Olbinski's work is very similar to the work of the famous Belgian surrealist Rene Magritte; Olbinski describes his approach to painting and illustrating as "poetic surrealism". He has cited his influences as "everybody", specifically Saul Steinberg, Milton Glaser, Marshall Arisman and Brad Holland.

Rafal Olbinski's works are included in the collections of the Museum of Modern Art (Poster Collection), the Carnegie Foundation in New York, National Arts Club in New York, the Smithsonian Institution and the Library of Congress in Washington, Suntory Museum in Osaka, Japan, the Poster Museum in Warsaw, Poland, and others throughout Europe and the United States.

In 1992 Olbinski began a close collaboration with Sheri and Kenneth Nahan of Patinae, Inc. and Nahan Galleries. They continue to represent his works worldwide since that date.

In 1996 he was commissioned by the U.S. Information Agency to design a poster celebrating the 25th Earth Day Anniversary. From 2002 through 2010, a selection of Olbinski paintings was included in the Grand Space projection in Grand Central Terminal, as a highlight of the Earth Day Celebration in New York. The other artists featured in the show are Keith Haring, Roy Lichtenstein, Robert Rauschenberg, and Andy Warhol.

In 1999 Olbinski was commissioned to create a surreal image of San Francisco, by Gallery 444. The proceeds from the painting were given to The SF Chronicle Season of Sharing Fund, funding services for those in need. This was followed by a major exhibition of paintings by Olbinski held at Gallery 444.

In 2001, the Willy-Brandt House in Berlin presented the works of Rafal Olbinski in a one-man retrospective exhibition entitled "Art at the Turn of the Century".

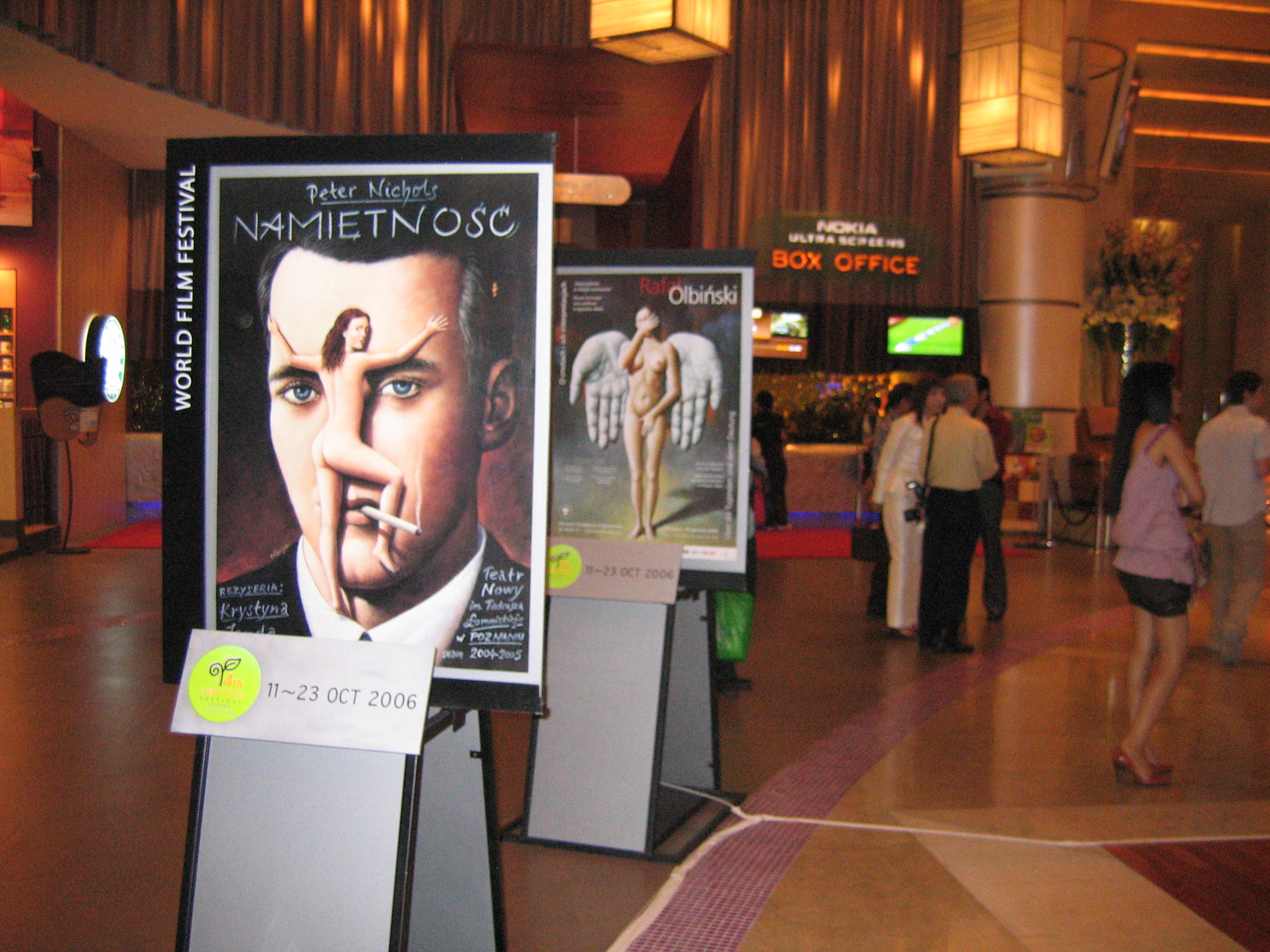
Poster art by Olbinski on exhibit during the fourth World Film Festival of Bangkok, Thailand, 2006

In 2002 he created the set designs for the Opera Company of Philadelphia's performance of Mozart's Don Giovanni, highly acclaimed by critics in the New York Times and the Philadelphia Inquirer. In the same year the exhibition "Art with Moral Purpose" at the Goethe Institute in Hamburg exhibited the paintings and posters of Olbinski.

Olbinski was commissioned to create several paintings, illustrating articles and essays on moral values, which appeared in seven consecutive issues of the German news magazine Stern. This led to a traveling exhibition of these paintings, the first hosted by the wife of the then President of Germany, Eva Luise Köhler.

In 2008 Olbinski had a one-man exhibition titled "Olbinski - photokina Expo" for Hewlett Packard (Cologne, Germany). In 2009 he had a large museum exhibition at The Jule Collins Smith Museum in Auburn entitled "New Dreams of Old Values".

He has completed many large murals for installations in public space in Europe. He has produced more than 100 opera illustrations for album covers for Allegro-Music's Opera D'Oro Series.

Olbinski is on the faculty of the School of Visual Arts in New York City.

== Awards ==
For his artistic achievements, he has received more than 150 awards including Gold and Silver Medals from the Art Directors Club of New York, Gold and Silver Medals from the Society of Illustrators in New York and Los Angeles, and The Big Crit 2000 award by Critique Magazine in San Francisco. In 1994 he was awarded the International Oscar for The World's Most Memorable Poster, Prix Savignac in Paris. The President of the Republic of Poland awarded Olbinski the highest award in the field of arts, the gold medal, "Gloria Artis."

In 1994, he received the Creative Review Award for the Best of British Illustration in London. In 1995 his poster was chosen as the official New York City Capital of the World Poster in an invitational competition by a jury led by Mayor Rudy Giuliani. In the following year he won the Steven Dohanos Award for the best painting in the Annual Member Exhibition of the Society of Illustrators. In July 2002 the city of Fondi, Italy awarded him Divina Giulia for his contribution to contemporary art.
