= Possession (1981 film) =

Horror film by Andrzej Żuławski

- French theatrical release poster by Barbara Baranowska
- Directed by: Andrzej Żuławski
- Screenplay by: Andrzej Żuławski
- Adaptation and dialogue by: Andrzej Żuławski; Frederic Tuten
- Produced by: Marie-Laure Reyre
- Starring: Isabelle Adjani; Sam Neill; Heinz Bennent
- Cinematography: Bruno Nuytten
- Edited by: Marie-Sophi Dubus; Suzanne Lang-Willar
- Music by: Andrzej Korzyński
- Production companies: Oliane Productions; Marianne Productions; Soma Film Produktion
- Distributed by: Gaumont Distribution
- Release dates: 25 May 1981 (Cannes); 27 May 1981 (France)
- Running time: 124 minutes
- Countries: France; West Germany
- Language: English
- Budget: $2.4 million
- Box office: $1.1 million (U.S. only)

Possession is a 1981 psychological horror and drama film written and directed by Andrzej Żuławski. The plot obliquely follows the relationship between an international spy (played by Sam Neill) and his wife (Isabelle Adjani), who begins exhibiting increasingly disturbing behavior after asking for a divorce. An international co-production between France and West Germany, it is Żuławski's only English-language feature.

Żuławski developed the screenplay amid the emotional aftermath of his divorce from actress Małgorzata Braunek and his exile from Poland after production on his film On the Silver Globe was halted in 1977. He was introduced to American novelist Frederic Tuten; the two collaborated on the adaptation and dialogue in New York and Paris. Principal photography took place in West Berlin in 1980, near the Berlin Wall, on a budget of $2.4 million. Carlo Rambaldi created the film's tentacled creature effects.

Possession premiered at the 34th Cannes Film Festival, where Adjani won the Best Actress award for her performance, and was released theatrically in France on 27 May. While not commercially successful either in Europe or in the United States, with the latter only receiving a heavily edited cut on its initial release, the film acquired cult status and has been more positively reappraised in later years.

An American remake directed by Parker Finn is scheduled for release on 11 June 2027.

== Plot ==
Mark is a spy who returns home to West Berlin after a mission to discover that his wife, Anna, is seeing another man and wants to separate. Mark turns over their apartment and custody of their young son, Bob, to Anna. After a long drinking spree, Mark returns to find Bob alone and unkempt. He resolves to be Bob's primary caregiver and unsuccessfully pressures Anna to end her extramarital relationship with a phone call. Anna leaves during the night, allegedly to stay with her friend Margie.

Mark meets Bob's teacher, Helen, who inexplicably looks identical to Anna except for her lighter hair and green eyes. Mark visits Anna's lover, Heinrich, in his apartment, and confronts him about the affair. After a tense conversation, Mark tries to attack Heinrich, who beats him down and carries him away. Mark returns home to find Anna with Bob, and the couple argue, culminating in Mark repeatedly striking Anna; she then leaves.

Mark hires a detective to tail Anna and interrogates Anna about their relationship, to which Anna responds by cutting her neck with an electric knife. Mark intervenes, treats her wound, and deliberately cuts his arm with the knife. The detective follows Anna to her derelict apartment and calls to inform Mark of the address. The detective poses as a safety inspector and searches the apartment. He finds a bizarre creature in the bathroom, after which Anna kills him. Mark withholds Anna's address from Heinrich. Helen helps Mark care for Bob and reveals that Bob has been experiencing sleep terrors. After putting Bob to bed, Helen and Mark have sex.

Anna kills Zimmermann, the detective's work superior and romantic partner, after he finds the tentacled creature and the detective's body in her apartment. Heinrich leaves Mark footage of Anna hurting one of her ballet students by holding her in a difficult pose to test her willpower, telling Heinrich that their relationship is similar, and describing a conflict between Faith and Chance, as well as the pain that her affair will cause to Mark.

Anna returns and tells Mark that she is caring for her Faith in her apartment after violently miscarrying it in the subway while he was gone. After Anna leaves, Mark reveals her address to Heinrich. Anna shows Heinrich the creature and dismembered corpses before stabbing him. Heinrich flees and calls Mark to arrange a meeting at a bar. Mark discovers the body parts at Anna's apartment, but Anna and the creature are gone. Mark meets Heinrich, kills him in the bar's toilet, and stages it as an accidental death. He sets Anna's apartment on fire and rides home on Heinrich's motorbike. He discovers that Anna has stolen Zimmerman's car and killed Margie, who saw the creature. Mark and Anna have sex. Anna takes the creature to Margie's place. Mark takes Bob to Helen's apartment, then drives to Margie's place, where he witnesses Anna having sex with the creature. Mark visits Heinrich's mother, who kills herself by overdosing on pills.

Mark resists pressure from two former associates to rejoin their mission. He later finds them approaching Margie's place with a police officer. Mark forces a taxi driver to ram the police car as a distraction to allow Anna to escape in Zimmermann's car, though Margie's body is dislodged from the trunk, and Mark is badly wounded in a shootout and motorbike accident while fleeing. He enters a building and climbs its staircase until he collapses. He is found by Anna and the creature, now a fully formed doppelgänger of Mark with green irises. Mark raises his gun to shoot it, but a hail of bullets from the police below strikes him and Anna down. Mark and Anna share a final kiss before Anna kills herself with his gun, and Mark jumps to his death. The doppelgänger climbs the stairs and mysteriously compels a woman to fire on the police so that he can escape.

Helen is babysitting Bob when her doorbell rings. Bob implores her not to open the door, but Helen ignores him and walks towards the door. Bob races to the bathroom and drowns himself in the bath. The sounds of sirens, planes, and explosions fill the air outside. Mark's doppelgänger presses his hands on the glass door pane as Helen stares straight ahead, her green eyes shining.

== Cast ==
- Isabelle Adjani as Anna / Helen
- Sam Neill as Mark / Mark's doppelgänger
- Margit Carstensen as Margit "Margie" Gluckmeister
- Heinz Bennent as Heinrich
- Johanna Hofer as Heinrich's mother
- Carl Duering as Detective
- Shaun Lawton as Zimmermann
- Michael Hogben as Bob
- Maximilian Rüthlein as Man with pink socks (as Maximilian Ruethlein)
- Thomas Frey as Pink socks' acolyte
- Leslie Malton as Sara, woman with club foot
- Gerd Neubert as Subway drunk

== Themes ==
Trying to classify Possession, critics drew parallels with Roman Polanski's Repulsion and David Cronenberg's The Brood. Despite being referred to as a psychological drama, psychological horror, and supernatural horror, efforts to put a genre label on the film have largely been met with frustration and disagreement. J. Hoberman commented, "Made with an international cast in still-divided Berlin, the movie starts as an unusually violent breakup film, takes an extremely yucky turn toward Repulsion-style psychological breakdown, escalates into the avant-garde splatterific body horror of the '70s (Eraserhead or The Brood), and ends in the realm of pulp metaphysics as in I Married a Monster from Outer Space."

A number of critics deny that the tentacular creature is a literal entity: it may be a reflection of Anna's psychosis; the product of Mark's inflamed consciousness, unable to accept his wife's betrayal; or a kind of revenge of the film's director (Żuławski) traumatized by his own divorce from his ex-wife.

Some who have written about Possession have paid attention to the film's doppelgänger motif. Both spouses die, but they are replaced by doubles, ideal models of husband and wife. Anna "grows" a double of Mark from the creature, an indefatigable lover who is always by her side. The real Mark finds a copy of Anna in the person of the school teacher Helen— she is a gentle character and does not demand anything from Mark, being an "ideal housewife".

=== Sociopolitical context ===
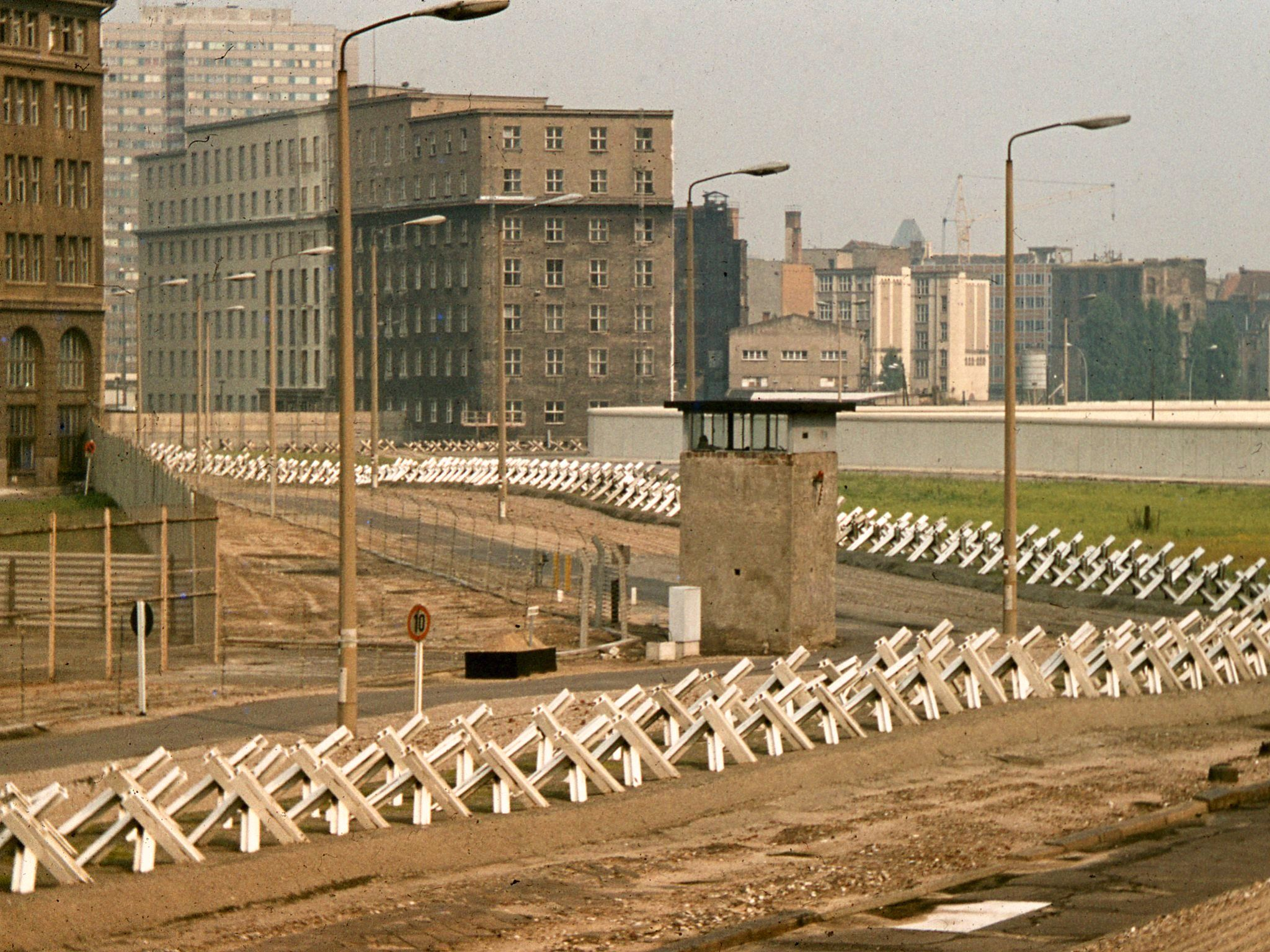
Berlin Wall in 1977

As in the case of The Devil, the director placed political subtext under the layer of expressive horror after deliberately choosing Berlin as it was the least remote point from Poland and other countries of the European socialist bloc. The plot of Possession is not limited to an autobiographical description of a difficult breakup, separation and marital disintegration in family relations— at that time Żuławski also experienced a final separation from Poland. (Note: Żuławski himself tells more about this in an interview with Daniel Bird. The recording of the interview can be found in the supplementary material for the British DVD release of the film, published in 2010 by the company Second Sight, and also 2014 Blu-ray release by Mondo Vision.) Two houses in the film— the modern one, which is Mark and Anna's apartment, and the old abandoned house in Kreuzberg, where Anna hides the squid-like creature— are located next to the Wall. The film contains elements of a spy thriller. Mark, an intelligence agent, leaves his job for his family. Anna leaves her family to become an "agent of the dark forces". The confrontation ends with death for both, and in the last frames of the film, there is a direct allusion (the sounds of sirens and the rumble of explosions) to the armed conflict that began in the city divided in two, which could end in a nuclear apocalypse.

Scholar Bartłomiej Paszylk writes that the metaphors present in the film also represent "a disintegrating country. The very fact that the film takes place in Cold War-era West Berlin is quite significant for the metaphor of divorce— the wall that separates it from East Berlin being a symbol of disconnection of what was once united— but [Żuławski's] additional intention might have been for the Berlin wall to symbolize the Iron Curtain, and for Germany to symbolize Poland, a country he had to leave in order to keep making movies."

== Production ==
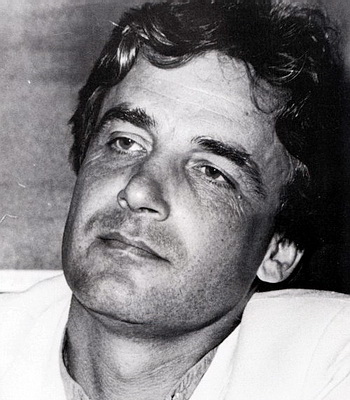
Director Andrzej Żuławski (pictured, c. late 1980s)

Żuławski approached Danièle Thompson and asked if she would work on a film. After receiving a script about 20 pages long, Thompson suggested Frederic Tuten; thus, Żuławski went to New York to meet him. They worked on the script for the film in New York and Paris while Żuławski was in a state of deep depression. In 1976, he divorced actress Małgorzata Braunek. Żuławski recalled how he once returned home late in the evening and found his five-year-old son Xavier alone in the apartment, smeared with jam, after his wife left him alone for several hours— this scene was directly reflected in Possession. A year and a half later, following the authorities' halting of work on his science-fiction epic On the Silver Globe in 1978, the director faced a de facto ban and was forced to leave Poland. While emigrating, he continued to linger on suicidal thoughts, which initially had improved by starting to work on a new film.

Żuławski and the film's producer, Marie-Laure Reyre, immediately chose Isabelle Adjani as Anna. By this time, Adjani had already become a celebrity, but the producers had reasons to expect that she would accept the offer. After an unsuccessful attempt to start a career in Hollywood (released in 1978, Walter Hill's The Driver failed at the box office), Adjani decided to return to European cinema. She starred in Nosferatu the Vampyre (1979), but it had not yet been possible to repeat her success in being nominated for the Academy Award for her role in The Story of Adele H. (1975). However, Adjani's management company turned down the offer, and the filmmakers chose the next candidate Judy Davis, whose work in the film My Brilliant Career (1979) impressed Żuławski. Sam Neill, a less well-known actor who appeared with Davis in the same film, was chosen for the role of Mark. Davis was hesitating over whether to take the role, so Adjani eventually accepted the offer.

The role was emotionally exhausting for Adjani. In one of the interviews, she stated that it took her several years to recover from her performance, which J. Hoberman called "a veritable aria of hysteria". It was rumored that she attempted suicide after filming completed, which was confirmed by Żuławski. Time Out magazine compared the behavior of her character to the actions of "a dervish of unrestrained emotion and pure sexual terror".

There were two takes. This scene was filmed at five in the morning, when the subway was closed. I knew it was worth a lot of effort for [Adjani], both emotionally and physically, because it was cold there. It was unthinkable to repeat this scene endlessly. Most of what's left on the screen is the first take. The second take was made as a safety net, as is customary when shooting difficult scenes, for example, in case the laboratory spoils the material.

— Żuławski on the filming of the scene with Anna's miscarriage in the subway passage

Sam Neill has also commented on the rigours of filming: "I call it the most extreme film I've ever made, in every possible respect, and he asked of us things I wouldn't and couldn't go to now [sic]. And I think I only just escaped that film with my sanity barely intact."

The budget for Possession was $2.4 million, and a 12-week shoot was scheduled. The director chose Berlin as the setting for the story because of its proximity to the Communist world. Principal photography began on 7 July 1980 in West Berlin, and most of the film was shot next to the Wall, in the Kreuzberg section of West Berlin. The "surrealist, clean quality" Żuławski wanted for the film was aided by the Steadicam work of camera operator Andrzej J. Jaroszewicz and Bruno Nuytten's cinematography and lighting. Carlo Rambaldi, a famed Italian special effects artist and the creator of the Alien animatronic head, assisted in creating the tentacle creature featured in the film.

== Release ==
Possession had its worldwide premiere at the 34th Cannes Film Festival, and was released in France on 27 May 1981. Barbara Baranowska, respected artist from the Polish Poster School (as well as Żuławski's first wife), created the French theatrical poster, showing a nude woman embraced by tentacles. This poster has been called iconic, and most distributors of the film opted to use it rather than replace it with photographic imagery, contrary to the standard practice for home media releases.

After an initial limited theatre release in the United Kingdom, the film was banned as one of the notorious "video nasties". On American screens, it came out in a heavily edited 81-minute cut version from Limelight International Films on October 28, 1983, having lost more than a third of its runtime; the distributor turned Possession into a creature based horror film, almost completely eliminating the psychological horror aspects and main theme of a marriage breakdown. This version was ridiculed by the American press as an example of "a cheap Grand Guignol" and had no public success.

A new 4K restoration of the film by Metrograph premiered in United States at Fantastic Fest in September 2021 and expanded nationwide on October 15.

=== Box office ===
Possession had a modest total of 541,120 admissions in France. In the United States, it was released on 28 October 1983 and grossed $1.1 million at the box office.

=== Home media ===
Although the film was banned from distribution in the United Kingdom, it was later released uncut on VHS and DVD in 2000 by Anchor Bay Entertainment. Second Sight Films released Possession on Blu-ray in 2013, featuring the complete version of the film and an audio commentary by screenwriter Frederic Tuten, moderated by film historian Daniel Bird. In 2025, the distributor released a three-disc 4K Ultra HD Blu-ray collector's edition, which included a newly restored version of the shortened North American theatrical cut, an interview with filmmaker Guillermo del Toro and multiple audio commentaries. The edition also featured a 220-page hardback book containing essays, archival material and interviews, alongside a separate 211-page reproduction of the original shooting script with notes by Andrzej Żuławski and Tuten.

In 2014, American distributor Mondo Vision released a region-free Blu-ray of the film featuring the uncut version. This release was available in a standard special edition, as well as a limited edition numbered to 2,000 units.

In France, Le Chat qui Fume released Possession on 4K Ultra HD Blu-ray in 2021, featuring both English- and French-language audio tracks. While working on the remaster, approximately three and a half minutes of previously unseen footage were discovered, originating from a longer version of the film that Żuławski had shortened before its theatrical release. The recovered footage was included in the release.

The Australian distributor Umbrella Entertainment released a region-free Blu-ray edition in 2022, followed by a 4K UHD Blu-ray on 25 October 2023.

== Reception ==
=== Critical reception ===
Possession received lukewarm critical response when it was initially released in the summer of 1981. Derek Malcolm of The Guardian stated that, while Żuławski displayed talent and the special effects were unforgettable, the film itself was far too serious for its own good. Leonard Maltin wrote of the film: "Adjani 'creates' a monster, to the consternation of husband Neill, lover Bennent—and the viewer", ultimately deeming the film a "confusing drama of murder, horror, intrigue, though it's all attractively directed". Vincent Canby of The New York Times wrote, "At times, the living-color Possession recalls Roman Polanski's black-and-white Repulsion, though only because Miss Adjani is required to slice up as many male victims as Catherine Deneuve did in the earlier, far better film."

Variety gave the film a positive review, praising Żuławski's direction, symbolism, and pacing, writing "mass of symbols and unbridled, brilliant directing meld this disparate tale into a film that could get cult following on its many levels of symbolism and exploitation".

Harry Haun of the New York Daily News alternately panned the film, awarding it one-and-a-half out of four stars and writing that Adjani's "prize-winning mad-act is impossible to appraise because the film it's in is outlandishly unhinged as well... Just about any dialogue accompanying this mess would seem ludicrous". The Philadelphia Daily News's Joe Baltake deemed the film a "boringly camp-elegante attempt by a group of reputable French, German and Polish filmmakers" and assessed Adjani's performance as "babbling, incoherent yet arresting". Baltake also criticized the massive amount of the film that was left out of the American version (approximately 50 minutes). Writer Maitland McDonagh believed the film's initial release in America where it was marketed as a straight horror film and screened in grindhouse theaters was a mistake, and it should have instead been released in art house theaters where it would have gained a better reception.

=== Legacy ===
In the years following its release, Possession accrued a cult following. Film scholar Bartłomiej Paszylk deemed it "one of the most enigmatic and uncompromising horror movies in the history of cinema".

Writer Kim Newman considers Possession to be a "kitsch film", noting: "Zulawski takes his film too seriously, but it's fun all the same ... [he] goes mad with his swooping camera, has everything in shot painted in blue and encourages his stars to attack their roles with a kind of stylised hysteria rare outside Japanese theatre." Newman also likened elements of Adjani's character to that of Samantha Eggar in The Brood (1979). Tom Huddleston of Time Out gave the perfect-star rating, and wrote "There are plenty of movies which seem to have been made by madmen. Possession may be the only film in existence which is itself mad: unpredictable, horrific, its moments of terrifying lucidity only serving to highlight the staggering derangement at its core. Extreme but essential viewing." Similarly, Slant Magazine's Budd Wilkins gave the film 4/4 stars, saying that "Many directors have taken full advantage of Adjani's exotic, ethereal French beauty; only Zulawski saw beyond the exquisite surface to something unsettling. Most disconcerting is the way Adjani can register almost demonic ill-intent while never losing some trace of the alluring." Ben Sachs from Chicago Reader called it a "confounding masterpiece". Dennis Schwartz from Ozus' World Movie Reviews gave the film a grade of "C+", calling it "[an] uncompromising demented cult oddity".

The film is included in Sight & Sound's The Greatest Films of All Time list. Michael Brooke of Sight & Sound commented in 2011, "Although it's easy to see why it was pigeonholed as a horror film, its first half presents what is still one of the most viscerally vivid portraits of a disintegrating relationship yet committed to film, comfortably rivalling Lars von Trier's Antichrist, David Cronenberg's The Brood and Ingmar Bergman's Scenes from a Marriage." Reviewing the Blu-ray release of the film in 2013, Michael Dodd of Bring The Noise was similarly impressed with what he called "an intense exploration of marital breakdown". He argued that this made Possession "one of the few horror films that successfully builds a back story for its main characters". Reviewing the film's Blu-ray release, Andrew Pollard of the British magazine Starburst rated the film eight out of ten stars, calling it "a visceral, violent, erratic and piercing effort that pokes and prods its audience any chance it gets"; Pollard would also praise the performances of Adjani and Neill, practical effects and unsettling tone. In his review of the 4K restoration, David Fear of Rolling Stone lauded the film as "a body-horror answer to Kramer vs. Kramer" and stated that the restoration was "jaw-droppingly beautiful".

On the review aggregator website Rotten Tomatoes, 87% of 46 critic reviews are positive for Possession. Its consensus reads, "Blending genres as effectively as it subverts expectations, Possession uses powerful acting and disquieting imagery to grapple with complex themes." On Metacritic, the film earned a weighted average score of 75 out of 100, based on 10 reviews, signifying "generally favorable reviews".

The music video for Massive Attack's "Voodoo in My Blood" (2016) pays homage to the subway scene, with Rosamund Pike wearing a maxi-dress and dancing wildly in a pedestrian underpass. Director Ringan Ledwidge acknowledged the influence, calling himself "a huge fan of" Possession.

=== Awards and nominations ===
Year	Award / Festival	Category	Nominees	Result
1981	São Paulo International Film Festival	Film Critics Prize	Andrzej Żuławski	Won
1981	Cannes Film Festival	Best Actress	Isabelle Adjani	Won (Note: Also for her performance in Quartet.)
1981	Cannes Film Festival	Palme d'Or	Possession	Nominated
1982	Cesar Awards	Best Actress	Isabelle Adjani	Won
1983	Fantasporto	Special Audience Jury Prize	Andrzej Żuławski	Won
1983	Fantasporto	Best Actress	Isabelle Adjani	Won

== Remakes ==
An Indonesian remake of the film titled Possession: Kerasukan was released in May 2024. In June of that same year, an American remake was announced, with Parker Finn writing, directing, and producing alongside Robert Pattinson and Roy Lee. Finn produces through his Bad Feeling banner, Pattinson through Icki Eneo Arlo, and Lee through Vertigo Entertainment. Paramount Pictures subsequently acquired the project. In April 2026, it was reported that Margaret Qualley and Callum Turner had been cast in the lead roles. In June and July 2026 respectively, Paul Dano and Diego Calva joined the cast. The film is set to be released on June 11, 2027.

== Sources ==
- Maltin, Leonard (1994). Leonard Maltin's Movie and Video Guide. Plume. ISBN 978-0-452-27327-6.
- Newman, Kim (2011). Nightmare Movies: Horror on Screen Since the 1960s (Revised ed.). A&C Black. ISBN 978-1-408-80503-9.
- Paszylk, Bartłomiej (2009). The Pleasure and Pain of Cult Horror Films: An Historical Survey. Jefferson, North Carolina: McFarland. ISBN 978-0-786-45327-6.
- Żuławski, Andrzej; Kim, Renata (2011). Żuławski. Ostatnie słowo (in Polish). Czerwone i Czarne. p. 240. ISBN 978-8377000199.
- Mazierska, Ewa; Goddard, Michael (2014). Polish Cinema in a Transnational Context. Boydell & Brewer. p. 333. ISBN 9781580464680.
- Atkinson, Michael (2008). Exile Cinema: Filmmakers at Work Beyond Hollywood. Horizons of Cinema. SUNY Press. p. 217. ISBN 9780791473788.
- Pyzik, Agata (2014). Poor but Sexy: Culture Clashes in Europe East and West. John Hunt Publishing. p. 309. ISBN 9781780993959.
