= Stanisław Zagórski =

Polish graphic designer (1933–2025)

- Born: Stanisław Andrzej Zagórski; 11 January 1933; Warsaw, Poland
- Died: 27 August 2025 (aged 92); New York City, New York, U.S.
- Education: Warsaw Academy of Fine Arts
- Known for: Graphic design Illustration; Type design

Stanisław Andrzej Zagórski (11 January 1933 – August 27, 2025) was a Polish graphic designer, illustrator, type designer and educator. He was known for his work in book design, record jackets, magazine illustration, posters and advertisements. Zagórski was one of the founders of the Polish School of Posters and became one of the first Polish graphic artists to achieve success in the United States. He has received numerous creative awards from the American Institute of Graphic Arts, the Art Directors Club of New York, and the Society of Illustrators.

== Biography ==
Stanisław Andrzej Zagórski was born on January 11, 1933, in Warsaw, Poland, to Karol Zagórski and Irena (née Jabłkowska) Zagórska. He graduated from the Warsaw Academy of Fine Arts in 1957. While attending the academy, he met Rosław Szaybo, who went on to also become a graphic-designer. Zagórski said meeting Szaybo was one of the most important things that happened in his life. They both studied under professors Wojciech Fangor and Henryk Tomaszewski. After graduation, he worked as a free-lance graphic designer in Warsaw, from 1957 to 1963, and also worked for a short time in 1963 in Paris.

In the spring of 1963, he came to the United States to visit his sister, for what was supposed to be a two-month visit. Shortly after arriving, he was contacted by the Polish Institute of Arts and Sciences of America, who offered him the chance to exhibit some of his work for a show they had planned in September. In that same month, he also exhibited his posters at the School of Visual Arts in New York. Both of these exhibits generated a great deal of interest in his work, and were highly acclaimed. His exhibit at the Institute of Arts and Sciences, consisted of twenty-two posters and several drawings and monotypes. According to Polish author Maria Brooks, his best posters at the exhibit were a poster illustrating the arrival of the Harlem Globetrotters in Poland in 1960 (which he later donated to the Museum of Modern Art); a poster called Warsaw in Art (a drawing of Warsaw's emblem, the mermaid); a UNESCO poster (a sketch of two men with an equality sign between them) for which he received the UNESCO second prize; and a poster advertising the French movie Landru.

In 1969, Zagórski contributed to the design of the newly established New York Public Radio, creating an early draft logo and a series of internal promotional posters. Though his designs were not adopted for the final branding, his experimental approach, incorporating fragmented letterforms and soundwave motifs, helped influence the brand's visual identity.

Polish art critic, Stanisław Ledochowski, opined that, "Zagórski's film posters are an excellent commentary on the films he illustrates ... one learns more from his posters than from most others ... since poster art admits a sensual joy of color and of unlimited form, there is the great temptation of falling into artistic hedonism ... in spite of this, Zagórski has remained an intellectual, avoiding superficial effects and mannerisms ... each of his posters is new and individual in style, and each evidences thoroughgoing thought and observation on the part of the creative artist." After the exhibitions, he made the decision to stay and try to establish himself in America.

Zagórski died on August 27, 2025, at the age of 92 in New York.

== Career ==
He started out his newfound career by selling a few works here and there to support himself. He shared an apartment with Tadeusz Łapiński, another Polish graphic designer, in Greenpoint, Brooklyn. His first professional job was for Harper & Row, designing a book cover. His second professional gig was an album cover for Atlantic Records, which helped launch a long relationship with the record company designing album covers and posters for them. In 1964, he started teaching at Temple University's Tyler School of Art and Architecture, where he remained until his retirement in 1990.

Like Zagórski said: it's all about illustrating with type.

— Paula Scher

Paula Scher, a student at Tyler at the time Zagórski was teaching, credits him as "a very important mentor". Scher said she was "afraid of typography. I didn't understand it. I wanted to be an illustrator, and I never knew how to position the typography". Scher recalls that Zagórski encouraged her to "illustrate with type" and "those three words made my entire career". She went on to say "I began drawing the type and discovering that typography could have form and then later when I began setting type at CBS Records, I found that you could be expressive simply by making choices". She also remembers traveling to New York with Zagórski in 1970, where she "made the rounds with her portfolio", visiting Push Pin Studios, where she met Seymour Chwast, who would later become her husband.

During his career, Zagórski illustrated covers for Stereo Review, Time Magazine and Opera News. He designed a poster for the 1983 television comedy-drama series The Irish R.M., created and designed an album cover for the American sitcom television series All in the Family, and designed the poster for the Rolling Stones US Tour 1978

=== Album cover artwork ===
External images
- Atlanta Records Albums
- via The Internet Archive
- The Sheriff by the Modern Jazz Quartet (1964)
- Loaded by the Velvet Underground (1970)
- Zagórskis album covers at a 1981 exhibition, (Portraits: Americans of Polish Origin), by photographer Czesław Czapliński in New York

In 1964, he started working with Atlantic Records and Columbia Records in New York. His first album cover for Atlantic was The Sheriff by the Modern Jazz Quartet. He went on to design covers for Ray Charles, Cream, Roberta Flack, Isaac Hayes, Eddie Harris, Barney Kessel, Roland Kirk, Professor Longhair, Blind Willie McTell, The Rascals, Billy Cobham, Otis Redding, Sam & Dave, Shirley Scott, The Spinners, The Velvet Underground and Jimmy Yancey

In 1970, he designed the album cover for Loaded by the Velvet Underground. Speaking to music journalist David Fricke, Zagórski said Atlantic Records would call; "tell me the album title, give a short description of the music, and since I was still very foreign in terms of experience in New York, I thought of 'Underground' in terms of the subway". He also admitted that when he designed the cover, he wasn't really familiar with the band. Fricke opined, "the cover has its own charm; it certainly suits the record's playful spirit of commercial subversion and is a neat twist on the Velvets' then-standing reputation as drugged-up terrors".

Atlantic also commissioned Zagórski to create posters for some of the companies roster of artists to display in record stores. Some of his notable posters included: Aretha Franklin, Roberta Flack, Wilson Pickett, Les McCann, Eddie Harris, David Crosby, Graham Nash, Stephen Stills, The Bee Gees, Keith Emerson, Greg Lake, Carl Palmer and Herbie Mann. Atlantic Records vice-president of publicity and advertising Bob Rolontz said "this is the first time a recording company has commissioned an artist of Mr. Zagórski's stature to create portraits of recording artists on such an extensive scale ... exhibited together, they make an eye-stopping display for record retailers and outlets". Two of the posters, Greg Lake and David Crosby, were selected as among the "best designed posters for the 1971–1972 period", and were featured in the December issue of Print Magazine, and also exhibited at the Mead Library of Ideas in the Pan Am Building in New York.

Selected album covers by Zagórski
Year	Album	Artist	Ref
1968	Double Cross	Hank Crawford	
1968	Hair	London Cast Recording	
1968	In Person at the Whisky a Go Go	Otis Redding	
1968	Time Peace: The Rascals' Greatest Hits	The Rascals	
1968	Wheels of Fire	Cream	
1969	First Take	Roberta Flack	
1972	Live Cream Volume II	Cream	
1972	New Orleans Piano	Professor Longhair	
1972	Young, Gifted and Black	Roberta Flack	
1972	In the Beginning (reissue cover)	Isaac Hayes	
1973	Jazz at the Plaza Vol. I	Miles Davis	
1974	Mighty Love	The Spinners	
1975	The Case of the 3 Sided Dream in Audio Color	Rahsaan Roland Kirk	
1977	Ram Jam	Ram Jam	

=== Time magazine covers ===
External images
- Time Magazine Cover Art
- via the National Portrait Gallery
- The Jesus Revolution
- Carlos Castaneda
- Is Capitalism Working?

In 1978, Time Magazine donated approximately eight hundred works of original cover art to the National Portrait Gallery, which included eleven of Zagórski's works for the magazine. Notable magazine covers he illustrated include prominent figures: Carlos Castaneda, Henry Kissinger, John Sirica, John Dean, Richard Bach and António de Spínola.

In June 1971, Zagórski did an illustration for the cover of Time titled, "The Jesus Revolution", which featured Jesus "looking like the lead guitarist in a folk-funk band". American scholar of religion Stephen Prothero described Zagórski's illustration of Jesus as a "freak to end all freaks ... bedazzled with pink skin and purple hair and framed by a psychedelic rainbow ... whether this Jesus was communing with his people or tripping on LSD is open to interpretation, but he was clearly experiencing an altered state of consciousness".

In 2016, American Christian film director Jon Erwin met with Greg Laurie, senior pastor of Harvest Christian Fellowship, and brought a copy of the 1971 magazine with him. Erwin told Laurie, "you know, I want this to happen for my generation, and I want to make a movie about this". In 2023, the movie Jesus Revolution was released, which told Laurie's story and the role of two Time covers in the Jesus movement, one being Zagórskis, and the other one, the controversial cover published in 1966, titled "Is God Dead?" In 2022, his 1973 portrait of John Dean, was featured with several other artist's drawings of people involved in the Watergate scandal, for an exhibition at the National Portrait Gallery, called "Watergate: Portraiture and Intrigue".

== See also ==
- Album cover art
- List of Polish artists
