= Hair (Original London Cast Recording) =

Cast recording
- Released: 1968
- Genre: Pop, R&B
- Label: Polydor; Atco (North America)
- Producer: George R. Marck, Andy Wiswell

Hair is a 1968 album recording of the London cast production of the musical Hair featuring Paul Nicholas, Vince Edward, Oliver Tobias, Michael Feast, Peter Straker, Annabel Leventon, Linda Kendrick, Marsha Hunt, Sonja Kristina and others conducted by Derek Wadsworth. The album was reissued in 1976 by Reader's Digest with a new cover using the playbill photo of Marsha Hunt. The original cover art is by Stanisław Zagórski.

== Track list ==
Reader's Digest 1976 LP cover changed to use the 1968 playbill photo of Marsha Hunt.

1. "Aquarius" - Vince Edward and Original London Cast
2. "Donna" - Oliver Tobias and Original London Cast
3. "Sodomy" - Michael Feast and Original London Cast
4. "Coloured Spade" - Peter Straker and Original London Cast
5. "Ain't Got No" - Michael Feast, Peter Straker, Joanne White and Original London Cast
6. "Air" - Linda Kendrick and Original London Cast
7. "I Got Life" Paul Nicholas and Original London Cast
8. "Hair" - Paul Nicholas, Oliver Tobias and Original London Cast
9. "My Conviction" - Andy Forray and Original London Cast
10. "Easy To Be Hard" - Annabel Leventon
11. "Frank Mills" - Sonja Kristina
12. "Where Do I Go" - Paul Nicholas and Original London Cast
13. "Electric Blues" - John Gulliver, Rohan McCullough, Andy Forray, Jimmy Winston, Paul Korda and Original London Cast
14. "Black Boys" - Collette Kelly, Rohan McCullough, Lucy Fenwick
15. "White Boys" - Marsha Hunt, Ethel Coley, Joanne White
16. "Walking In Space" - Original London Cast
17. "Abie Baby" - Peter Straker, Limbert Spencer, Leighton Robinson
18. "Three-Five-Zero-Zero - Original London Cast
19. "What A Piece Of Work Is Man" - Vince Edward, Leighton Robinson
20. "Good Morning Starshine" - Annabel Leventon, Linda Kendrick and Original London Cast
21. "The Bed" - Original London Cast
22. "Let the Sunshine In" - Annabel Leventon, Marsha Hunt and The Tribe
