= Bogusław Lustyk =

Boguslaw Lustyk (born 1940 in Warsaw, Poland) is a poster artist of the Polish School of Posters.

He graduated summa cum laude from the Academy of Fine Arts in Warsaw in 1965. Lustyk has worked as a painter, poster designer and graphic artist since 1965. His style is poetic and creative, lighthearted and amusing, usually employing muted tones. He specializes in equine posters.

== Major awards ==
- 1968 – 2nd Prize – Polish Olympic (Mexico City, Mexico) Poster Competition, Poland
- 1973 – Special Prize at the Polish Poster Biennial Exhibition
- 1998 – Official Kentucky Derby Artist of the Year, Louisville, Kentucky, USA

Major one-man exhibitions include:

- 1974 – House of Arts, Warsaw, Poland
- 1977 – Poster Gallery, Warsaw, Poland
- 1989 – Deutschland Halle, Berlin, Germany
- 1990 – Museum of Hunting and Riding, Warsaw, Poland
- 1991 – Gallery Limea, Malmö, Sweden
- 1993 – Art-Studio Gallery, Warsaw, Poland
- 1994 – International Museum of the Horse, Kentucky Horse Park, Lexington, Kentucky
- 2001 – National Museum of Dance, Saratoga Springs, New York
- 2001 – Saratoga International Gallery, Saratoga Springs, New York

Other exhibitions:

- Hanover, Germany (1976); Katowice, Poland (1980); Stockholm, Sweden (1989); Filderstadt, Germany (1989); Paris, France (1990); Gdańsk, Poland (1992); Atlanta, United States (1996), Washington DC, USA (1989, 1996)
