= Waldemar Świerzy =

Polish artist

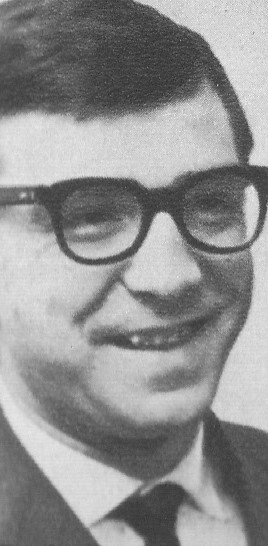
- Born: September 9, 1931; Katowice, Silesian Voivodeship, Second Polish Republic
- Died: November 27, 2013 (aged 82); Warsaw, Masovian Voivodeship, Third Polish Republic
- Resting place: Powązki Military Cemetery
- Education: Kraków Academy of Fine Arts
- Movement: Polish School of Posters

Waldemar Świerzy (c. 1931 – 27 November 2013) was a Polish artist.

== Life ==
Born in Katowice, Poland, he graduated from the Kraków Academy of Fine Arts in 1952. He was subsequently Professor in the University of Fine Arts in Poznań from 1965 and Professor in the Academy of Fine Arts in Warsaw from 1994.

In 1992 the government of Poland issued a postage stamp to honor one of his Cyrk posters, 'Clown with derby'. Swierzy is one of the Polish School of Posters' most prolific artists, having created over 2500 posters.

He employed unusual concepts with a variety of techniques, frequently mirroring Polish social history from 1950s through 1980s, with a myriad of styles: folk art from the 50s, pop art from the 60s, portraits from the 70s, and TV images from the 80s. In addition, his Jazz Greats series of famous American jazz personalities became so well known that he reissued them in his later years as signed lithographs. The series includes: Louis Armstrong, Ray Charles, Jimi Hendrix, Charles Mingus and Charlie Parker, among others. The lithographs were editioned by S2Art. The first group, which came out in March 2003, were of Ray Charles, Ella Fitzgerald, Thelonious Monk, Benny Goodman, Miles Davis, and Dizzy Gillespie. King Oliver and Lester Young followed a few years later.

== Major awards ==
- 1956 - Tadeusz Trepkowski Prize, Warsaw, PL
- 1959, 1962 - 1st (Toulouse-Lautrec) Prize -1st and 3rd International Film Posters Exhibition, Versailles, FR
- 1961, 1962, 1963, 1966 August -"Best Poster of the Month": 1968, 1971, 1972, 1975 February -"Best Poster of the Month", 1976, 1980, 1983, 1988 -"Best Poster of the Year", Warsaw's Best Poster Competition, PL
- 1964 - 1st Prize -Film Poster, "Poster of the Year", Copenhagen, DK
- 1965 - 1st Prize, 1971-1st Prize, 1975-1st Prize, 1977-2nd Prize, 1985-1st Prize, 1987-2nd Prize, 1989-1st Prize -Polish Poster Biennale, Katowice, PL
- 1967, 1971 - Award, Posters -Polish Ministry of Culture & Art, Warsaw, PL
- 1970 - 1st Prize -X Art Biennale di São Paulo, BR
- 1972 - 2nd Prize, 1976 -1st Prize -4th and 6th International Poster Biennale, Warsaw, PL
- 1975 - 1st Prize, 1980 -2nd Prize, 1985-1st Prize -Key Art Award, Posters -The Hollywood Reporter, Los Angeles
- 1977 - 1st Prize -II Poster Biennale, Lahti, FI
- 1985 – 1st Prize in the Annual Film Poster Competition of "The Hollywood Reporter", Los Angeles
- 1985 - 1st, 3rd Prize -"Jazzpo", International Jazz Poster Exhibition, Bydgoszcz, PL

== Major exhibitions ==
- 1960 – Galerie in der Biberstrasse; Vienna, Austria
- 1964 – Documenta Kassel; Kassel; Germany
- 1978 – Poster Museum Wilanow; Warsaw, Poland
- 1980 – Poliforum Siqueiros; Mexico City, Mexico
- 1982 – Galerie Oxe; Copenhagen, Denmark
- 1989 – Taldemuseo; Lahti, Finland
- 1991 – Creation Gallery GB, Tokyo, Japan
- 1993 – Festival de l'Affiche, Chaumont, France
- 2000 – Plakat Kunsf Hof; Essen, Germany
- 2001 – Museum of Contemporary Art; Tehran, Iran
- 2002 – Muzeum Miejskie Wrocławia; Wrocław, Poland

Member of Alliance Graphique International (AGI) since 1965.
