= Mieczysław Wasilewski =

Polish graphic designer

- Born: 1942 (age 83–84); Warsaw, Poland
- Education: Academy of Fine Arts, Warsaw, PL
- Known for: Graphic designer

Mieczysław Wasilewski (born 1942) is a Polish graphic designer.

He studied at the Warsaw Academy of Fine Arts. He taught graphic design at the University of Damascus 1981 - 1982. He has a professorship at the Warsaw Academy of Fine Arts in the Department of Graphic Arts.

== Major awards ==
- 1976 - Gold Medal, 6th International Poster Biennale, Warsaw (Poland)
- 1989 - Silver Medal, 13th Biennal of Polish Poster, Katowice (Poland)
- 1991 - Special Jury Prize, 2nd Poster Festival, Chaumont (France)
- 1994 - Silver Medal, 14th International Poster Biennale, Warsaw (Poland)

== See also ==
- List of graphic designers
- List of Polish painters
- List of Polish graphic designers
- Graphic design
