= Piotr Szyhalski =

- Born: Piotr Szyhalski; 1967 (age 58–59); Kalisz, Poland
- Education: Academy of Visual Arts, Poznań
- Known for: Graphic design, Installation art, New media art

Piotr Szyhalski is a Polish-born and trained multimedia artist working in the United States since 1990. He has produced poster designs, mail art, photographs, painted murals, prints, web-based digital art, sound art, large installations, and public performances. Since 1998 he has worked under the pseudonym Labor Camp.

== Life and education ==
From Kalisz in central Poland, Szyhalski studied at the Academy of Visual Arts in Poznań graduating in 1989 with an MFA in drawing under Waldemar Świerzy and an MFA in poster design under Jarosław Kozłowski. In 1990 Szyhalski came to the United States to teach graphic design at the School of the Museum of Fine Arts in Boston. Since 1994 he has been a professor of media arts at the Minneapolis College of Art and Design.

== Selected works ==
=== Private Post-Cards (1987–1990) ===
Before Szyhalski himself traveled outside of Poland, his mail art had reached a network of correspondents around the world in the form of postcards. These were contact prints on photographic paper from handmade negatives, either paper cutouts glued to glass or cliché verre designs scratched into a black-coated glass plate. Some of these Private Post-Cards were published in zines like Lloyd Dunn's PhotoStatic.

=== Electric posters (1996) ===
Each of these 30 animated posters "slowly evolves through a series of carefully orchestrated transitions of text and image," usually contradicting the initial message and confounding viewers' expectations. The animation speed was not programmed, but was based on the inherent limitations of the early internet: slow download speeds, HTML 2.0 and Netscape 1.1.

Szyhalski commented, "[T]his really isn't about computers anymore.... This is no longer about the tools, this is a new possibility of communicating thoughts and feelings.... I work on little posters on the internet, but they are never things, only ideas.... Suddenly you can just communicate thought.... [I]t reaches you but you can't buy it."

=== Ding an sich (1996) ===
This interactive web-based artwork was the first commission of the Walker Art Center's New Media Initiatives department. The New York Times on the Web commented, "Szyhalski's user-controlled creation is deeply involving and richly allusive. It is his most fully realized work to date and one of the most accomplished pieces of art on the Web.... Like Vladimir Nabokov and Tom Stoppard, the Polish-born Szyhalski has an Eastern European's flair for extracting the multiple meanings from a word in his newly adopted tongue."

=== The Inward Vessels of the Spleen (1996) ===
Szyhalski's first website included the Electric Posters and Ding an sich along with thirteen increasingly interactive pieces. The Wall Street Journal quoted Szyhalski as saying "that the Web artist relies on audience participation to make the work exist. In some cases, authorship becomes a joint project between the artist and the viewer."

=== Visual interpretation for Stephen Heitzig's Nobel Symphony (2004) ===
"Originally premiered in 2001, Heitzeg's massive opus was augmented this time by state-of-the-art graphics created by students at the Minneapolis College of Art and Design, impressively directed by Piotr Szyhalski and projected on a huge screen above the chorus. Each of the symphony's six sections were introduced by vertical lines oscillating back and forth, leaving words in their wake, and interspersed with images of wood being sawed, shaped, and sanded to construct a chair, reflecting a poignant recurring sentence by Pablo Neruda, 'Peace begins in a single chair.'"

=== Dolphin Oracle II (2008) ===
Interactive multimedia installation by Piotr Szyhalski and Richard Shelton, commissioned by the Walker Art Center. Gallery visitors typed questions to a CGI-animated bottlenose dolphin whose artificial intelligence answered in dolphin noises that were subtitled in English on a large screen.

=== COVID-19: Labor Camp Report (2021) ===
In response to the global COVID-19 pandemic and political and social upheaval in the United States, Szyhalski drew and inked a poster a day from March 24 until the U.S. presidential election on November 3, 2020. Each of the 225 appeared daily on Instagram. Some were printed by followers and pasted on walls in Los Angeles, Minneapolis, Baltimore, and Philadelphia; and the entire series was published as a book. The New York Times said the series used "the style and language of propaganda posters to capture the pain and absurdity of the pandemic, with heavy doses of sarcasm and rage at the federal government's response... [T]he works are meticulous but piercing, like a carefully released primal scream."

== Selected exhibitions, installations, performances ==
- 1989: Stories of Love and Work, Galeria Wielka 19, Poznań, Poland
- 1990: Niedlugo Lepsze Dni (Better Days Soon), Galeria Akumulatory 2, Poznań, Poland
- 1990: Our Future in Our Hands!, Houston Center for Photography, Houston, Texas
- 1991: Our Future in Our Hands!, Museum of Contemporary Photography, Chicago; Work from the New Poland, California Museum of Photography, Riverside
- 1997: The Electric Posters Exhibition, Silicon Graphics Innovate Online Gallery
- 2000: Die Zeitstücke (Timeworks), SIGGRAPH 2000, New Orleans, Louisiana; and ISEA 2000, Paris, France
- 2001: One Art, Lightwork Gallery, Syracuse, New York
- 2004: Nobel Symphony, Interactive computer-generated visual interpretation of Steve Heitzeg's symphony for orchestra and chorus, Orchestra Hall, Minneapolis, Minnesota
- 2008: Theater of Operations, Ingenuity Fest 4, Cleveland, Ohio
- 2009: White Star Cluster: The Third Sonic Reenactment of Operation Iraqi Freedom, Laboral Cento de Arte y Creación Industrial, Giron, Spain
- 2011: Empty Words (so that we can do our living), 9-hour overnight multimedia event with poetry, dance, parade, and concert, Northern Spark Festival, Minneapolis, Minnesota
- 2012: In Habit: Living Patterns, director of the 9-hour overnight outdoor dance performance by Aniccha Arts, Northern Spark Festival, Minneapolis, Minnesota
- 2015: Three Factory Pieces, The Soap Factory, Minneapolis, Minnesota
- 2021: COVID-19: Labor Camp Report, Minneapolis Institute of Art, Minneapolis, Minnesota
- 2022: Piotr Szyhalski: We Are Working All the Time!, Weisman Art Museum, Minneapolis, Minnesota

== Awards ==
Szyhalski received the McKnight Visual Artist Fellowship for Visual Artists in 2009 and 2017.
