= Poster Museum (Warsaw) =

- Muzeum Plakatu

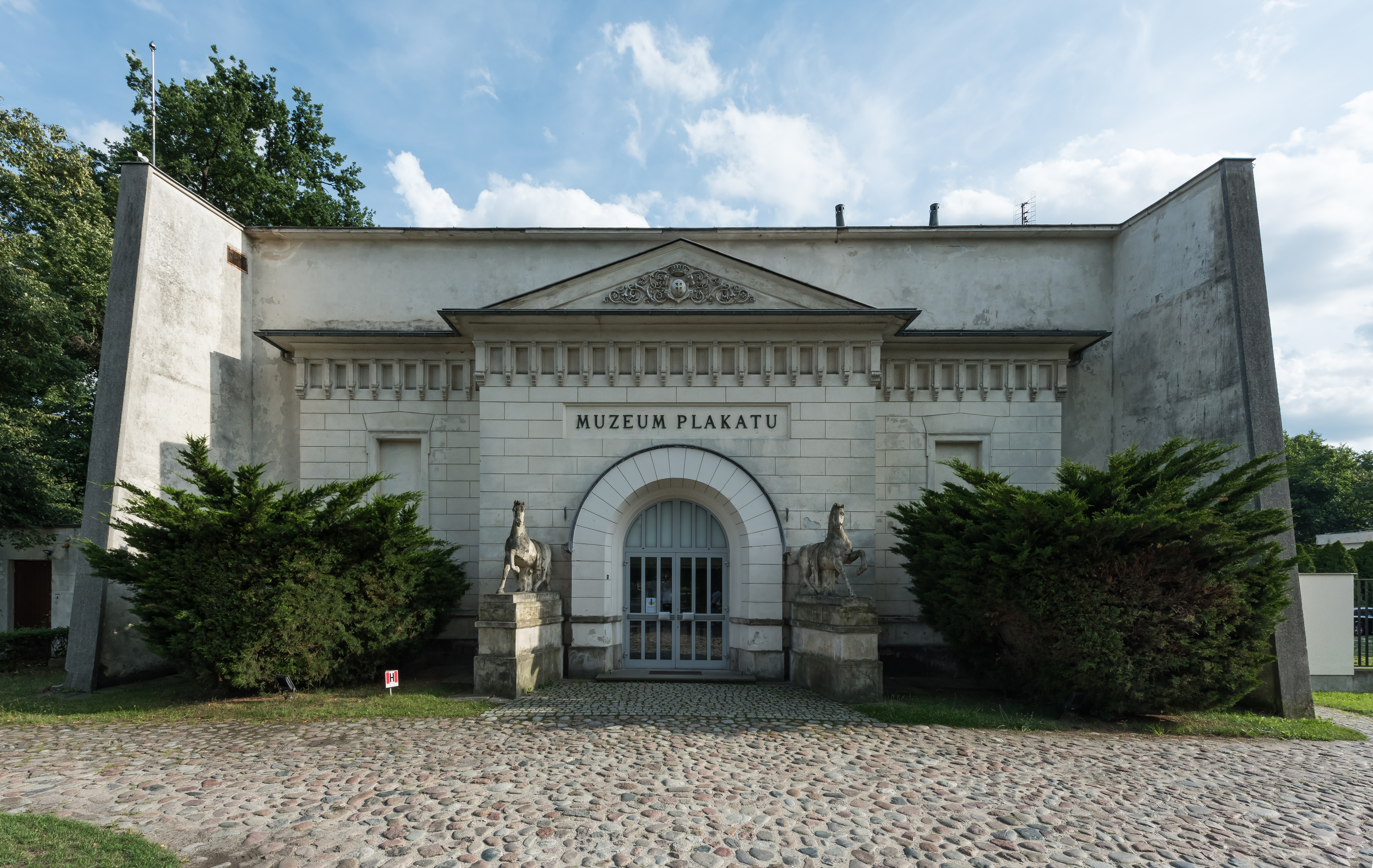
- The museum entrance
- Established: 1968
- Location: 10/16 St Kostki Potockiego Street, 02-958; Warsaw, Poland
- Coordinates: 52°09′52″N 21°05′17″E
- Type: Art museum
- Curator: Maria Kurpik
- Website: postermuseum.pl

The Poster Museum (Polish: Muzeum Plakatu) in Wilanów is the world's oldest poster museum. Founded in 1968, the museum is housed at the Wilanów Palace complex in Warsaw, Poland.

== History ==
The Poster Museum located in Wilanów is part of the National Museum in Warsaw. It was established through a grant of several thousand posters belonging to the National Museum, made by the museum's director, Stanisław Lorentz. The Poster Museum opened in June 1968, becoming the world's first museum dedicated to this art form.

At its founding, the museum had 13,000 items in its collection, including around 500 posters preserved from the World War II era. Its collection is continually growing, through gifts from Polish and international donors.

During the mid-20th century, Polish interest in poster art, and poster collecting, grew substantially, influenced by the visual style of national filmmakers such as Andrzej Wajda. Collectors sought posters advertising films, plays, and musicals in particular. Warsaw's annual poster art competition gained a worldwide reputation, ultimately leading the founding of the Poster Museum in 1968.

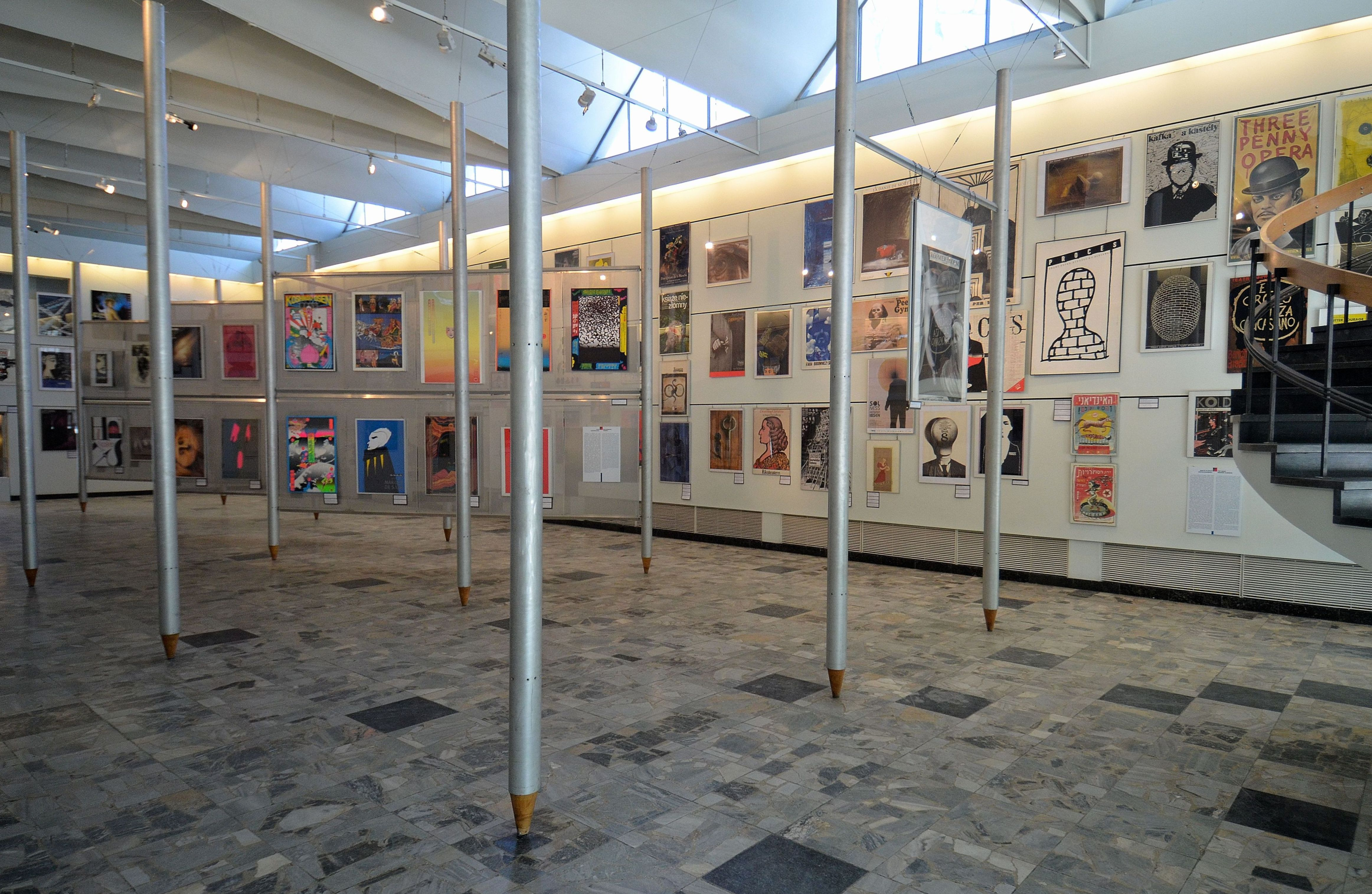
Exhibition space at the museum 2013

The Poster Museum is housed in a modern exhibition space erected behind the historic Wilanów Palace, a 19th-century riding school located on the outskirts of Warsaw.

In 2026 the museum reopened after a five year refurbishment project. A new exhibition featuring the works of members of the Polish School of Posters was prepared for the occasion.

== Collections ==
More than 55,000 posters are in the collections of the Poster Museum at Wilanów. 30,000 items represent the history of poster art in Poland from 1892 to 2002. The Poster Museum houses one of the world's largest collections of posters. The museum rotates its collection through permanent exhibits on Polish poster art and history, foreign poster art, and thematic exhibits.

The oldest poster in the collection is a chromolithograph of 1892 advertising the Vistula steam navigation company of Maurycy Fajans, printed at the Warsaw lithographic works of his brother Maksymilian Fajans.

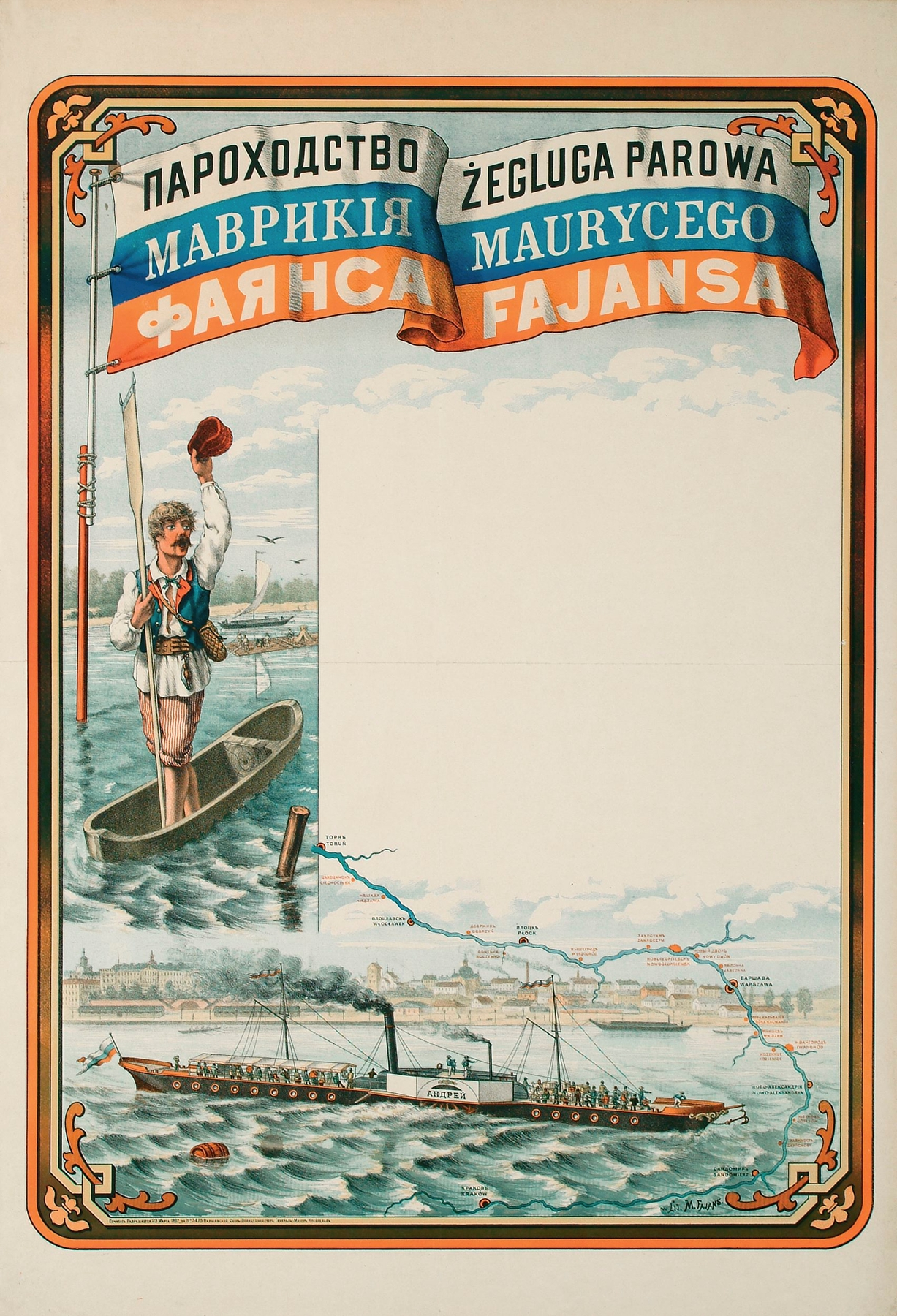
The oldest poster in the collection, advertising the Vistula steam navigation company of Maurycy Fajans, 1892

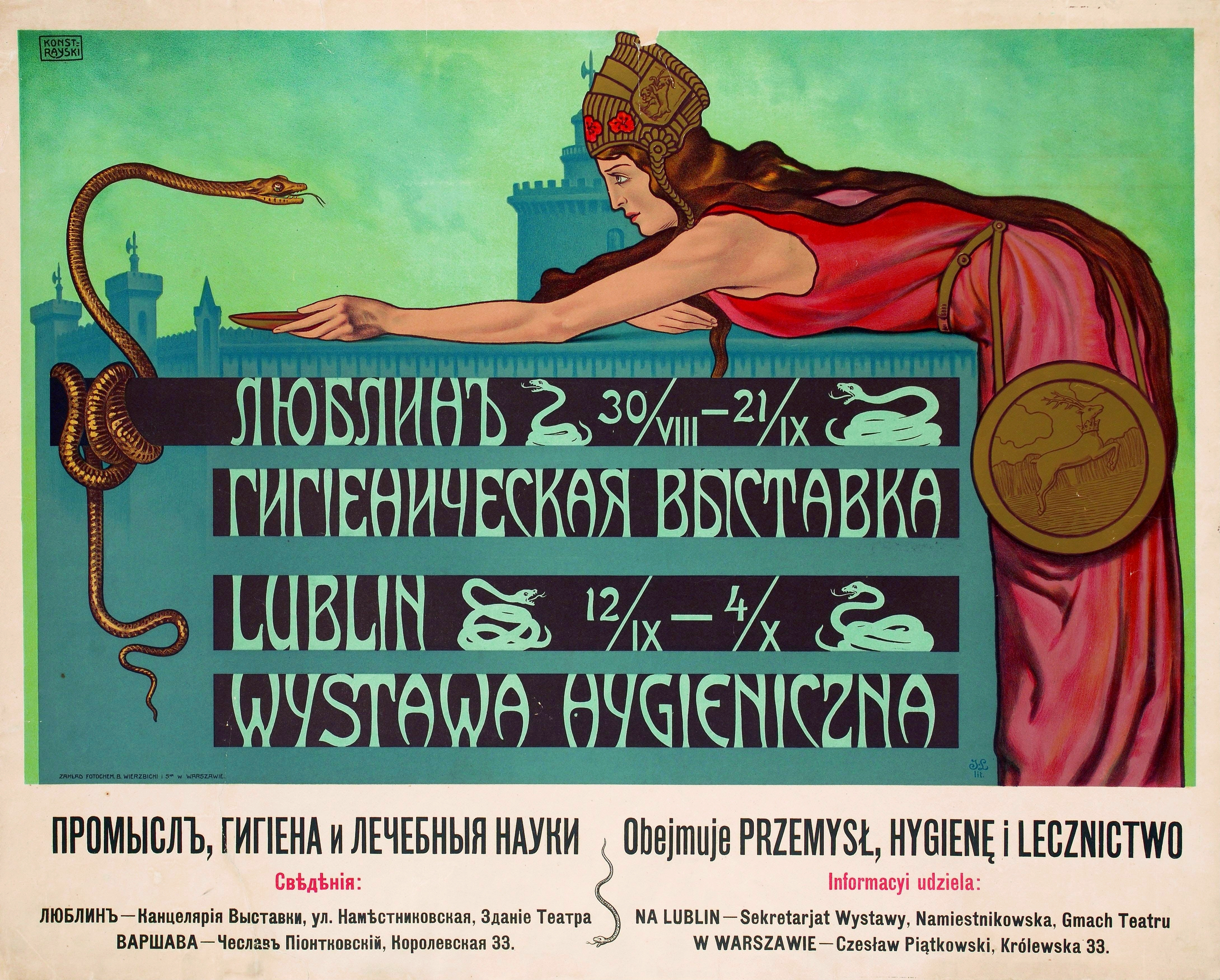
Poster for the Hygienic Exhibition in Lublin by Konstanty Kietlicz-Rayski from 1908

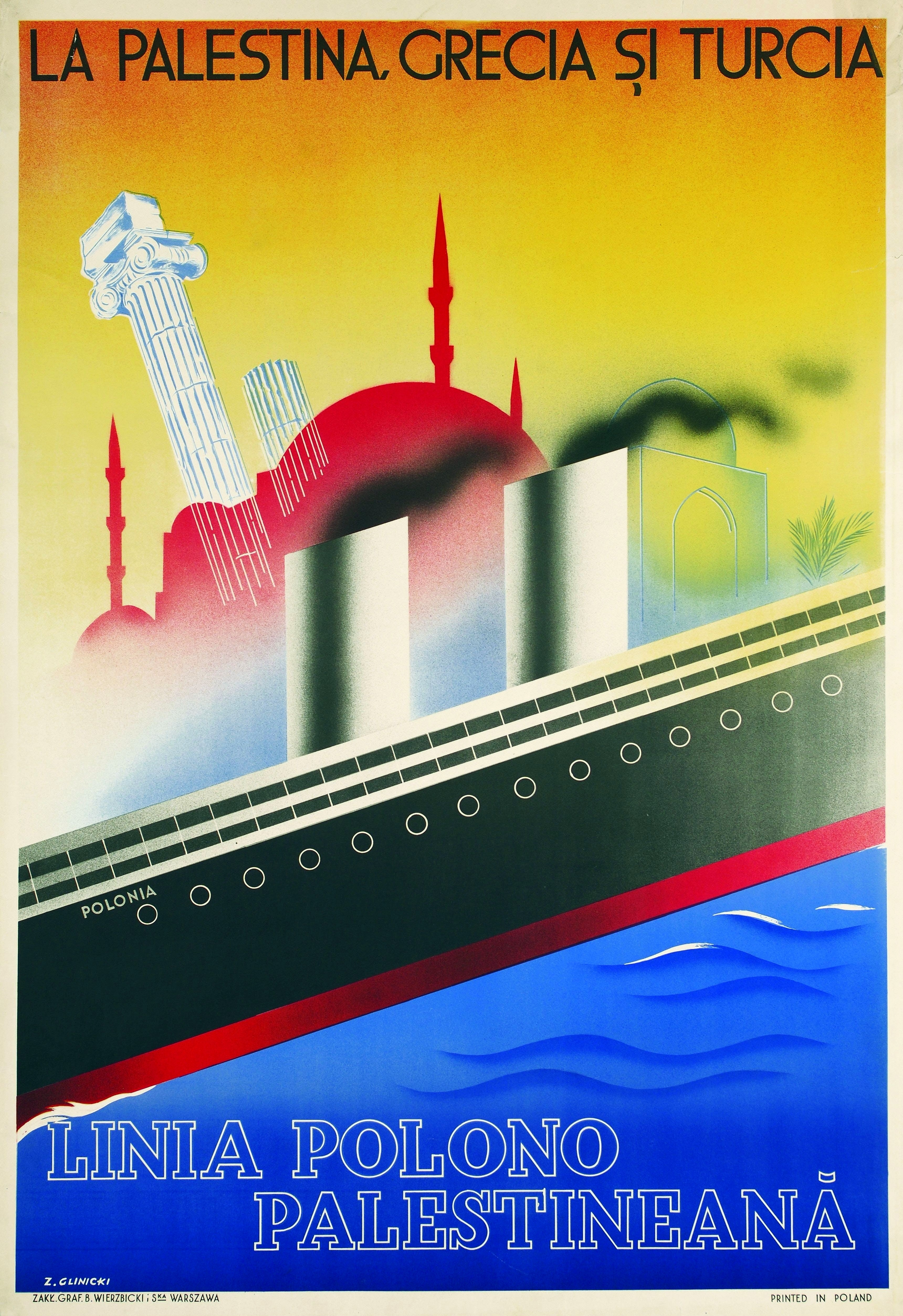
Polish-Palestinian Line by Zygmunt Glinicki

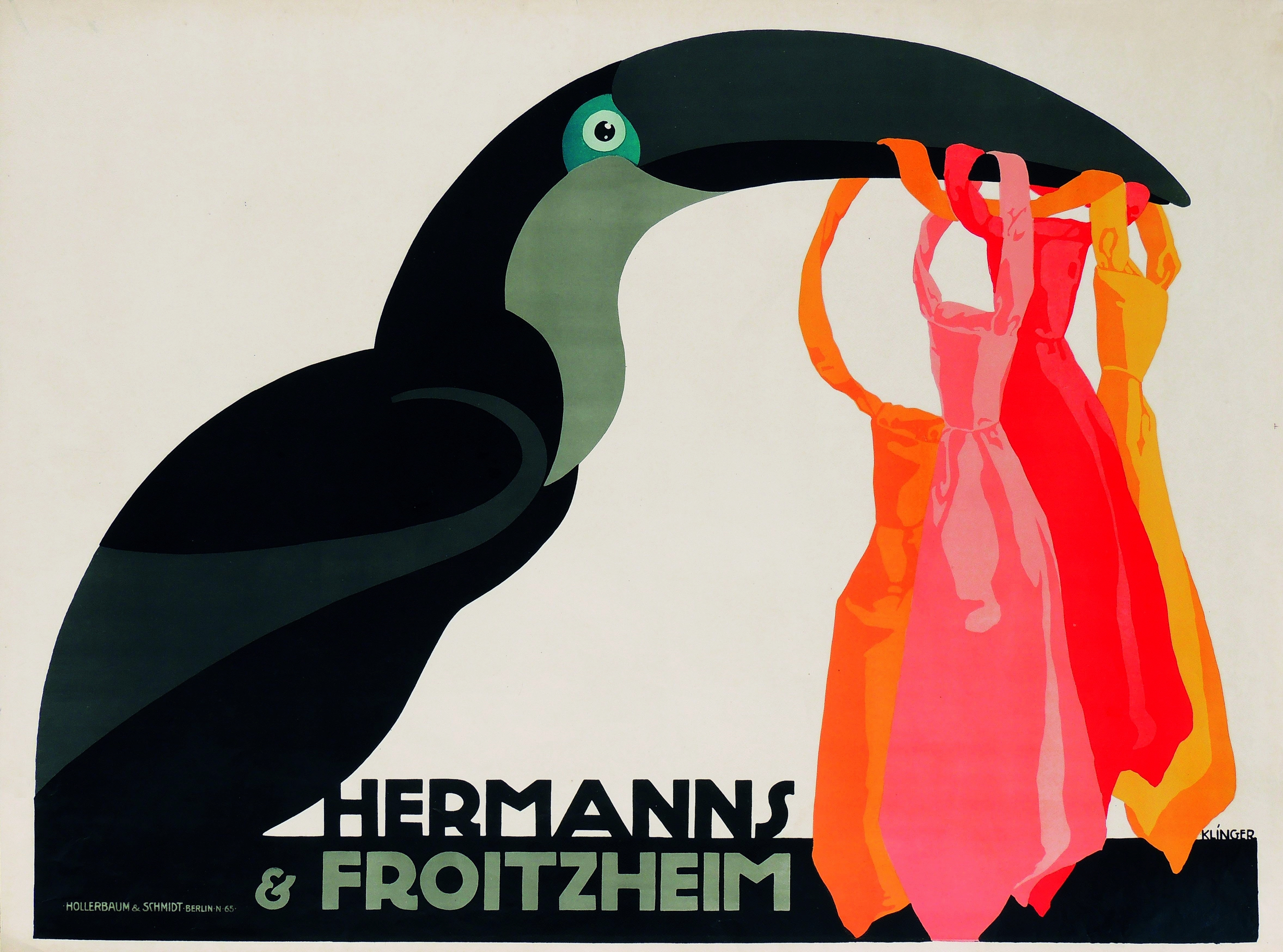
Hermanns & Froitzheim by Julius Klinger

== International Poster Biennale in Warsaw ==
The International Poster Biennale in Warsaw, which was launched in 1966, moved to the museum in 1994, where it is still held biannually. The International Poster Biennale was the world's first poster biennale. Today, it attracts more than 2000 entries from around the globe when it is held.

In 2016, on the occasion of the 50th Anniversary of International Poster Biennale, 25th IPBW invited fifty eminent artists to take part in the exhibition 50/50/50. Their work reproduced in the form of digital print in city light boxes situated in Warsaw. Participants in the exhibition included Michel Bouvet, Milton Glaser, Harmen Liemburg, Finn Nygaard, fr:Kari Piippo, Paula Scher, Niklaus Troxler, and Catherine Zask amongst others.

== See also ==
- Books on posters
- Graphic design
- Illustrations
- Mediascape
- Pin-up (disambiguation)
- Polish School of Posters
- Poster session
- Street Poster Art
- Swann Galleries
