= Henryk Tomaszewski (poster artist) =

Polish poster artist (1914–2005)

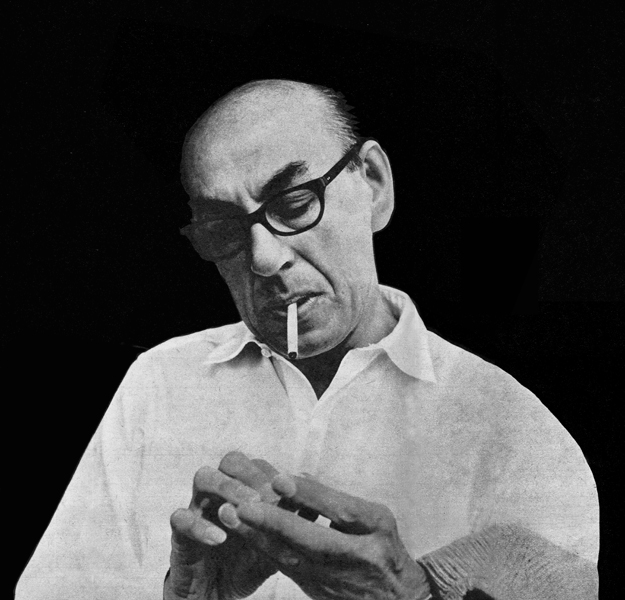
- Born: June 10, 1914; Warsaw, Warsaw Governorate, Congress Poland
- Died: September 11, 2005 (aged 91); Warsaw, Masovian Voivodeship, Poland
- Occupation: Graphic designer
- Known for: Poster design

Henryk Tomaszewski (Note: /tɒməˈʃɛvski/ tom-a-SHEV-ski; Polish pronunciation: [ˈxɛnrɨk tɔmaˈʂɛfskʲi]) (June 10, 1914 – September 11, 2005) was a Polish poster artist and the "father" of the Polish Poster School. In the late 1940s the approach he took eluded both the Soviet Socialist realism of the day, and the conventions of Western Bloc advertising. His work marked the beginning of conceptual poster design in postwar Poland.

Further to the posters he made was his outsized contribution to design education. When Tomaszewski became a lecturer at Academy of Fine Arts in Warsaw he influenced the development of successive waves of designers across three decades. Importantly, his teaching went beyond depictive technique, to foster the intellect befitting a competent creative practitioner.

== Biography ==
Henryk Tomaszewski was born in Warsaw, Poland on June 10, 1914, to a family of musicians.

In 1934, he enrolled in the Warsaw Academy of Fine Arts and graduated in 1939. During World War II and the Nazi occupation of Poland, Tomaszewski earned a living through his painting, drawings, and woodcuts which were later destroyed during the Warsaw Uprising. In 1947, he began creating posters for state-run film distribution agency Central Wynajmu Filmów with fellow designers Tadeusz Trepkowski and Tadeusz Gronowski. Postwar shortages of supplies made Tomaszewski rework film posters and introduced bold colors, abstract shapes, and filmmaking techniques to convey the film's mood rather than rely on portraits of the film's stars. He also created posters for the circus and art exhibitions, among others. His poster designs were animated and witty, leading him to become the "father" of the Polish Poster School in the postwar era influencing international poster designers. His work was also part of the painting event in the art competition at the 1948 Summer Olympics.

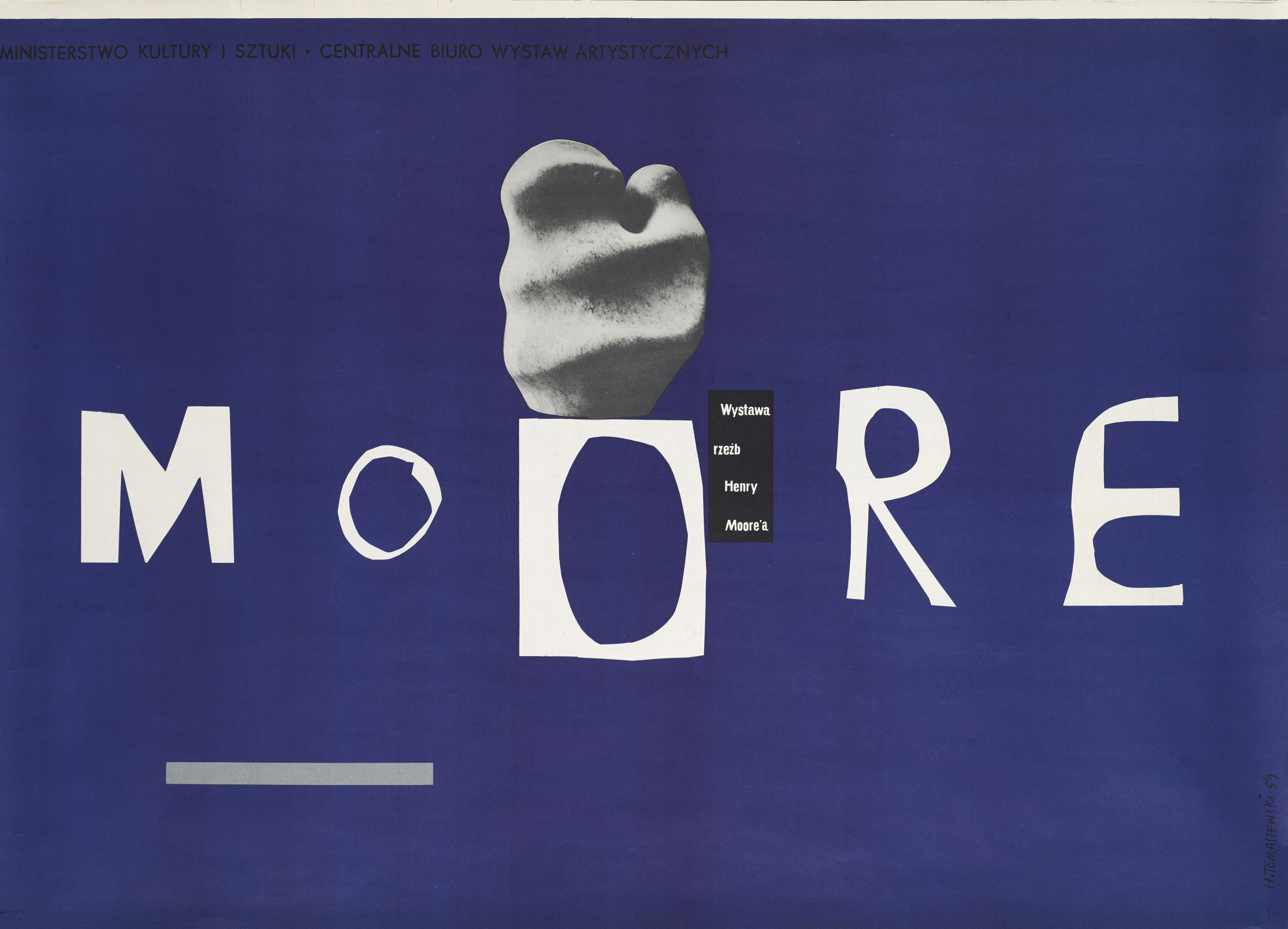
Poster announcing a Henry Moore exhibition, 1959, by Henryk Tomaszewski

He became a professor from 1952 until 1985 at the Warsaw Academy of Fine Arts.

In 1975 Henryk Tomaszewski was granted the title of Honorary Royal Designer for Industry by Royal Society of Arts in London and since 1957 was a member of Alliance Graphique International (AGI).

Tomaszewski was the father of acclaimed contemporary Polish graphic artist Filip Pagowski.

He died on September 11, 2005, in Warsaw, Poland of progressive nerve degeneration.

== Major awards ==
- 1948 - Five Golds Medals, International Poster Exhibition, Vienna (Austria)
- 1963 - First Prize, International Biennal of Arts, São Paulo (Brazil)
- 1965 - Gold Medal, Leipzig (DDR)
- 1966 - Silver Medal, International Poster Biennal, Warsaw (Poland)
- 1967 - Gold Medal, National Polish Poster Biennal, Katowice (Poland)
- 1970 - Gold Medal, International Poster Biennal, Warsaw (Poland)
- 1975 - Silver Medal, National Polish Poster Biennal, Katowice (Poland)
- 1975 - HonRDI, Royal Designers for Industry
- 1979 - First Prize, 3rd Poster Biennale, Lahti (Finland)
- 1981 - First Prize, International Poster Exhibition, Fort Collins (USA)
- 1986 - Excellence Award, ICOGRADA
- 1988 - Silver and gold medals, International Poster Biennal, Warsaw (Poland)
- 1991 - Bronze Medal, International Poster Triennial, Toyama (Japan)
- 1994 - Silver Medal, International Poster Triennial, Toyama (Japan)
- 1994 - Bronze Medal, International Poster Biennal, Warsaw (Poland)

== See also ==
- Graphic design
- List of graphic designers
- List of Polish painters
- List of Polish graphic designers
- Stanislaw Zagórski
