= Mieczysław =

- Pronunciation: Polish: [mjɛˈt͡ʂɘ.swaf]
- Gender: masculine
- Language: Polish

Origin
- Origin: Slavic
- Derivation: miecz ("sword"), sława ("glory, fame")
- Meaning: "glory of the sword" "famous by the sword"
- Region of origin: Poland

Other names
- Variant form: Mieczysława (f)
- Nicknames: Mietek, Miecio, Mieszko
- Related names: Mečislovas

Mieczysław (Polish: [mjɛˈt͡ʂɘ.swaf]) is a Polish masculine given name. It is composed of the Slavic elements miecz meaning "sword" and sława meaning "glory, fame". It thus means "glory of the sword", "famous by the sword", or "sword bearer".

The feminine form of the name is Mieczysława.

Diminutive forms include Mietek, Miecio and Mieszko. The Lithuanian form of the name is Mečislovas.

== Notable people with the name ==
=== A-J ===
- Mieczysław Adamek (1918–1944), Polish fighter ace
- Mieczysław Aszkiełowicz (born 1957), Polish politician
- Mieczysław Bagiński (born 1944), Polish politician
- Mieczysław Balcer (1906–1995), Polish footballer
- Mieczysław Bareja (1939–2003), Polish judge and politician
- Mieczysław Baryłko (1923–2002), Polish painter
- Mieczysław Batsch (1900–1977), Polish footballer
- Mieczysław Bekker (1905–1989), Polish engineer and professor
- Mieczysław Biernacki 1891–1959), Polish mathematical chemist
- Mieczysław Biskupski (born 1948), Polish-American historian and political scientist
- Mieczysław Boruta-Spiechowicz (1894–1985), Polish military officer
- Mieczysław Broniszewski (born 1948), Polish football manager
- Mieczysław Broński (1882–1938), Russian-Polish communist, diplomat and academic
- Mieczysław Burda (1916–1990), Polish ice hockey player
- Mieczysław Centnerszwer (1874–1944), Polish chemist and university professor
- Mieczysław Chmura (1934–1980), Polish ice hockey player
- Mieczysław Cieniuch (born 1951), Polish military general
- Mieczysław Cieślar (1950–2010), Polish Lutheran theologian and bishop
- Mieczysław Cybulski (1903–1984), Polish actor
- Mieczysław Cygan (1921–2006), Polish military commander
- Mieczysław Czajkowski (1898–1972), Polish footballer
- Mieczysław Czechowicz (1930–1991), Polish actor
- Mieczysław Dębicki (1905–1977), Polish engineer and a car designer
- Mieczysław Detyniecki (born 1938), Polish artist
- Mieczysław Długoborski (1931–2020), Polish middle-distance runner
- Mieczysław Domaradzki (1949–1998), Polish archaeologist and thracologist
- Mieczysław Dziemieszkiewicz (1925–1951), Polish soldier
- Mieczysław Fogg (1901–1990), Polish singer
- Mieczysław Garsztka (1896–1919), Polish aviator and flying ace
- Mieczysław Gębarowicz (1893–1984), Polish art historian
- Mieczysław Gil (1944–2022), Polish trade unionist and politician
- Mieczysław Gocuł (born 1963), Polish military general
- Mieczysław Golba (born 1966), Polish politician
- Mieczysław Górowski (1941–2011), Polish graphic artist
- Mieczysław Gracz (1919–1991), Polish footballer
- Mieczyslaw Gruber (1913–2006), Polish-American soldier
- Mieczysław Grydzewski (1894–1970), Polish historian and journalist
- Mieczysław Gutkowski (1893–1943), Polish lawyer and economist
- Mieczysław Haiman (1888–1949), Polish-American journalist and historian
- Mieczysław Halka Ledóchowski (1822–1902), Polish cardinal
- Mieczysław Hertz (1870–1943), Polish merchant, historian and writer
- Mieczysław Horszowski (1892–1993), Polish-American pianist
- Mieczysław Hryniewicz (born 1949), Polish actor
- Mieczysław Jagielski (1924–1997), Polish politician and economist
- Mieczysław Janowski (born 1947), Polish politician
- Mieczysław Jaroński (1862–1922), Polish violin virtuoso
- Mieczysław Jaskierski (born 1950), Polish ice hockey player
- Mieczysław Jastrun (1903–1983), Polish poet and essayist
- Mieczysław Jałowiecki (1876–1962), Polish diplomat and agronomist

=== K-P ===
- Mieczysław Kalenik (1933–2017), Polish actor
- Mieczysław Kapiak (1911–1975), Polish cyclist
- Mieczysław Karaś (1924–1977), Polish linguist
- Mieczysław Karłowicz (1876–1909), Polish composer and conductor
- Mieczysław Karłowicz (cyclist) (born 1963), Polish racing cyclist
- Mieczysław Kasprzak (born 1953), Polish politician
- Mieczysław Kasprzycki 1910–2001), Polish ice hockey player
- Mieczysław Kawalec (1916–1951), Polish resistance fighter
- Mieczysław Klimaszewski (1908–1995), Polish geographer, geomorphologist and politician
- Mieczysław Klimek (1913–1995), Polish engineer and university professor
- Mieczysław Klimowicz (1919–2008), Polish historian
- Mieczysław Kościelniak (1912–1993), Polish painter and graphic designer
- Mieczysław Kosmowski (1913–?), Polish Nazi collaborator, Gestapo agent and war criminal
- Mieczysław Kotlarczyk (1908–1978), Polish actor
- Mieczysław Kozłowski (1876–1927) Polish-Lithuanian diplomat and jurist
- Mieczysław Albert Krąpiec (1921–2008), Polish philosopher and theologian
- Mieczysław Krawicz (1893–1944), Polish film director
- Mieczysław Kwiecień (1936–2020), Polish Protestant clergyman
- Mieczysław Łęczycki (1897–?), Polish architect
- Mieczysław Łomowski (1914–1969), Polish shot putter
- Mieczysław Łopatka (born 1939), Polish basketball player and coach
- Mieczysław Łoza (1916–1982), Polish actor
- Mieczysław Lubelski (1886–1965), Polish sculptor and ceramicist
- Mieczysław Łuczak (born 1955), Polish politician
- Mieczysław Mackiewicz (1880–1954), Polish general
- Mieczysław Mąkosza (born 1934), Polish chemist
- Mieczysław Maliński (1923–2017), Polish Catholic priest, theologian and writer
- Mieczysław Małecki (1903–1946), Polish linguist and university professor
- Mieczysław Maneli (1922–1994), Polish lawyer, diplomat and academic
- Mieczysław Michałowicz (1876–1965), Polish medical doctor
- Mieczysław Mickiewicz (1879–1939), Polish-Ukrainian politician and lawyer
- Mieczysław Moczar (1913–1986), Polish politician
- Mieczysław Mokrzycki (born 1961), Polish Catholic archbishop
- Mieczysław Morański (1960–2020), Polish actor and voice actor
- Mieczysław Mümler (1899–1985), Polish fighter ace
- Mieczysław Munz (1900–1976), Polish-American pianist
- Mieczysław Młynarski (1956–2025), Polish basketball player and coach
- Mieczysław Niedziałkowski (1893–1940), Polish politician and writer
- Mieczysław Norwid-Neugebauer (1884–1954), Polish politician and military general
- Mieczysław Nowak (1936–2006), Polish weightlifter
- Mieczysław Nowicki (born 1951), Polish racing cyclist
- Mieczysław Omyła (born 1941), Polish professor of humanities and philosopher
- Mieczysław Ostojski (born 1954), Polish meteorologist
- Mieczysław Ożóg (born 1966), Polish footballer
- Mieczysław Palus (1921–1986), Polish ice hockey player
- Mieczysław Pawełkiewicz (1938–2007), Polish luger
- Mieczysław Pawlikowski (1920–1978), Polish actor
- Mieczysław Pemper (1920–2011), Polish-German Holocaust survivor and assistant of Oskar Schindler
- Mieczyslaw Pianowski (1890–1967), Polish-American dancer and choreographer
- Mieczysław Połukard (1930–1985), Polish motorcycle speedway rider
- Mieczysław Potocki (1810–1878), Polish landowner and

=== R-Z ===
- Mieczysław Rakowski (1926–2008), Polish politician, historian and journalist
- Mieczysław Romanowski (1833–1863), Polish poet
- Mieczysław Rutyna (born 1931), Polish racewalker
- Mieczysław Rybarczyk 1941–1983), Polish professional tennis player
- Mieczysław Ryś-Trojanowski (1881–1945), Polish military general
- Mieczysław Salomonowicz (1924–2022), Polish-Israeli scientist and immunologist
- Mieczysław Serwiński (1918–1999), Polish politician
- Mieczysław Sikora (born 1982), Polish footballer
- Mieczysław Słaby (1905–1948), Polish military officer and medic
- Mieczysław Słowikowski (1896–1989), Polish army officer
- Mieczysław Smorawiński (1893–1940), Polish military general
- Mieczysław Sołtys (1863–1929), Polish composer and conductor
- Mieczysław Srokowski (1873–1910), Polish writer and poet
- Mieczyslaw Staner (1924–2003), Polish Holocaust survivor and author
- Mieczysław Stoor (1929–1973), Polish film actor
- Mieczysław Strzałka (1947–2024), Polish gymnast
- Mieczyslaw Sudowski (1897–1971), Polish-Australian author
- Mieczysław Szczuka (1898–1927), Polish artist and mountaineer
- Mieczysław Szczurek (1923–1978), Polish footballer
- Mieczysław Szewczyk (born 1962), Polish footballer
- Mieczysław Szostek (1933–2021), Polish doctor and politician
- Mieczysław Szumiec (1907–1993), Polish footballer
- Mieczysław Tarka (1919–1976), Polish footballer
- Mieczysław Tarnawski (1924–1997), Polish actor
- Mieczysław Thugutt (1902–1979), Polish politician
- Mieczysław Tracz (1962–2019), Polish wrestler
- Mieczysław Wachowski (born 1950), Polish politician
- Mieczysław Walkiewicz (born 1949), Polish politician
- Mieczysław Warmus (1918–2007), Polish mathematician and computer scientist
- Mieczysław Wasilewski (born 1942), Polish graphic designer
- Mieczysław Wawrzusiak (1928–1994), Polish footballer
- Mieczysław Waśkowski (1929–2001), Polish actor and film director
- Mieczysław Weinberg (1919–1996), Polish-Russian composer
- Mieczysław Wilczek (1932–2014), Polish politician, chemist, and businessman
- Mieczysław Wilczewski 1932–1993), Polish cyclist
- Mieczysław Wiśniewski (1892–1952), Polish footballer
- Mieczysław Wojczak (born 1951), Polish handball player
- Mieczysław Wolfke (1883–1947), Polish physicist and university professor
- Mieczysław Zdzienicki (1892–1953), Polish social activist and lawyer
- Mieczysław Zub (1953–1985), Polish serial killer
- Mieczysław Żywczyński 1901–1978), Polish historian and priest

=== Second name ===
- Witold Mieczysław Bałażak (born 1964), Polish politician
- Jerzy Mieczysław Chróścikowski (born 1953), Polish politician
- Alfons Mieczysław Chrostowski (c. 1860–1920), Polish author and playwright
- Kamil Mieczysław Grabara (born 1999), Polish professional footballer
- Stefan Mieczysław Grzybowski (1902–2003), Polish law professor
- Henryk Mieczysław Jagodziński (born 1969), Polish Catholic priest
- Władysław Mieczysław Kozłowski (1858–1935), Polish philosopher
- Adam Mieczysław Stachowiak (born 1986), Polish footballer
- Otton Mieczysław Żukowski (1867–1942), Polish composer

=== Mieczysława ===
- Mieczysława Ćwiklińska (1879–1972), Polish film actress, stage actor and singer
- Mieczysława Franczyk (born 1942), Polish rower

== Fictional characters ==
- Mieczysław "Mickey Doyle" Kuzik, character from the television series Boardwalk Empire
- Mieczysław "Stiles" Stilinski, character from the 2011 television series Teen Wolf.
- Mieczysław Wojnicz, the protagonist in Olga Tokarczuk’s 2022 novel, The Empusium.

== See also ==
- Mieszko, a diminutive form of the name
- Mečislovas, Lithuanian form of the name
- Mstislav (given name)
- Polish name
- Slavic names
