= Cyrk (art) =

Polish form of poster art

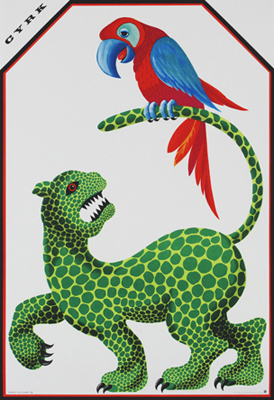
- A cyrk poster by Hubert Hilscher
- Year: 1962
- Medium: Poster
- Movement: Polish School of Posters
- Subject: The circus

Cyrk are a style of contemporary Polish circus posters, which emerged in 1962 as a genre of the Polish School of Posters. They are characterized by their display of aesthetic qualities such as painterly gestures, linear design, hand-lettering, metaphors, humor, and vibrant colors. Usually based on a single theme and meant to be advertisements; they were created in an attempt to interest the passerby in the upcoming circus. Several Polish painters contributed to establishing the art style, among them Henryk Tomaszewski.

== Cyrk poster artists ==
Waldemar Świerzy
Henryk Tomaszewski
Jan Lenica
Boguslaw Lustyk
Tadeusz Jodlowski
Jan Sawka
Rafał Olbiński
Andrzej Pagowski
Wiesław Wałkuski
Mieczyslaw Gorowski
Wiesław Wałkuski
Maciej Urbaniec
Franciszek Starowieyski
Roman Cieślewicz
Stasys Eidrigevicius
Hubert Hilscher
