= Tarnawsky =

Tarnawsky, Tarnawski or Tarnavsky (Russian: Тарнавский, Ukrainian: Тарнавський) is a Slavic masculine surname. Its feminine counterpart is Tarnawska, Tarnavska or Tarnavskaya. It may refer to:

Men

- Angus Tarnawsky, Australian musician
- Mieczysław Tarnawski (1924–1997), Polish film and stage actor
- Myron Tarnavsky (1869–1938), supreme commander of the Ukrainian Galician Army
- Oleksandr Tarnavskyi (born 1970), Ukrainian brigadier general
- Vladimiro Tarnawsky (born 1939), Ukrainian-born Argentine football goalkeeper
- Yuriy Tarnawsky (1934–2025), Ukrainian-American poet, writer and linguist

Women

- Joanna Tarnawska (born 1976), Polish diplomat
- Rosalia Tarnavska (1932–2020), Ukrainian poet

== See also ==
- Tarnowski
