= Barilko =

Barilko or Barylko (Ukrainian: Барілко) is a gender-neutral Ukrainian surname that may refer to:

- Bill Barilko (1927–1951), Canadian ice hockey player
- Mieczysław Baryłko (1923–2002), Polish painter
- Serhiy Barylko (born 1987), Ukrainian football midfielder
- Volodymyr Barilko (born 1994), Ukrainian football striker, brother of Serhiy
- Barilko (horse), 2006 winner of the Colin Stakes
