= Cieślar =

Cieślar (Polish pronunciation: [ˈtɕɛɕlar]) and Cieślarz ([ˈtɕɛɕlaʂ]) are occupational surnames literally meaning 'carpenter'. It may refer to:

- Adam Cieślar (born 1992), Polish Nordic combined skier
- Mieczysław Cieślar (1950–2010), Lutheran theologian and bishop of the Evangelical Augsburg Church in Poland
- Zdeněk Cieslar (born 1973), Czech footballer
- Zuzanna Cieślar (born 2000), Polish fencer
