= Mečislovas =

- Gender: masculine
- Language: Lithuanian

Origin
- Origin: Slavic
- Derivation: mečĭ ("sword"), slava ("glory, fame")
- Meaning: "glory of the sword" "famous by the sword"
- Region of origin: Lithuania

Other names
- Variant form: Mečislova (f)
- Short form: Mečys
- Related names: Mieczysław

Mečislovas is a Lithuanian masculine given name of Slavic origin. It is composed of the Slavic elements mečĭ meaning "sword" and slava meaning "glory, fame". It thus means "glory of the sword", "famous by the sword", or "sword bearer".

The feminine form of the name is Mečislova. The Polish form of the name is Mieczysław. The name is sometimes shortened to Mečys.

== Notable people with the name ==
- Mečislovas Birmanas (1900–1950), Lithuanian chess player
- Mečislovas Bulaka (1907–1994), Lithuanian set designer
- Mečislovas Davainis-Silvestraitis (1849–1919), Lithuanian journalist and publicist
- Mečislovas Gedvilas (1901–1981), Lithuanian Communist politician
- Mečislovas Jučas (1926–2017), Lithuanian historian
- Mečislovas Jurevičius (1927–1999), Lithuanian resistance activist and Servant of God
- Mečislovas Kviklys (1902–1942), Lithuanian educator
- Mečislovas Kymantas (1920–1998), Lithuanian singer
- Mečislovas Leškys-Leškevičius (1911–1959), Lithuanian pianist
- Mečislovas Mackevičius (1906–2003), Lithuanian lawyer and activist
- Mečislovas Mariūnas (born 1940), Lithuanian mechanical engineer
- Mečislovas Navickas (born 1938), Lithuanian choir director
- Mečislovas Leonardas Paliulionis (1834–1908), Lithuanian Roman Catholic bishop
- Mečislovas Reinys (1884–1953), Lithuanian Roman Catholic archbishop and professor
- Mečislovas Treinys (1941–2008), Lithuanian political scientist and economist
- Mečislovas Vasiliauskas (1877–1957), Lithuanian scholar
- Mečislovas Zasčiurinskas (born 1946), Lithuanian economist and bureaucrat

== See also ==
- Mieczysław, Polish form of the name
