= Lutheran Diocese of Warsaw =

Diocese of Warsaw Diecezja warszawska
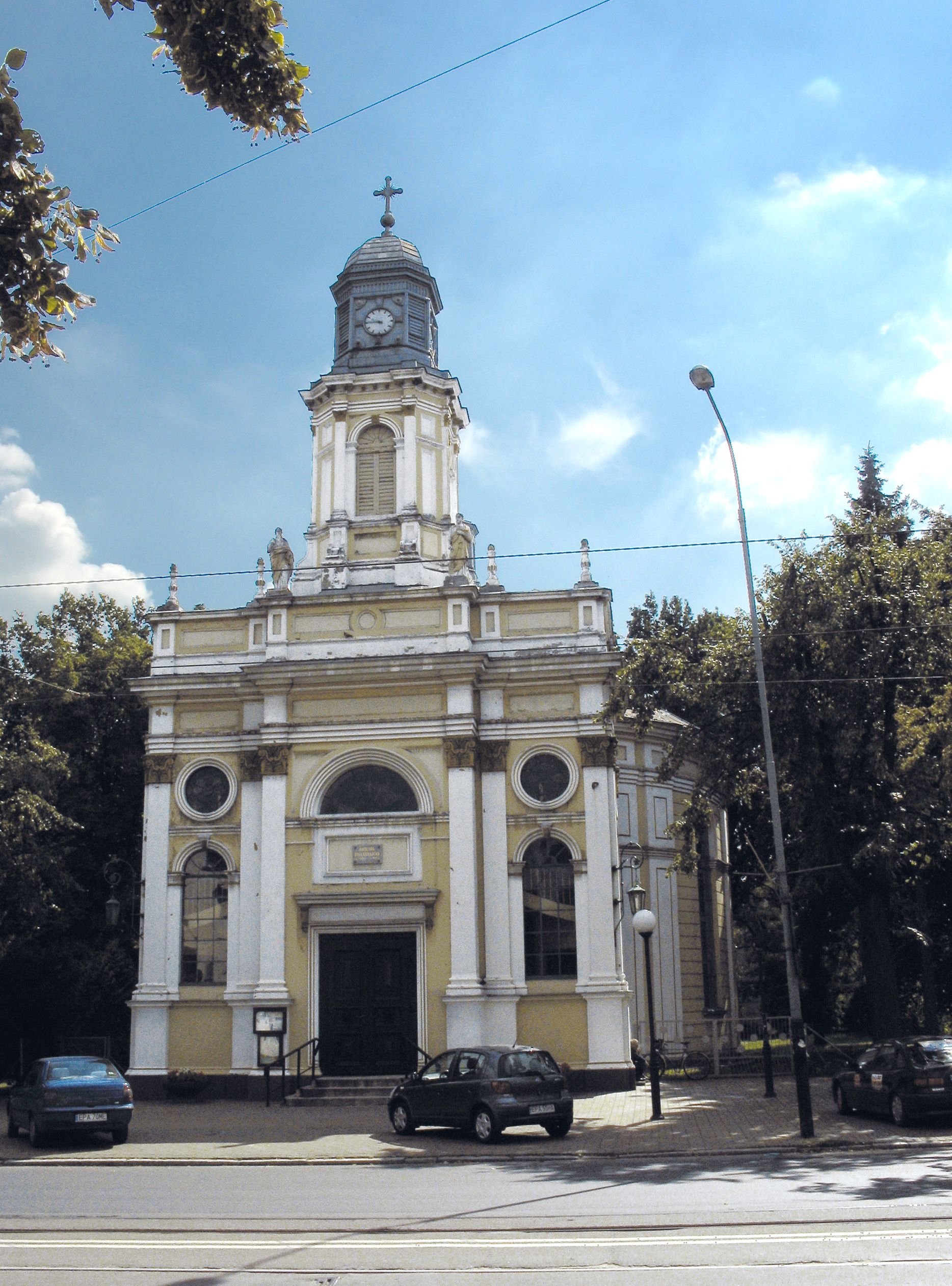
- Church of Saint Peter and Saint Paul in Pabianice

Location
- Country: Poland
- Headquarters: Pabianice

Statistics
- Parishes: 21
- Congregations: 29
- Members: 3968
- Denomination: Evangelical Church of the Augsburg Confession in Poland

Current leadership
- Bishop: Jan Cieślar

The Lutheran Diocese of Warsaw is one of the six dioceses of the Evangelical Church of the Augsburg Confession in Poland (Poland's only Lutheran church), covering most of central and eastern Poland. The Lutheran population in the area in 2016 was 3968, which amounts to about 7% of the total number of adherents of the church in Poland. There were 18 ordained ministers in the diocese in 2016.

== Structure ==
The Lutheran Diocese of Warsaw has 21 parishes: 6 in Masovian Voivodeship (two parishes in Warsaw, one in Radom, Płock, Żyrardów and Węgrów), 14 in Łódź Voivodeship (in Łódź, Piotrków Trybunalski, Pabianice, Tomaszów Mazowiecki, Zgierz, Kutno, Zduńska Wola, Wieluń, Aleksandrów Łódzki, Ozorków, Łask, Rawa Mazowiecka, Zelów, Poddębice) and 1 in Lublin Voivodeship (in Lublin). The diocese also covers the area of Świętokrzyskie Voivodeship, and although there are no independent parishes in the area, church services are held in the regional capital, Kielce, in a filial church that is administratively part of the parish in Radom. The seat of the bishop is the Church of St. Peter and St. Paul in Pabianice.

== History ==
The territorial division of the Diocese of Warsaw as affirmed by the presidential decree of 1936 included 17 parishes, including two in the city of Warsaw itself. In 1939 the Lutheran population of the diocese was 49,405, of which 61.8% were German and 38.2% Polish. Although the total figure was ten times larger than the current numbers, the area of the diocese was significantly smaller than it is nowadays. With separate dioceses in Płock, Lublin, Piotrków and Łódź, the bishop of Warsaw in the Second Polish Republic was responsible for a far smaller area than is currently the case.

The diocese of Warsaw was re-established in the new territorial division of the church following World War II. The dissolution of the diocese of Łódź in 1952 gave it its present shape.

Number of adherents in the Lutheran diocese of Warsaw in the 21st century
Year	2005	2009	2011	2012	2014	2015	2016
Adherents	5,500	4,955	3,902	3,951	3,976	4,005	3,968

Number of adherents in the Lutheran diocese of Warsaw in the 20th century
Year	1923	1939	1955	1960	1965	1970	1975	1980	1985	1990	1995	2000
Adherents	54,371	49,405	15,192	13,248	9,612	7,148	5,287	4,860	5,892	5,136	6,010	6,100

== List of bishops ==
- Woldemar Gastpary : 1954~1957
  - Vacant (1957~1966)
- Ryszard Trenkler : 1966~1979
- Jan Walter : 1979~1995
- Mieczysław Cieślar : 1996~2010
- Jan Cieślar : 2010~

== Churches in the Diocese of Warsaw ==
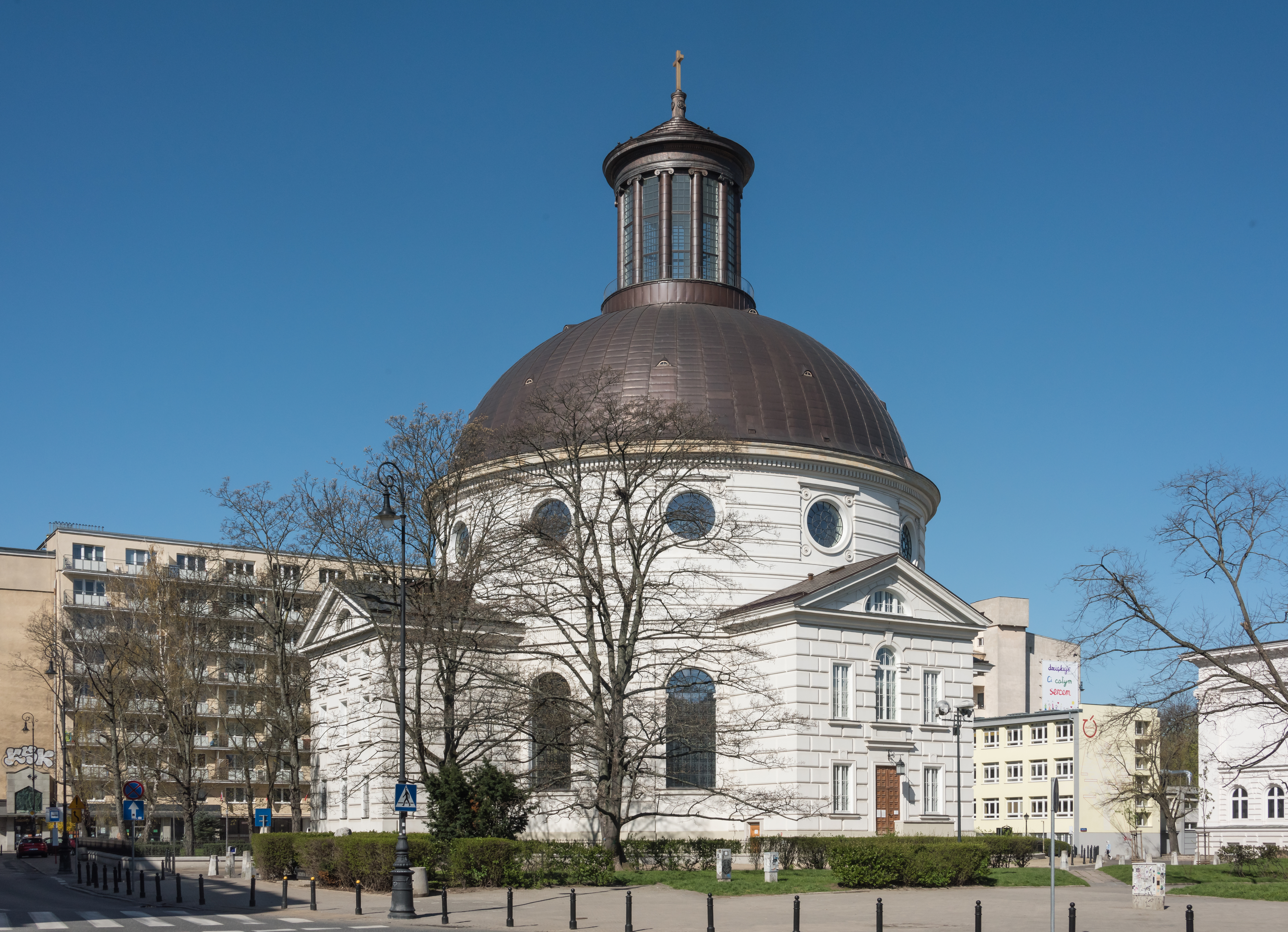
Holy Trinity Church, Warsaw

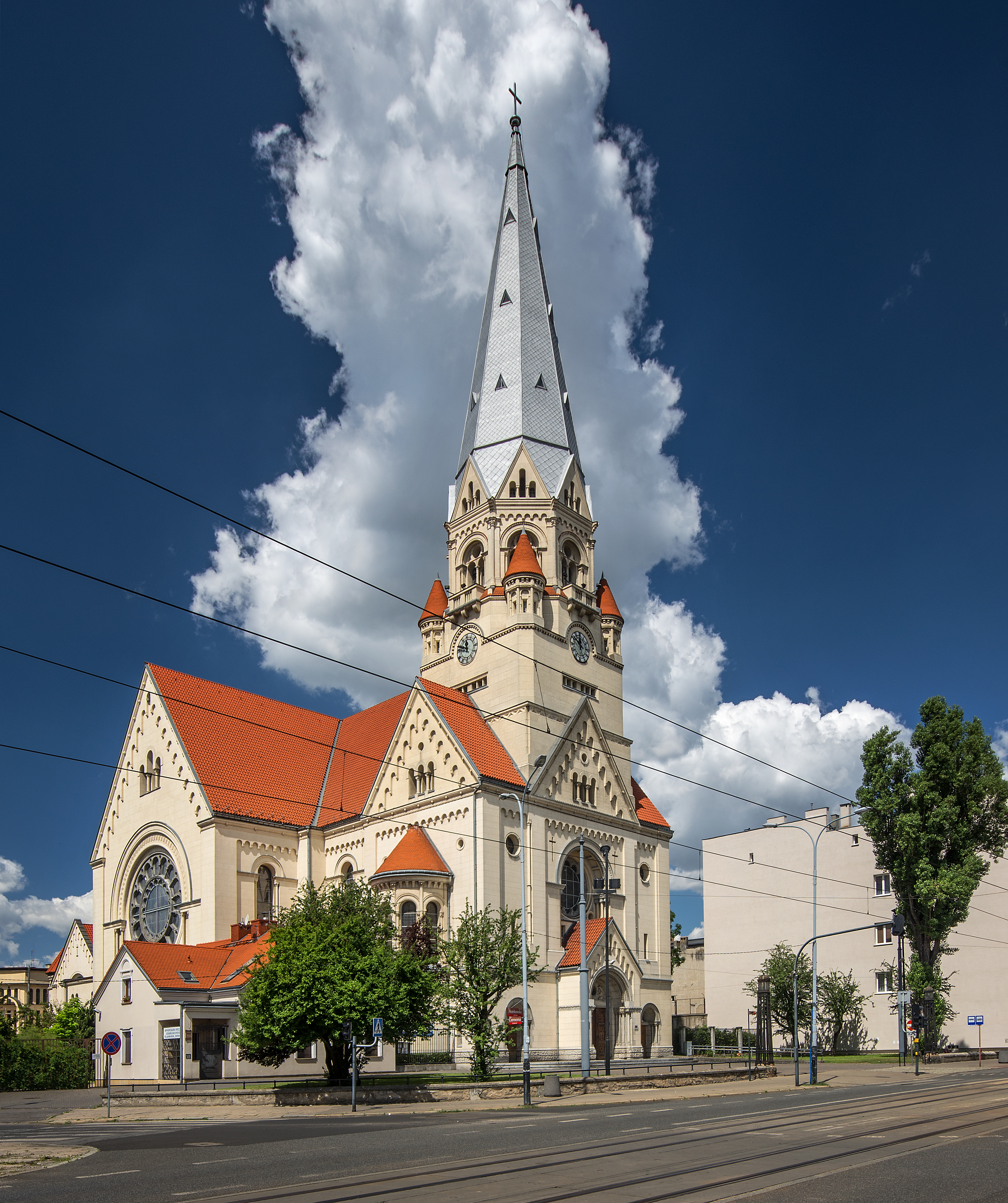
St. Matthew's Church, Łódź

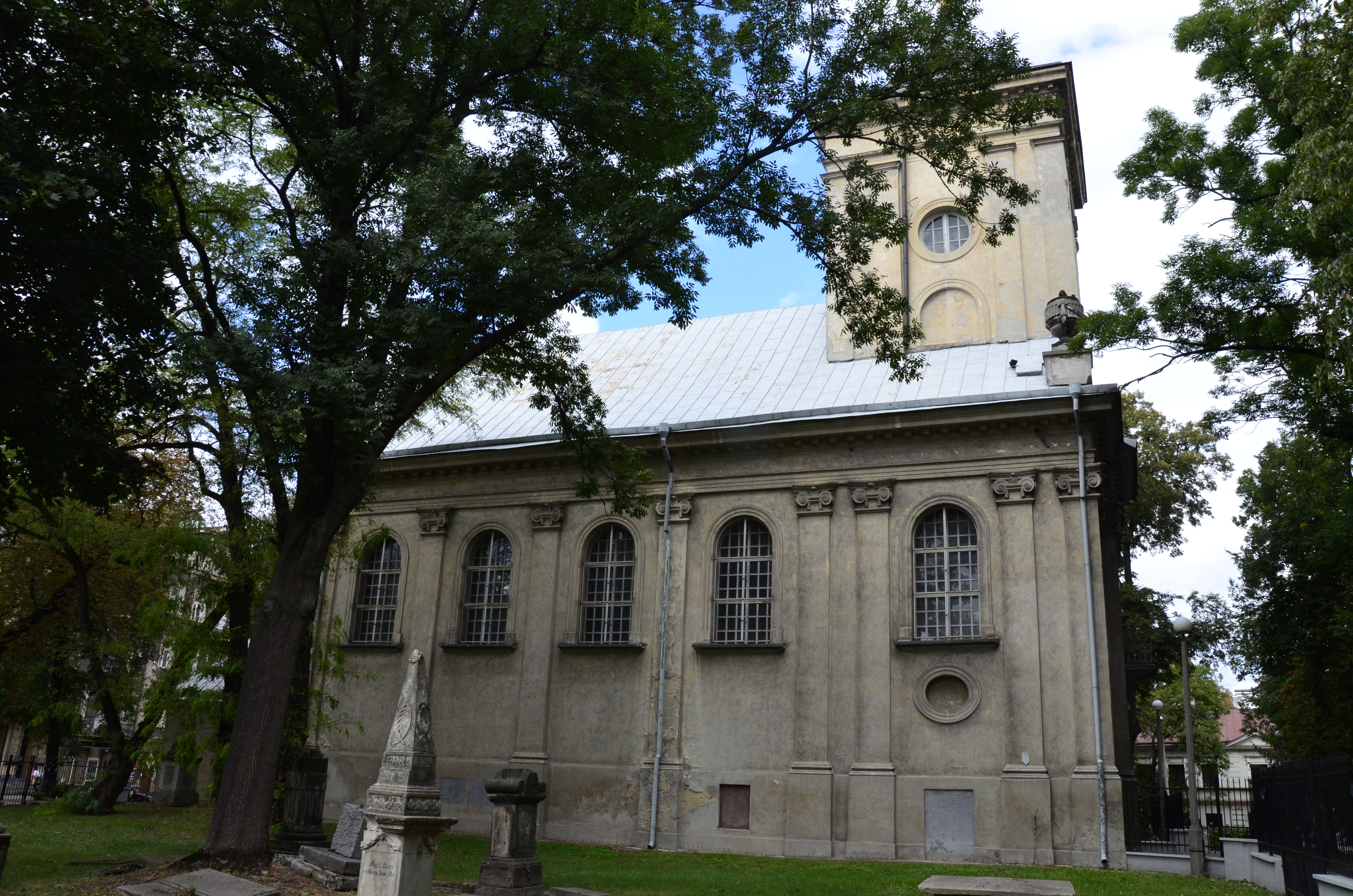
Holy Trinity Church, Lublin

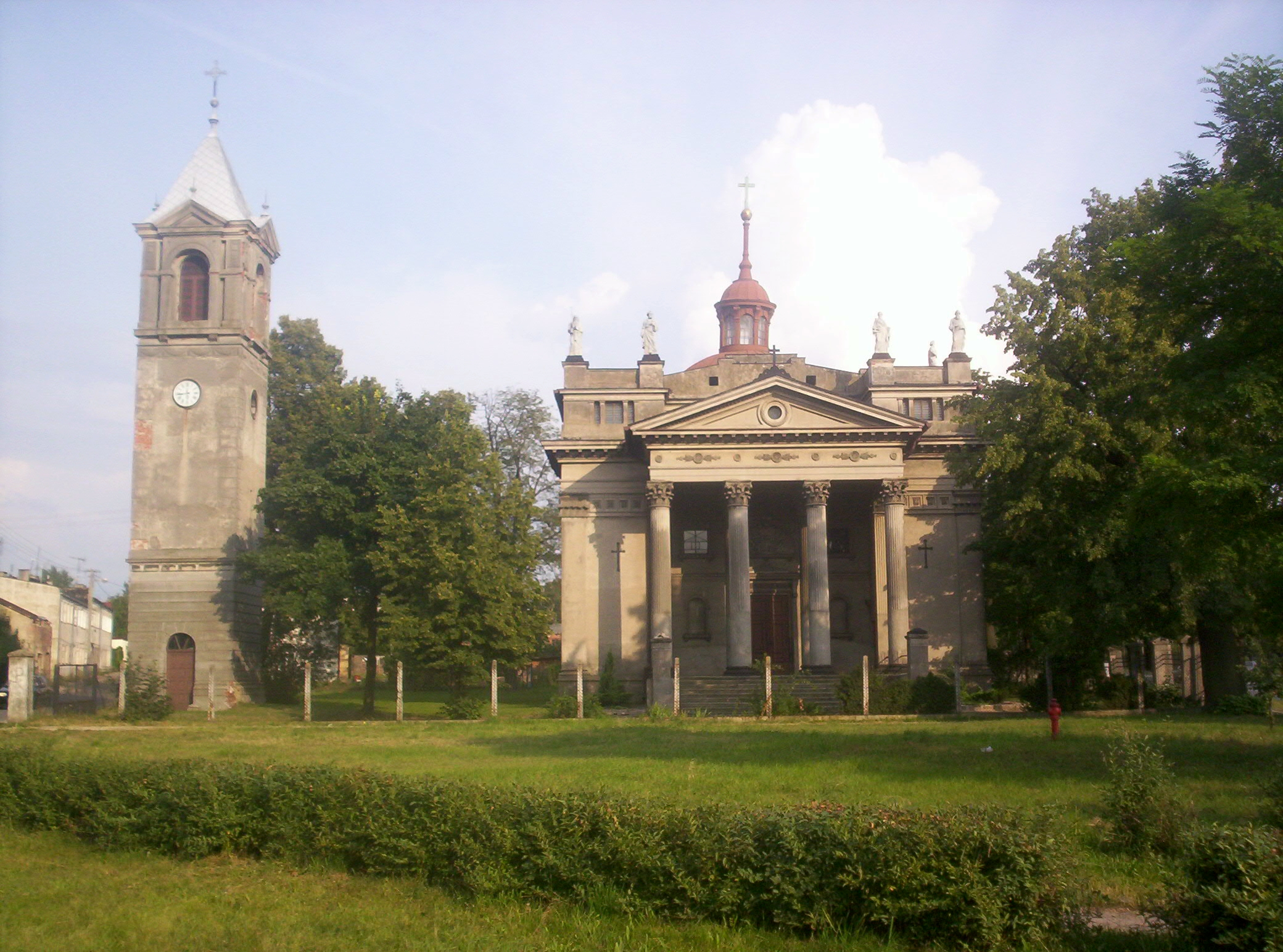
Lutheran church in Ozorków

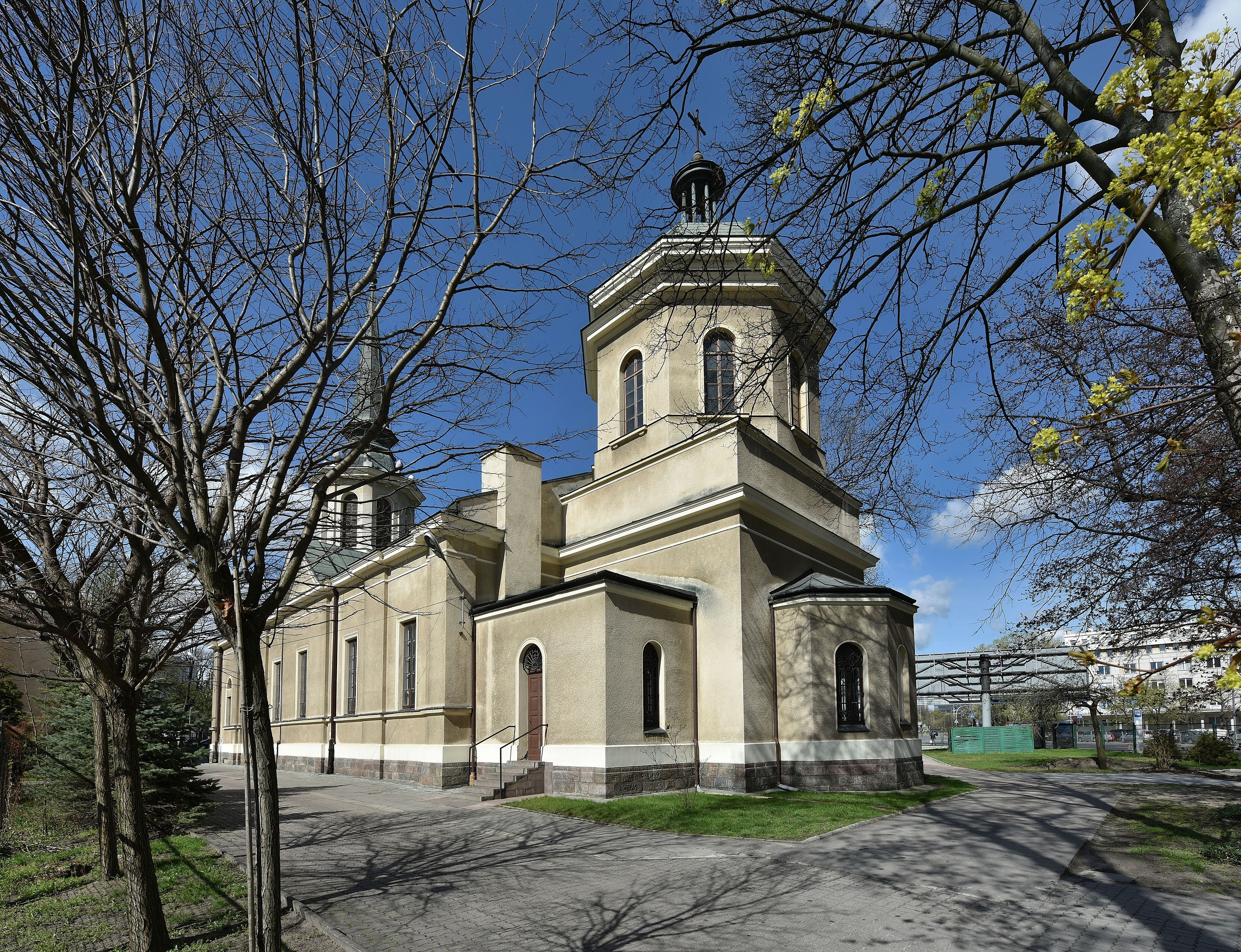
Church of the Ascension, Warsaw

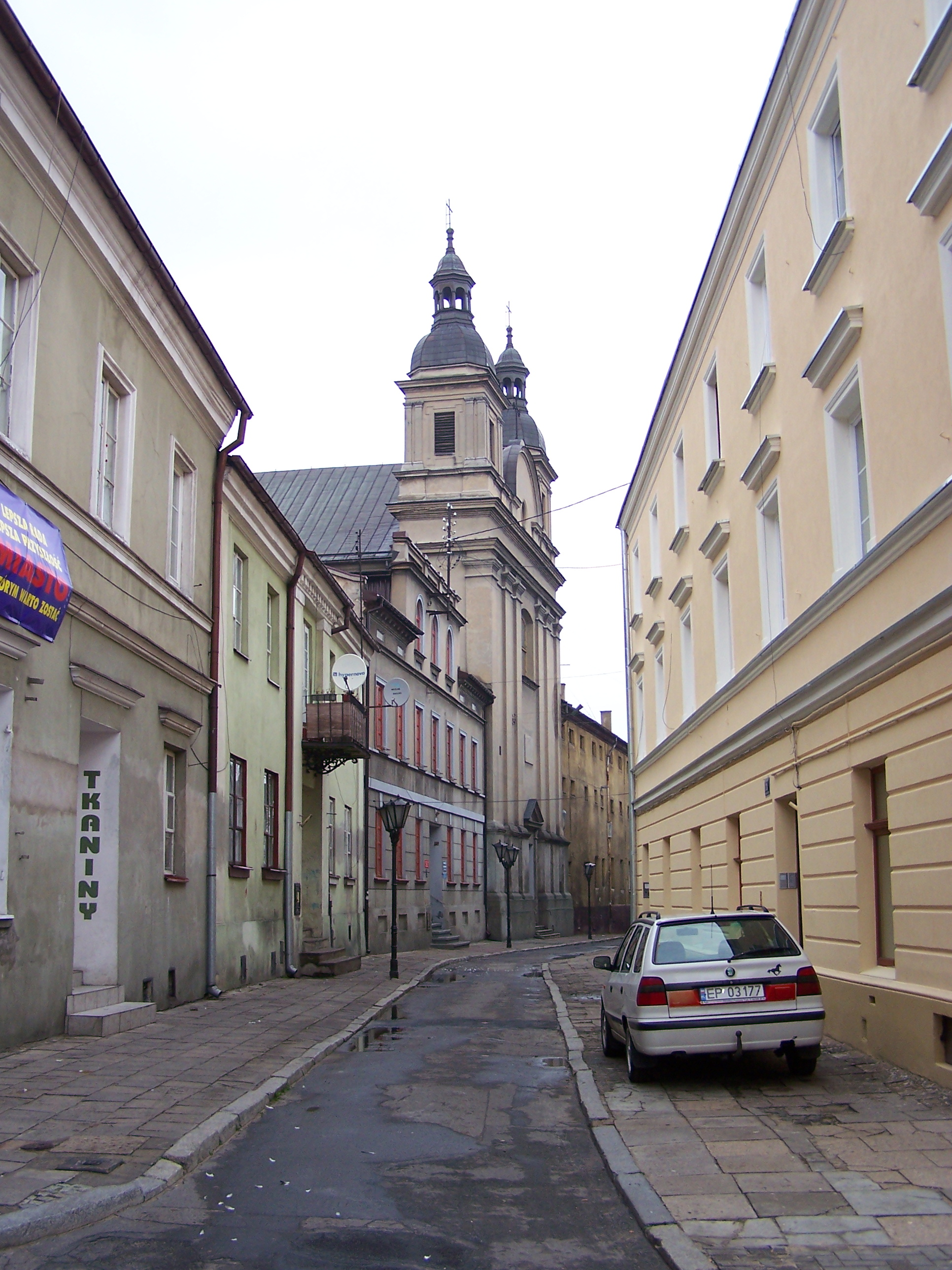
Lutheran church in Piotrków Trybunalski

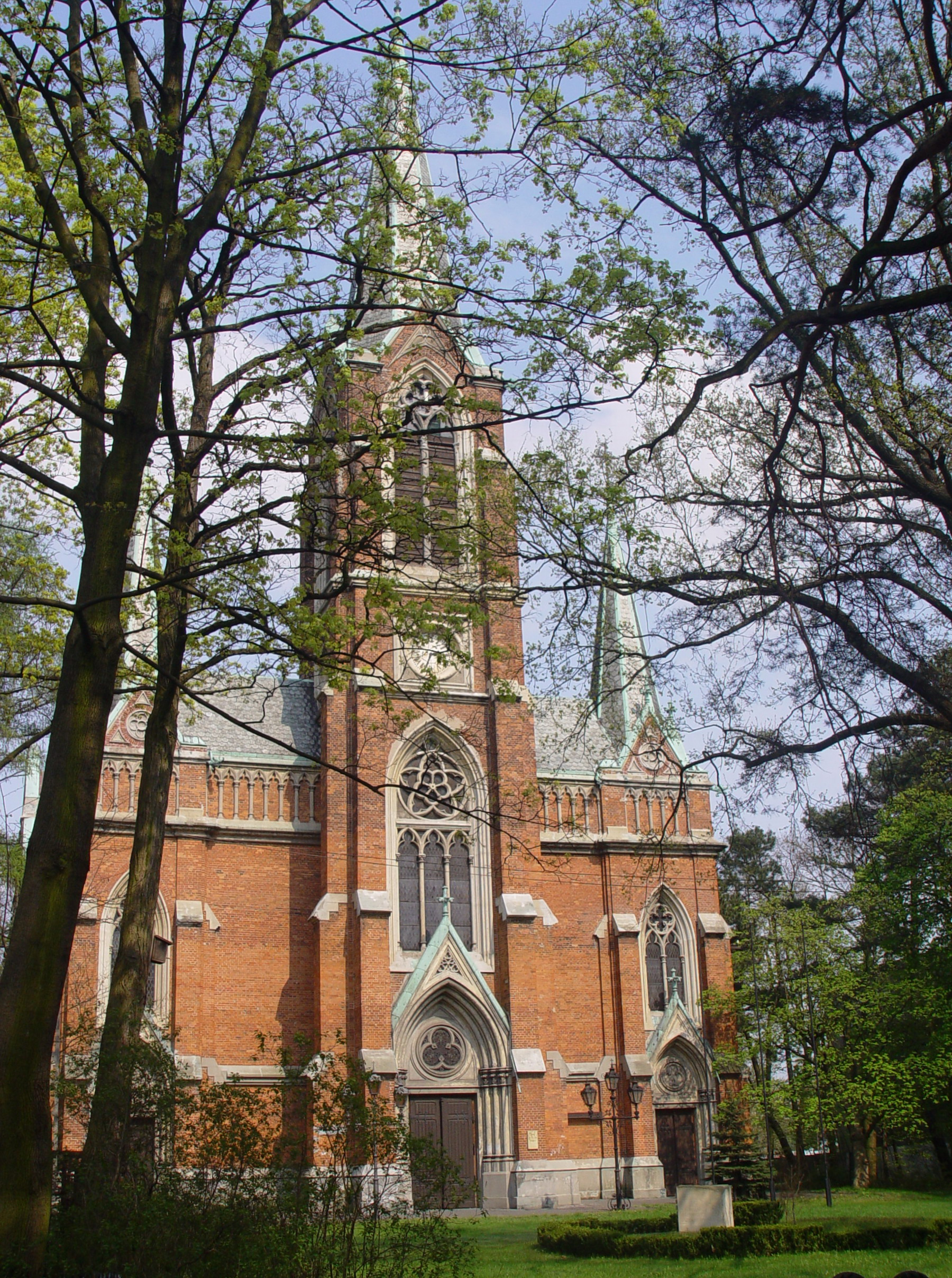
Church of the Saviour, Tomaszów Mazowiecki

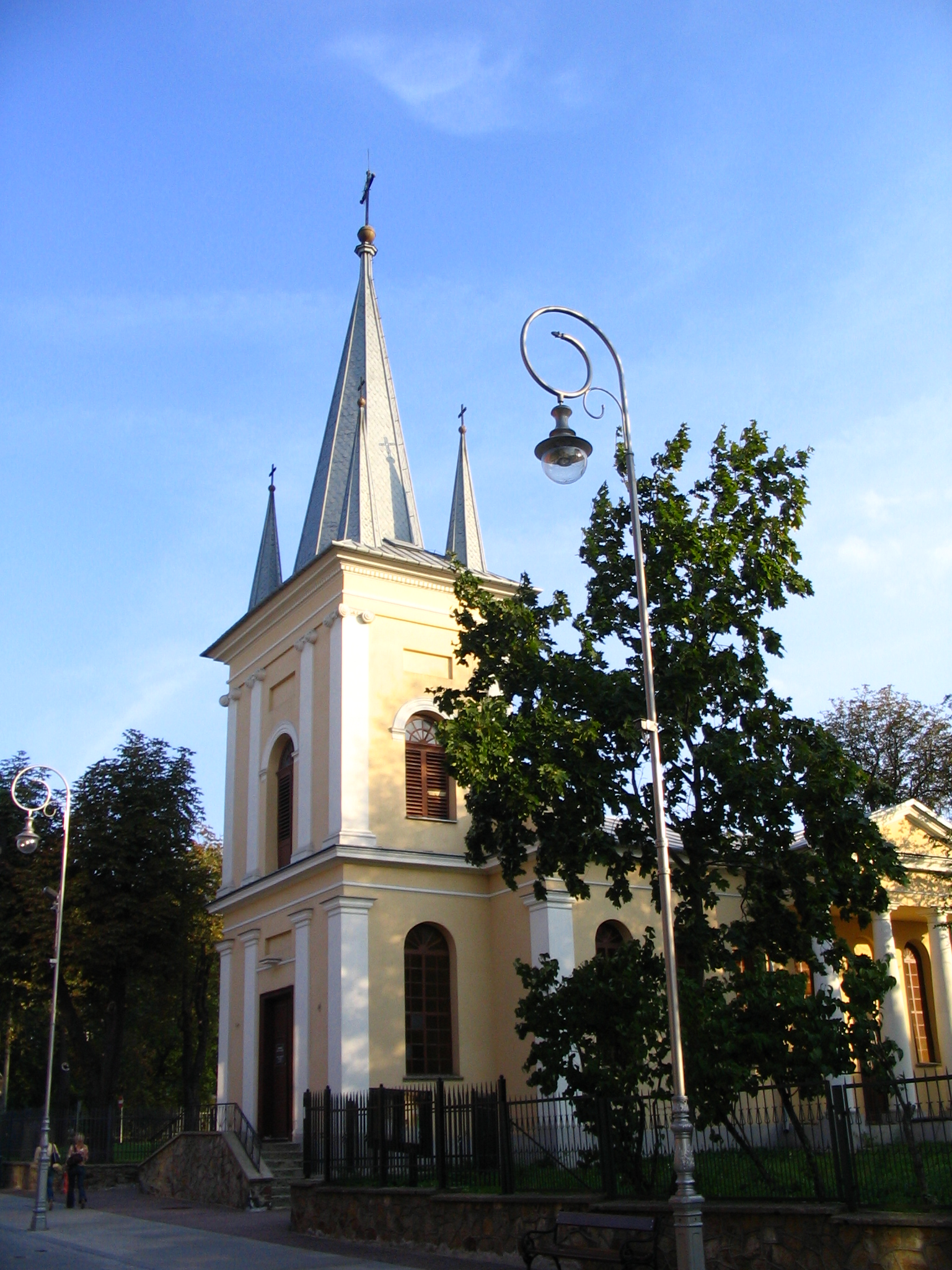
Holy Trinity Church, Kielce

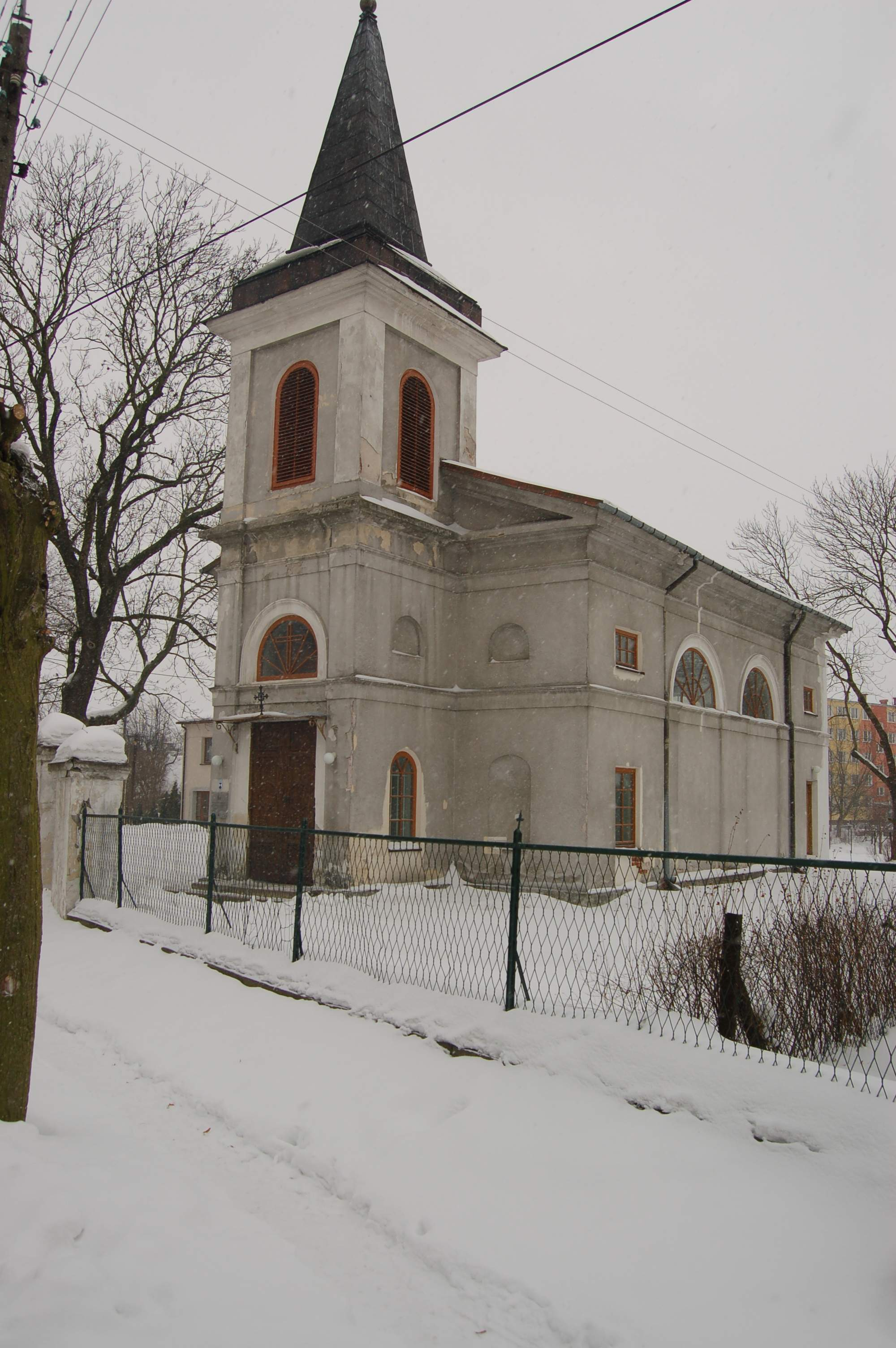
Lutheran church in Węgrów

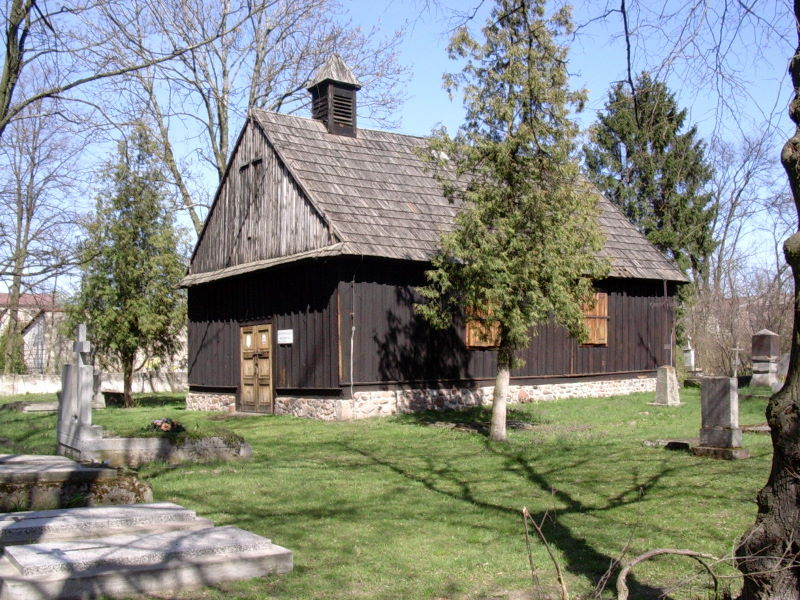
Seventeenth-century Lutheran church at Węgrów cemetery

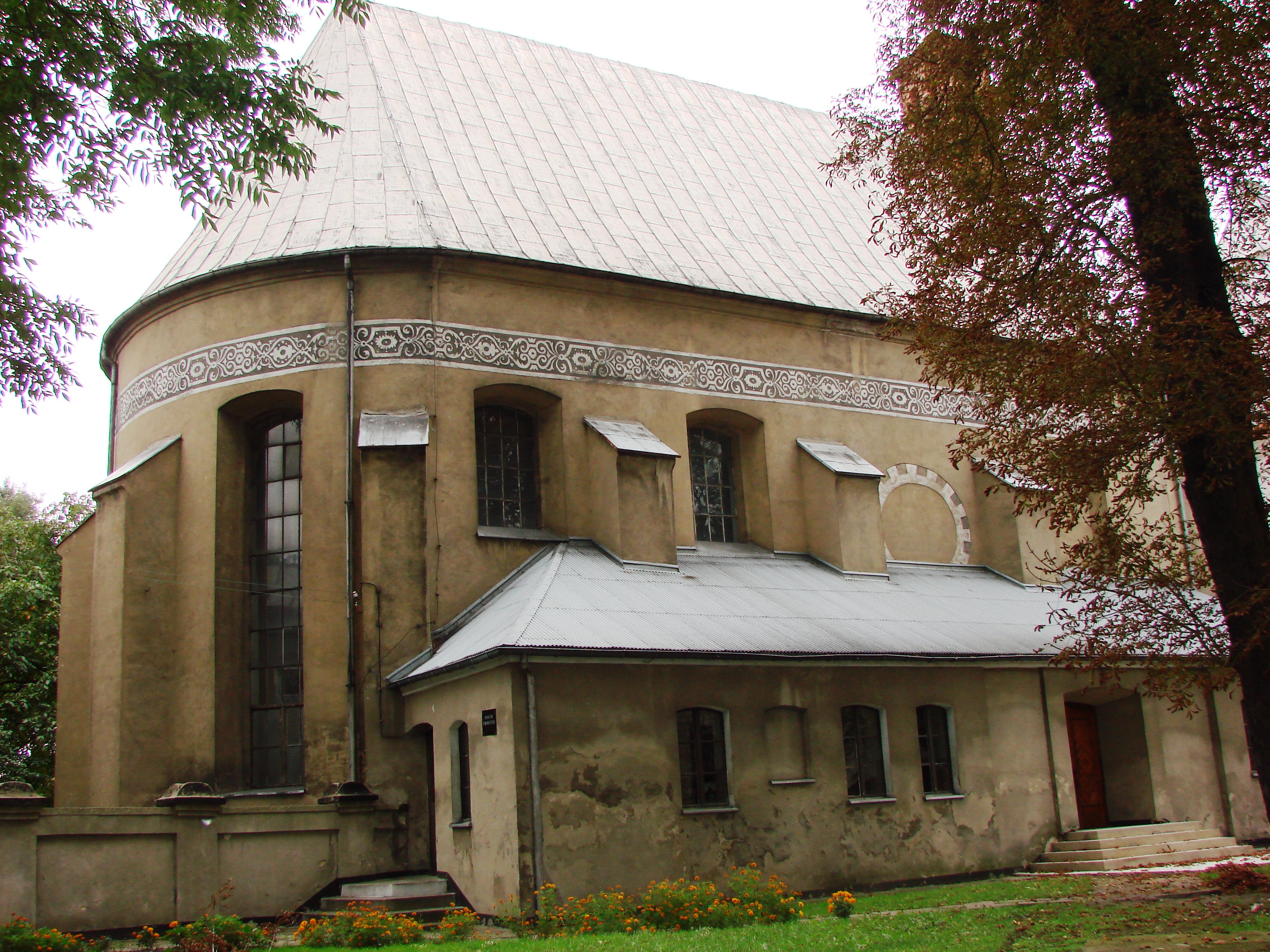
Lutheran church in Wieluń

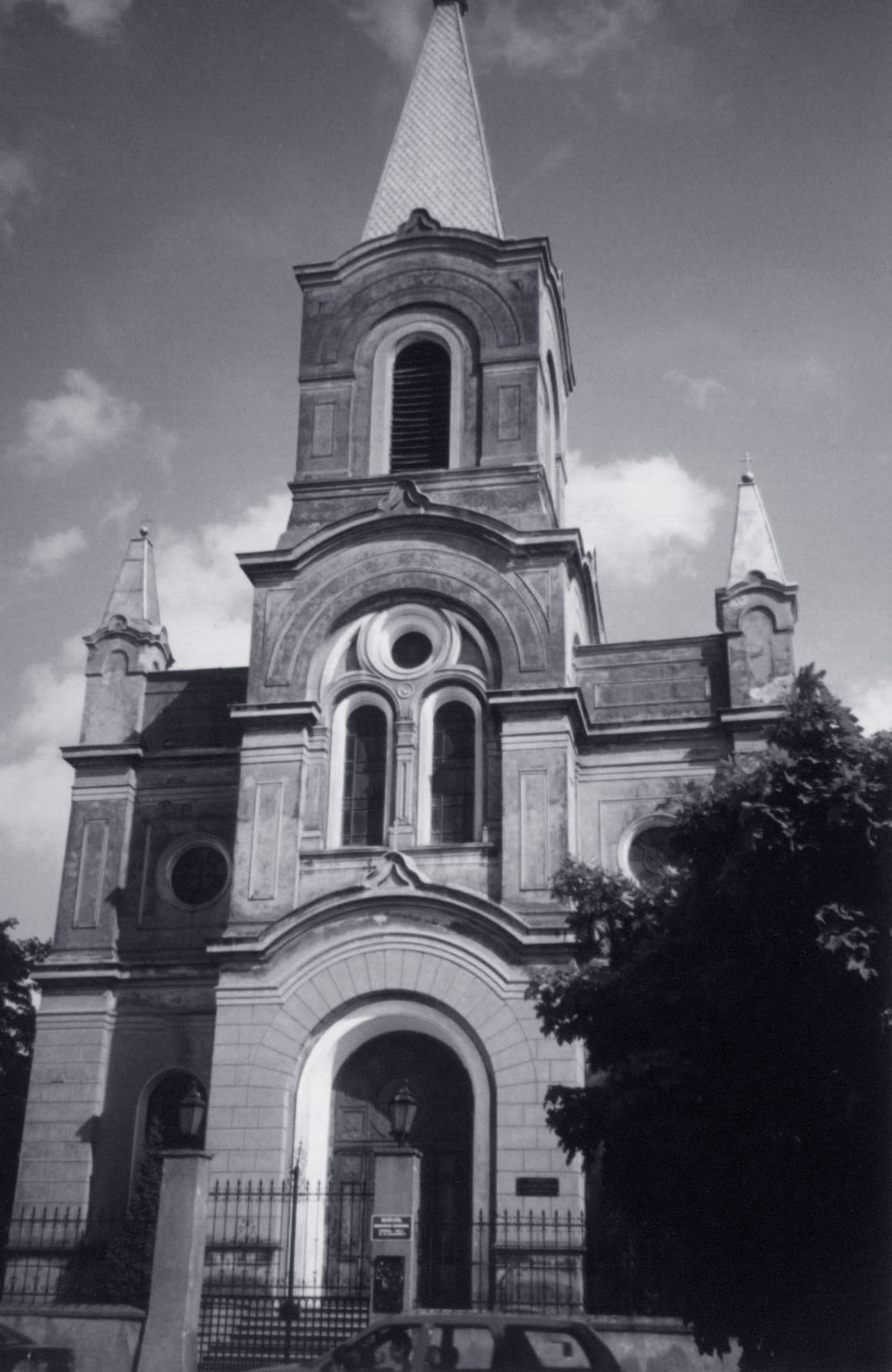
Lutheran church in Zduńska Wola

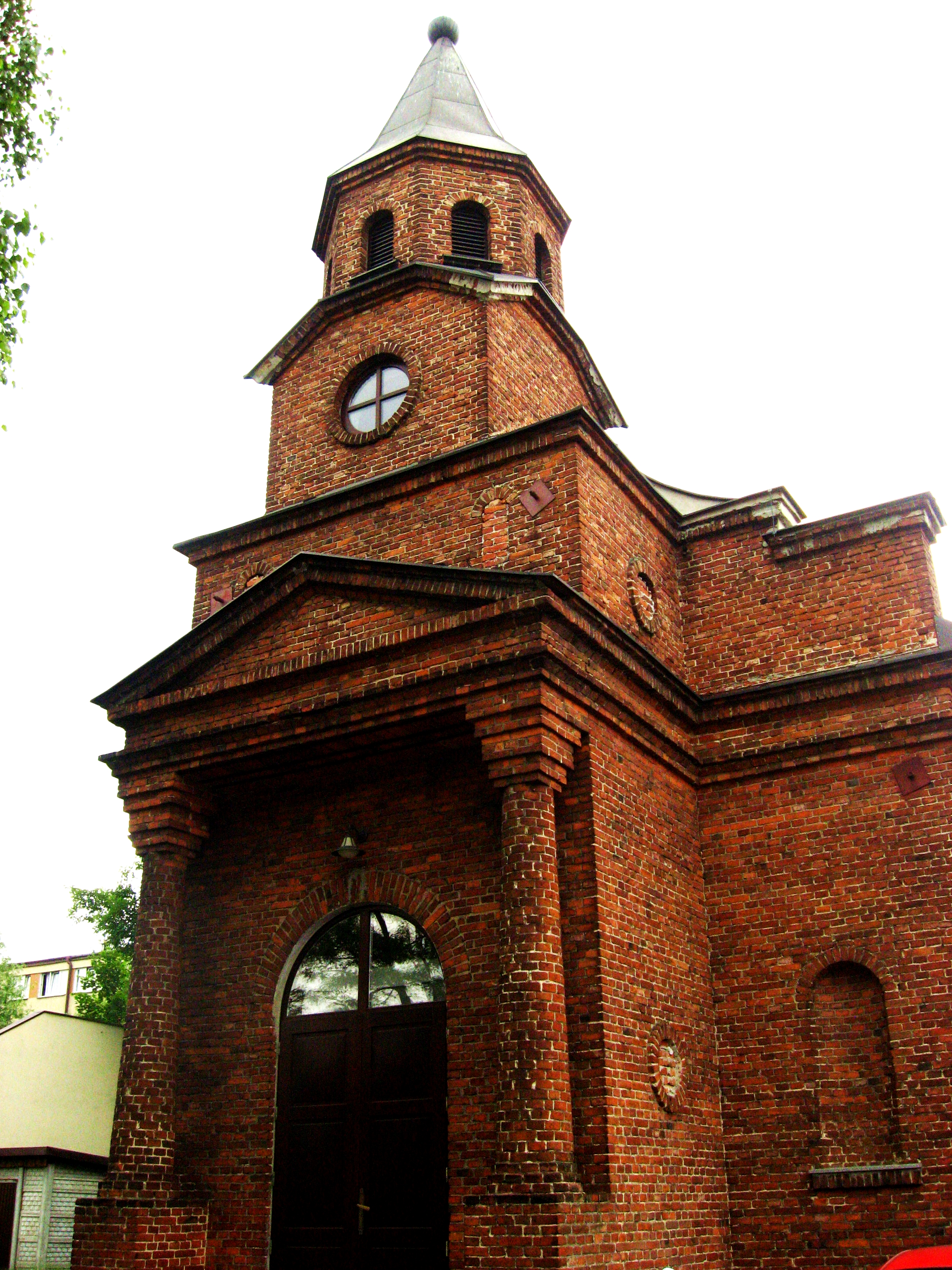
Lutheran church in Zelów

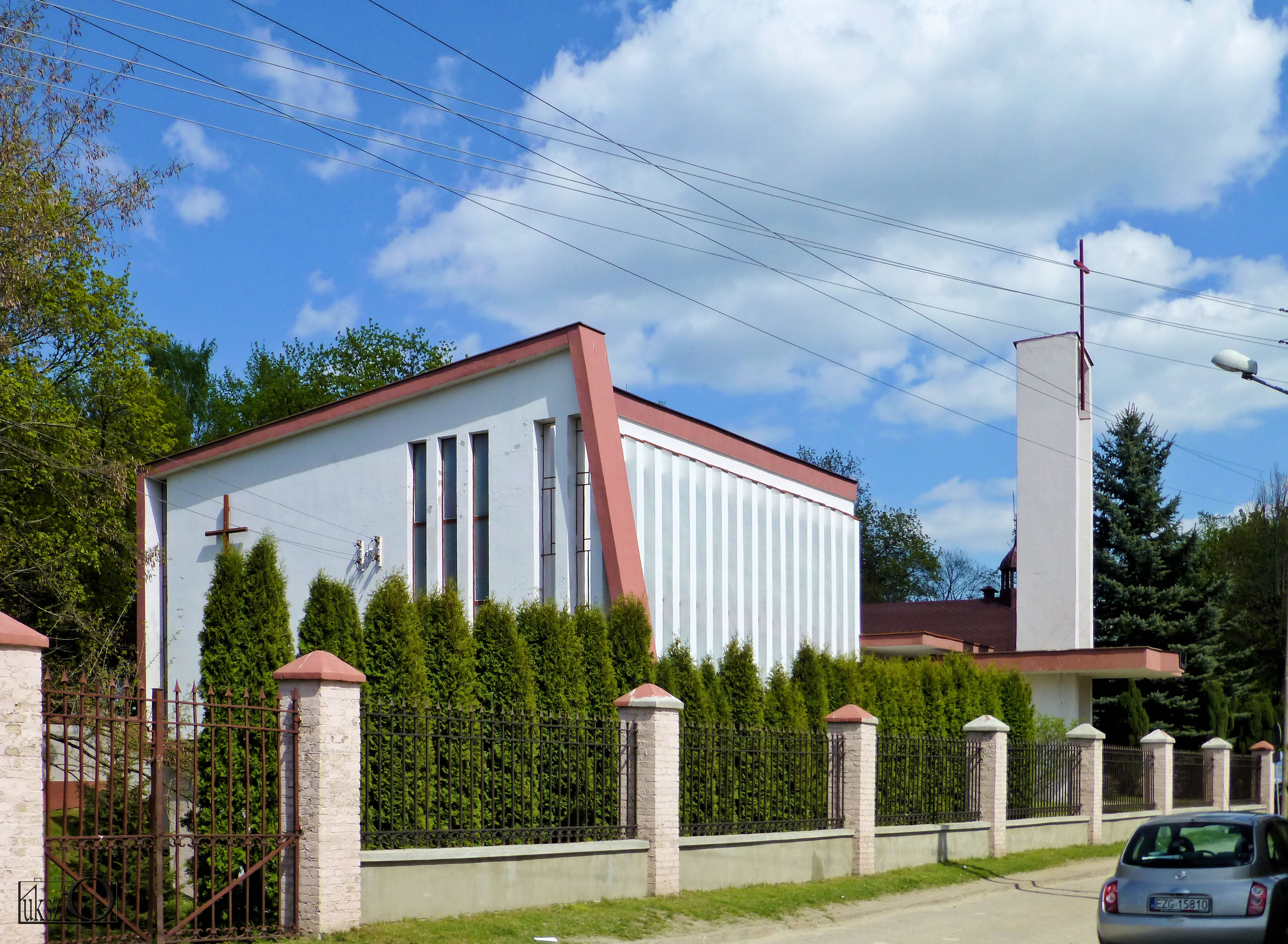
Church of Divine Providence, Zgierz
