= Tadeusz Jodłowski =

Polish artist

Tadeusz Jodłowski (1925 – 31 October 2015) was a Polish artist.

== Career ==
Born in Piekary Śląskie, he graduated from the Academy of Fine Arts in Kraków in 1951. Jodłowski has worked as an artist taking part in exhibitions both in Poland and abroad since 1953. Amongst his contributions were Cyrk posters belonging to the Polish School of Posters.

He is equally proficient using graphic forms, painterly means of expression or shapes derived from sculpture. He currently concentrates on print-making.

He died on 31 October 2015, at the age of 90.

== Major awards ==
- 1955 – 1st Prize, Posters -10th Anniversary of the Polish People's Republic, PL
- 1956 – 1st Prize -Polish Olympic (Melbourne, AU) Poster Competition, PL
- 1959 – Tadeusz Trepkowski Prize, Warsaw, PL – 2nd Prize at "15 lat PRL" exhibit in Warsaw, PL
- 1961 – Award – Int'l Exhibition of Publishing Art (IBA) in Leipzig, Germany
- 1965 – 3rd Prize -Polish Poster Biennale, Katowice, PL
- 1973 – 2nd Prize -Polish Days Poster, Göttingen, Sweden
- 1979 – 1st Prize -International Tourismus -Borse, Berlin, Germany
- 1985 – "Best Poster of the Year", Warsaw's Best Poster Competition, Warsaw, PL

== Major exhibitions include ==
- 1962 -Galerie in der Biberstrasse, Vienna, Austria
- 1965, 1967, 1971, 1975, 1985, 1987, 1989 –Polish Poster Biennales, Katowice, PL
- 1966, 1968, 1970, 1972, 1974, 1976, 1978, 1980, 1984, 1986, 1988, 1990 -International Poster Biennales, Warsaw, PL
- 1969, “Gallery of the Street”, Helsinki, Finland
- 1970, 1974, 1978, 1982, 1986, 1990 Poster Biennales, Brno, Czech Republic

== Other exhibitions ==
Washington D.C., USA (1964); Berlin, Germany (1973); Hanover, Germany (1978); Moscow, USSR (1990); Prague, Czech Republic (1990)

== Important positions include ==
- Art Director, (1955–1964), WAG (Graphic Arts Publishers), state poster publisher, Warsaw, PL
- General Secretary, International Poster Biennale, Warsaw, PL (1986 – present)
- Professor, Warsaw Academy of Fine Arts, Warsaw, PL
