= Hubert Hilscher =

Polish graphic artist (1924–1999)

- Born: 25 October 1924; Warsaw, Poland
- Died: 19 September 1999 (aged 74); Warsaw, Poland
- Movement: Graphic Design

Hubert Hilscher (25 October 1924 – 19 September 1999) was a Polish graphic artist.

== Biography ==
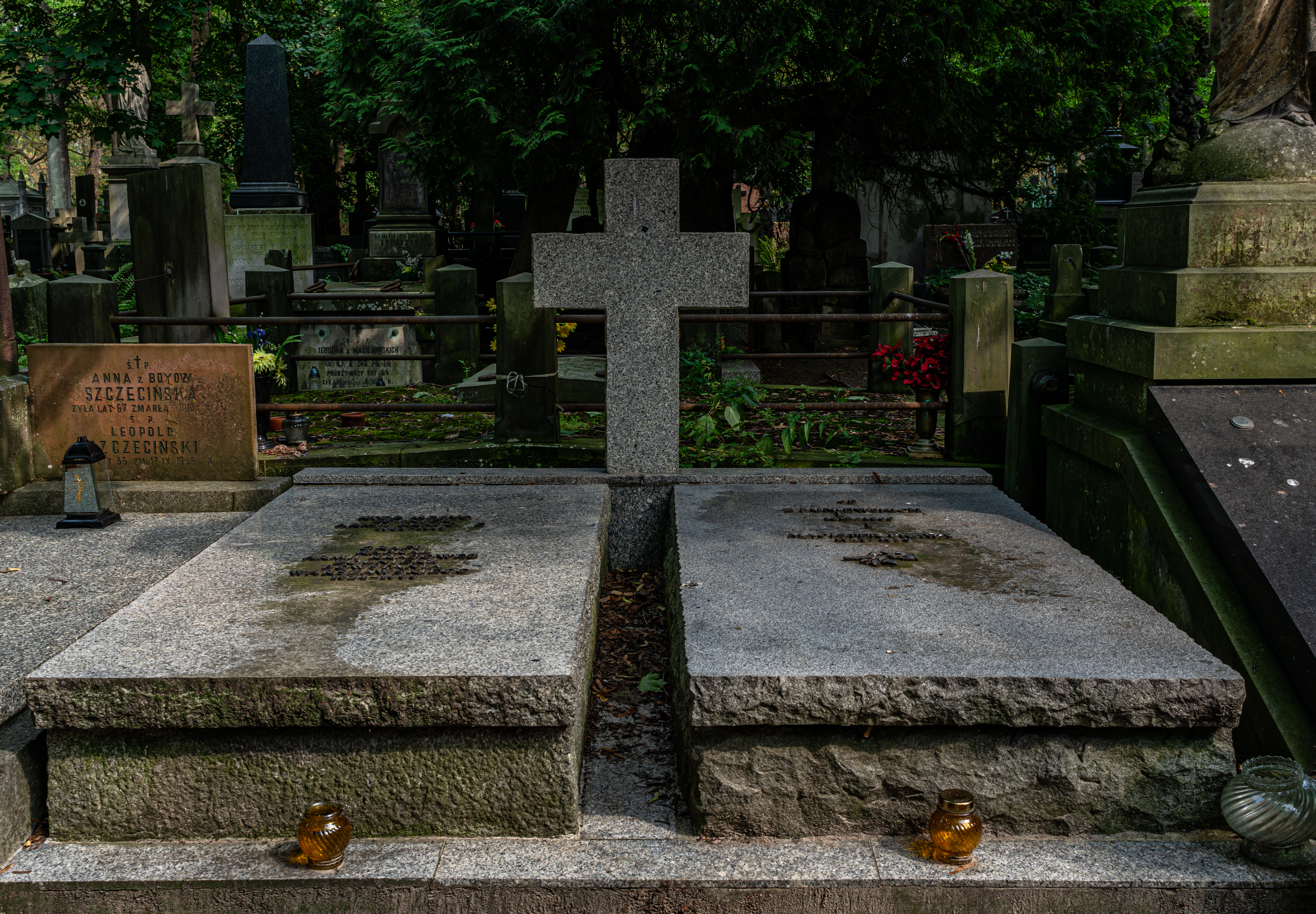
Hilscher's grave at the Powązki Cemetery

Hubert Hilscher was born in a German family in Poland. In 1944 when he was 20 years old, he fought in the Warsaw Uprising as a soldier of the Home Army, under the pseudonym ‘Zaremba’.

In 1949, his interest in printmaking led him to attend the State Academic School of Plastic Arts, where he studied under the tutelage of Tadeusz Kulisiewicz. The school merged with the Academy of Fine Arts in Warsaw in 1950. He graduated in 1955.

After graduating, Hilscher worked at WAG, a publishing house that provided patronage for poster designers. He served as its art director between 1961 and 1970.

In 1962, he served as art director for the bimonthly magazine Projekt until the magazine ceased production in 1983.

Hubert Hilscher died in 1999 at the age of 75. He is buried in Powązki Cemetery in Warsaw.

== Major awards ==
- 1967 – Silver Medal at the International Tourist Poster Exhibition, Milan (Italy)
- 1973 – Prize of the Year in the Best Warsaw Poster competition, Warsaw (Poland)
- 1981 – Second prize at the 4th Poster Biennial, Lahti (Finland)

== Gallery ==
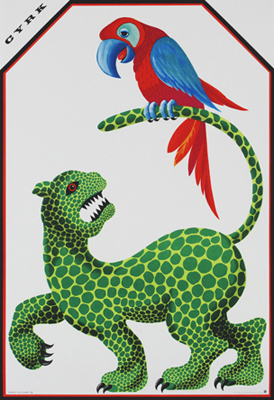
Circus poster by Hilscher

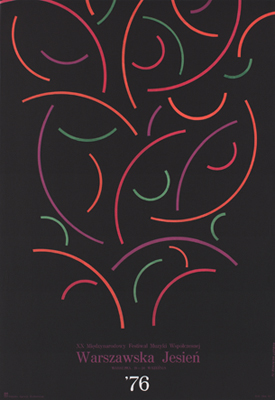
Hilscher's poster for Warsaw Autumn 1976

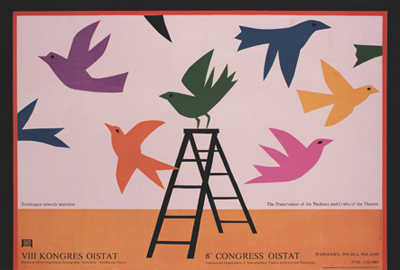
Hilscher's poster for the 8th OISTAT World Congress

== See also ==
- Cyrk (art)
- List of Polish graphic designers
