= Stanisław Thugutt =

Polish politician (1873–1941)

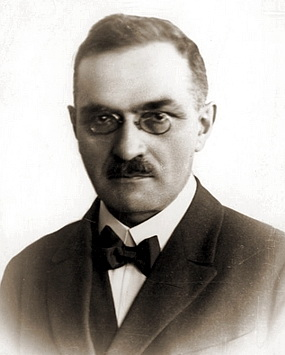

Minister of Internal Affairs
- In office 6 November 1918 – 16 January 1919
- Preceded by: Stanisław Ustyanowski
- Succeeded by: Stanisław Wojciechowski

Deputy Prime Minister of Poland
- In office 17 November 1924 – 21 May 1925

Personal details
- Born: 30 July 1873 Łęczyca, Congress Poland, Russian Empire (now Poland)
- Died: 15 June 1941 (aged 67) Stockholm, Sweden
- Party: Polish People's Party "Wyzwolenie"
- Children: Mieczysław Thugutt
- Occupation: Politician

Military service
- Allegiance: Austria-Hungary
- Unit: Polish Legions
- Battles/wars: World War I

Stanisław August Thugutt (30 July 1873 – 15 June 1941) was a Polish activist and politician during the interwar period of the Second Polish Republic.

During World War I, he was a soldier in the Polish Legions. He was the founder and leader of several peasant parties (particularly the Polish People's Party "Wyzwolenie"). Later he was the Minister of Internal Affairs (1918–1919), and vice-Prime Minister (1924–1925); he also had a special responsibility within the cabinet for "minority affairs", but was unable to improve the relations between the Ukrainians and the Belarusians, and resigned in May 1925. After the Invasion of Poland, Thugutt escaped to Sweden, where he died in exile. His son Mieczysław Thugutt was a mechanical engineer and became one of the operators of the Świt radio station that broadcast from England during the war to Poles living under the German occupation.

== Nomination of Narutowicz ==
Thugutt was largely responsible for the nomination of Gabriel Narutowicz, the first President of Poland, then a relative unknown. Other party members preferred Stanisław Wojciechowski, who became president after Narutowicz's assassination in 1922, but Thugutt selected Narutowicz as a "moderate Swiss radical" who was neither a socialist nor a populist and met the requirement set by Józef Piłsudski of not being an overly partisan candidate. Piłsudski initially encouraged Narutowicz to decline the nomination, but he eventually accepted, stating, "I do not want to put forth my candidacy by if Emancipation [Thugutt] decides to do it, there is nothing I can do."

Following the post-inauguration riots on 12 December 1922, Thugutt was part of the inquiry by the Sejm into the "December Events". He personally presented the results of the Administrative Commission to the Sejm, but his explanation for the causes of the violence, and Narutowicz's assassination, ignored the portrayal of Narutowicz as a "Jewish president" in much of the media and the violence directed against the Warsaw Jewish community. Per Thugutt's speech to the Sejm, the responsibility for the events was not a political group or party, but "a certain legal-political theory" that "every Pole-citizen (Polish: Polak-obywatel) has the sacred right to act over and above the Constitution". This contrasted with the repeated, specific claims in the 1922 right-wing press that ethnically non-Polish citizens of Poland had no right to participate in the political process, also known as the Doctrine of Polish Majority that had been formulated by the National Democrats in the lead-up to the election. The perception was not limited by political leaning - the absence of antisemitism as a cause of Narutowicz's murder was mirrored in one of the most liberal newspapers at the time, Kurier Poranny. Thugutt avoided the controversy by defining the causes of the violence in legal terms and gained support of the Sejm for his report on the issue. The second culprit Thugutt identified was a "certain portion of the Warsaw press". While he was also critical of the role of the police, he argued against calls for any additional investigations into the riots, or their root causes.

== Works ==
- Krótki Przewodnik po Warszawie i okolicach (1914)
- Listy do młodego przyjaciela (1939, 2002)
- Wykłady o spółdzielczości (1945)
- Autobiografia (1984)
- Wyznania demokraty: publicystyka z lat 1917-1939 (ed. Jan Sałkowski) (1986)
- Stanisław Thugutt o demokracji i ustroju Polski (ed. Władysław Wic) (1998)
