= Mieszko =

- Pronunciation: Polish: [ˈmjɛʂkɔ]
- Gender: male

Origin
- Origin: Slavic
- Meaning: miecz ("sword")

Other names
- Related names: Mieczysław

Mieszko is a Slavic given name of uncertain origin.

== Onomastics ==
There are three major theories concerning the origin and meaning of the name of Duke Mieszko I of Poland. The most popular theory, proposed by Jan Długosz, explains that Mieszko is a diminutive of Mieczysław, a combination of two elements or lexemes: Miecz meaning sword and Sław meaning famous. Today, this theory is rejected by the majority of Polish historians, who consider the name Mieczysław to have been invented by Długosz to explain the origin of the name Mieszko. It is known today that ancient Slavs never formed their names using either animal names or weapon names. Ancient Slavic names were abstract in nature. The same explanation rules out another theory about the origin of the name Mieszko, which links the name with the Polish word miś or miśko meaning bear, as no animal names were used to form honorable Polish names among Polish nobility.

The second most popular theory about the origin and sense of Mieszko's name can be traced to the very old legend, firstly described by Gallus Anonymus, according to which Mesco (the Latinized form used by the earliest sources) was blind during his first seven years of life. The chronicler related this story (a typical medieval allegory) as follows:

At that time (after Mieszko recovered his eyesight) Prince Siemomysł urgently asked the elderly people of his country whether his son's blindness conveyed some miraculous meaning. They explained that this blindness meant that Poland was blind back then, but from now was going to be illuminated by Mieszko and elevated over the neighboring nations.

This interpretation was a clear reference to the later baptism of the duke:

Poland was indeed blind before, knowing nothing about the true God or the principles of the Catholic faith, but thanks to the enlightenment of Mieszko the country also had become enlightened, because when he adopted the faith, the Polish nation was saved from death and destruction.

In addition, it is known that the Slavic word "mzec" can be interpreted as "having his eyes closed" or "be blind". Yet again, today it is almost certain that this legend was used as a metaphor, in allusion to the old Slavic pagan ceremony known as the "postrzyżyny": During that ceremony hair cutting was performed to every boy at the age of seven. In that symbolic rite a child became a man. That explains that Mieszko wasn't blind in fact. He was blind only metaphorically. Besides his son's name was also Mieszko and it is hard to believe that he was also blind. In addition, early medieval Slavs used only abstract names among nobility.

== List of people named Mieszko ==
- Mieszko I of Poland (c. 935–992), duke of the Polans from about 960 until his death
- Mieszko II Lambert (990–1034), king of Poland (1025–1031) and duke from 1032 until his death
- Mieszko III of Poland (ca. 1126/27–1202), also known as Mieszko III the Old
- Mieszko I Tanglefoot (c. 1130–1211), duke of Silesia, Racibórz, and Opole, and briefly duke of Kraków and high duke of Poland
- Mieszko I, Duke of Cieszyn (1252/1256–1315), founder of Cieszyn Piast dynasty and the first duke of Cieszyn
- Mieszko II the Fat (c. 1220–1246), duke of Opole-Racibórz and Kalisz-Wieluń
- Mieszko Bolesławowic (c. 1069–1089), prince of Kraków from 1086 until his death
- Mieszko Mieszkowic (979/984 – aft. 992/995), Polish prince, member of the House of Piast
- Mieszko Talarczyk (1974–2004), former guitarist and vocalist of Grindcore band Nasum
- Mieszko S.A. is a Polish confectionery firm known for "Michaszki" hazelnut chocolates
