= St. Matthew's Church, Łódź =

St. Matthew’s Church, Łódź
- Kościół św. Mateusza
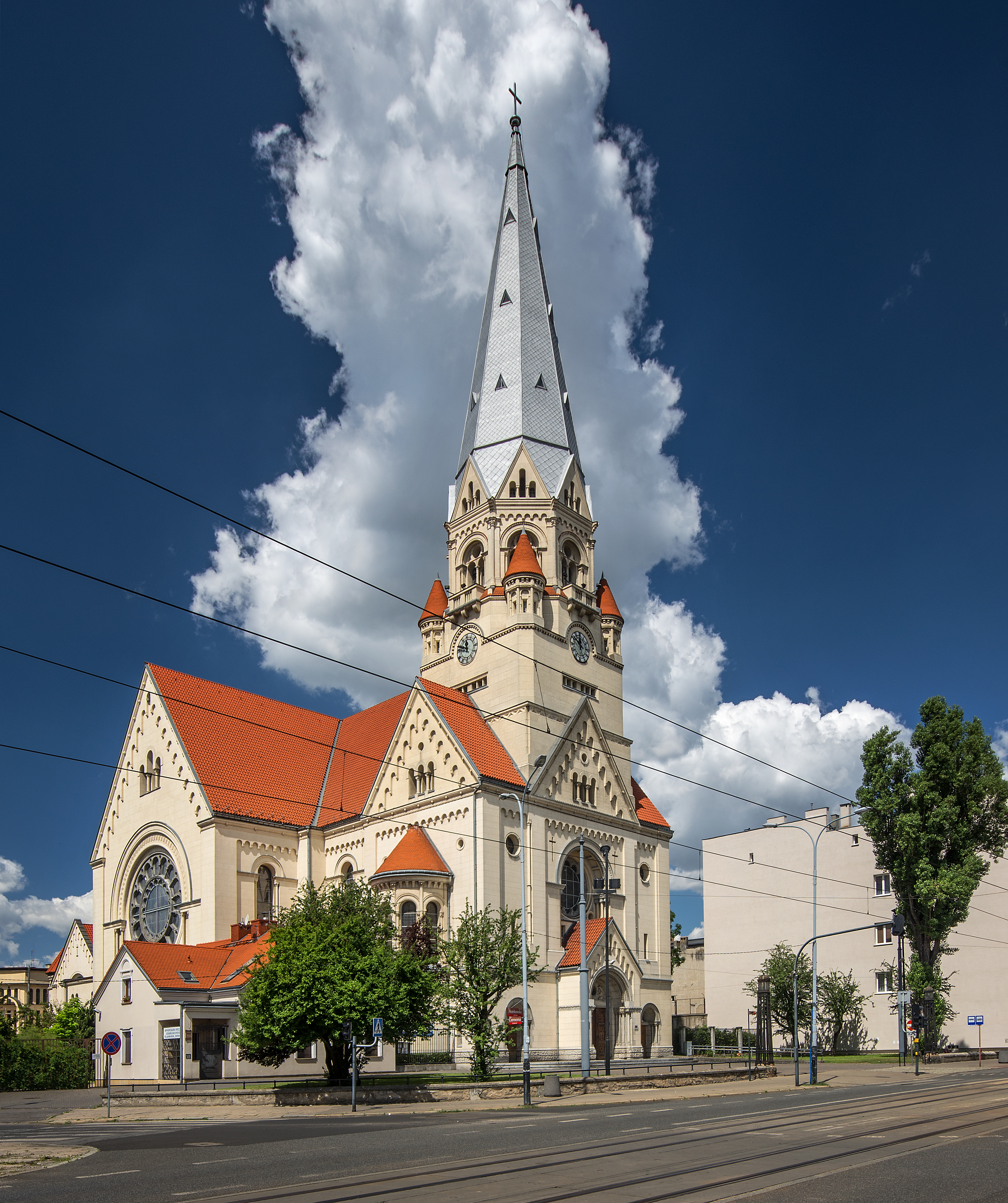
- St. Matthew’s Church, Łódź
- 51°44′47.55″N 19°27′38.76″E
- Location: Łódź
- Country: Poland
- Denomination: Lutheran

History
- Consecrated: 1 November 1928

Architecture
- Architect(s): Johannes Wende, Franz Schwechten
- Style: Neoromanesque
- Years built: 1909-1928
- Groundbreaking: 8 October 1909

Administration
- Diocese: Lutheran Diocese of Warsaw

St. Matthew's Church in Łódź is a Lutheran church and historic landmark located in Piotrkowska Street, at a short distance from the city's Catholic cathedral. The third Lutheran church in Łódź at the time of its construction, it is now the only church in the city that serves the Evangelical Church of the Augsburg Confession in Poland, the country's largest Protestant denomination.

== History ==
St. Matthew's was the first Lutheran church in Łódź to be built in the southern part of the city and the third Lutheran place of worship after Holy Trinity Church and St. John's. Its construction was in part inspired by the erection of the nearby Catholic church of St. Stanislaus Kostka that became a cathedral of the newly established Roman Catholic Diocese of Łódź in 1920. The rivalry between the Protestant and Catholic communities in Łódź is considered to have played a major role in expanding the original designs and leading to the construction of a church that was not to be dwarfed by its Catholic counterpart located only about 300 metres north. Due to the impact of the 1905 Łódź insurrection, construction works began only in 1909 although plans had been made earlier. The church was designed by a local architect, Johannes Wende, who later designed the nearly identical church of St. Adalbert in Białystok. Wende's blueprints were also amended by the Berlin architect Franz Schwechten, which gave the church its final shape.

St. Matthew's became a listed building in 1971 and figures as a nonmoveable heritage object in the Polish heritage register (no. A/115 from 20 January 1971).

In 2013 a time capsule from 1923 was discovered in a tin tube hidden under the church floor. In 2014 another time capsule from 1922 was found hidden in the ball under the cross at the top of the spire. Both caches contained newspapers and magazines, as well as banknotes and letters from the period.

The church has been witness to a number of ecumenical services involving various Christian denominations. In 2016 the first ever Anglican service at St. Matthew's was presided over by Martin Warner, Bishop of Chichester, as part of the Paradise in the City ecumenical festival held in Łódź to mark the visit of Pope Francis at the World Youth Day in Kraków. In 2017 a joint Lutheran-Catholic service was held in the church to mark the 500th anniversary of the Protestant Reformation.

St. Matthew's is often used as a concert venue. Regular organ concerts have been organized in the church since 1996.

== Architecture ==
St. Matthew's church was built in the Neo-Romanesque style, a contrast to the nearby Neo-Gothic Roman Catholic cathedral. The church plan is based on the Greek cross, topped with a reinforced concrete dome with a diameter of 26 metres. The upper section of the tower is octagonal, and the spire reaches the height of 80 metres. There are large rose windows with stained glass delivered by the Breslau glassmaker Adolph Seiler. Characteristic elements of the interior include the marble altar, a massive chandelier, and the organ, built in 1928 by Rieger Orgelbau.

== See also ==
- Evangelical Church of the Augsburg Confession in Poland
- Lutheran Diocese of Warsaw
- Media related to St. Matthew's Church in Łódź at Wikimedia Commons
