= Mieczysław Cieślar =

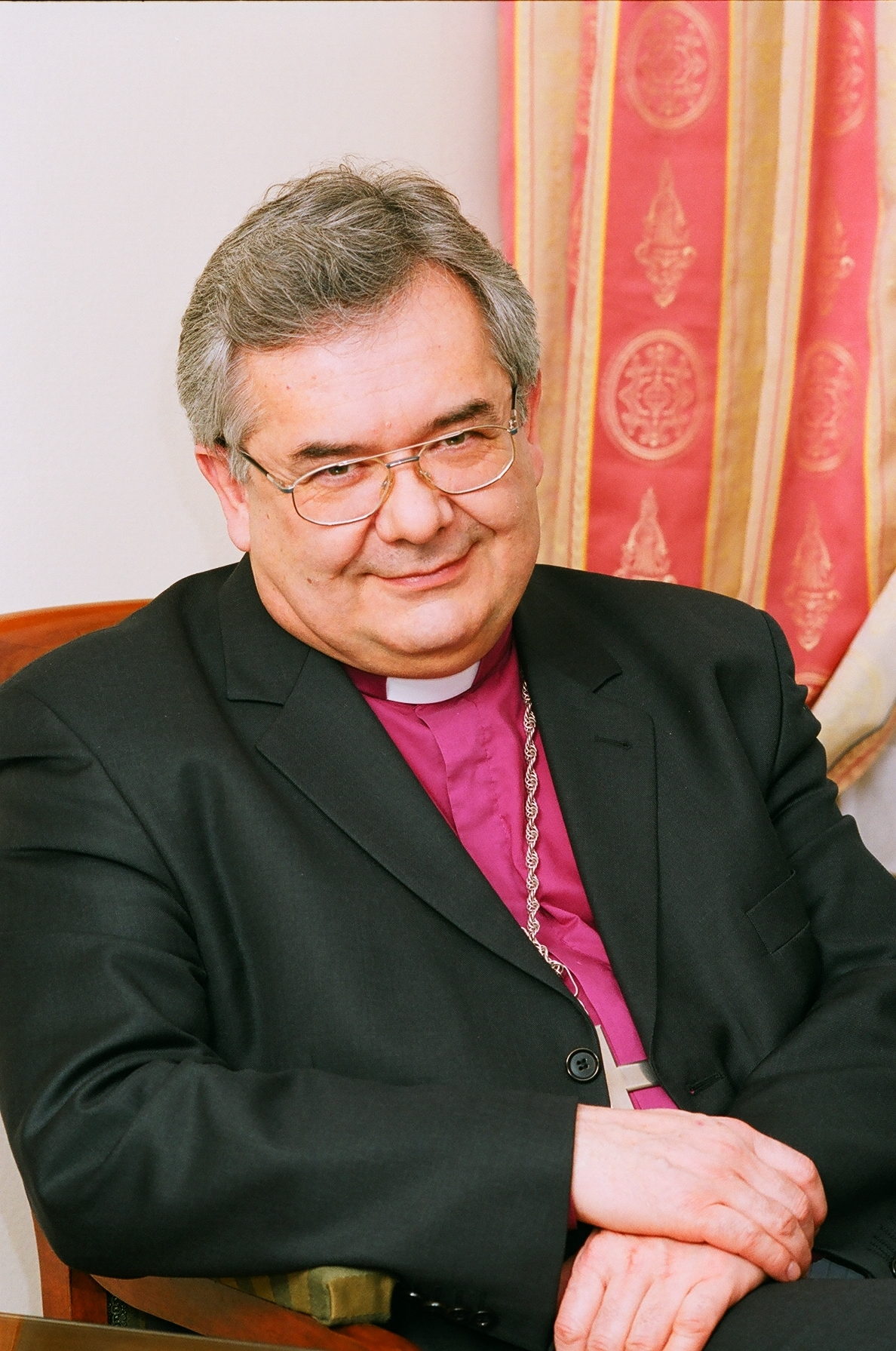
M. Cieślar

Mieczysław Cieślar (March 28, 1950 – April 18, 2010) was a Lutheran theologian and bishop of the Evangelical Augsburg Church in Poland. He died on April 18, 2010, in a car accident, returning home from attending state funeral services for Lech Kaczyński, Poland's president, who died in the 2010 Smolensk plane crash.

From 1996 Mieczysław Cieślar was the bishop of the Lutheran Diocese of Warsaw and concurrently the provost of the Lutheran communities of St. Matthew's Church in Łódź and in Aleksandrów Łódzki.
