= Joanna Tarnawska =

Polish politician

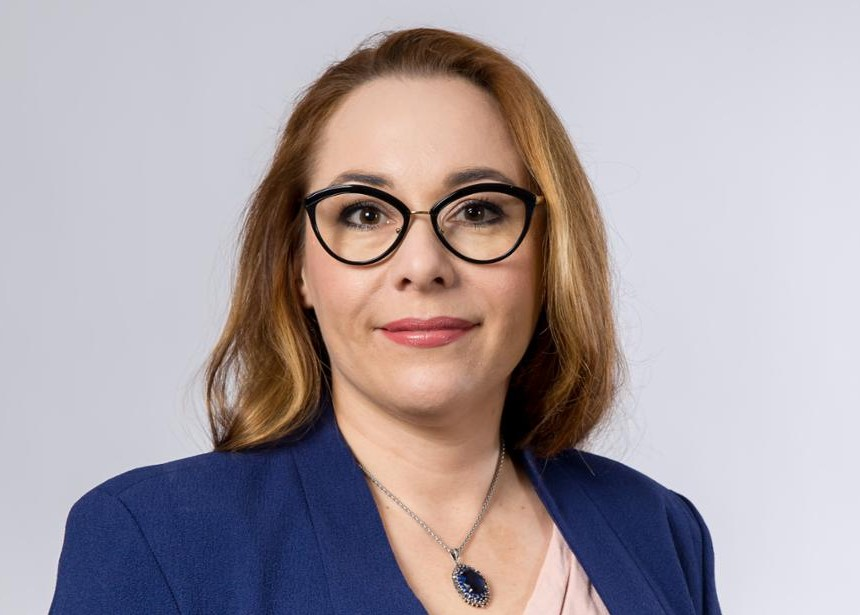

Poland Ambassador to Nigeria
- In office September 2018 – July 2024
- Preceded by: Andrzej Dycha
- Succeeded by: Michał Cygan

Personal details
- Born: 1976 (age 49–50) Warsaw
- Education: University of Warsaw

Joanna Magdalena Tarnawska (born 1976 in Warsaw) is a Polish diplomat who served as ambassador to Nigeria from 2018 to 2024.

Joanna Tarnawska has spent her youth in Zambia where she attended Catholic elementary and high school. She graduated from African studies, University of Warsaw. She worked for the Ministry of Environment. In September 2018 she was appointed as Polish ambassador to Nigeria, accredited to Benin, Cameroon, Equatorial Guinea, Ghana, Liberia, Sierra Leone, and Togo as well. She ended her mission in July 2024.
