= Mieczysław Detyniecki =

Polish artist

Mieczysław "Mietek" Detyniecki (born 28 November 1938 in Warsaw) is a Polish artist. In 1972, he received first place in the National Drawing Award of Venezuela. In 1973, he was honored in Poland for the Best Engraving of the Year. In 1975, he received first prize in the National Prints and Drawings Show of Mérida. Detyniecki, who has exhibited across Europe and America, is the author of the book The Visible.
