= Mieczysław Thugutt =

Polish politician

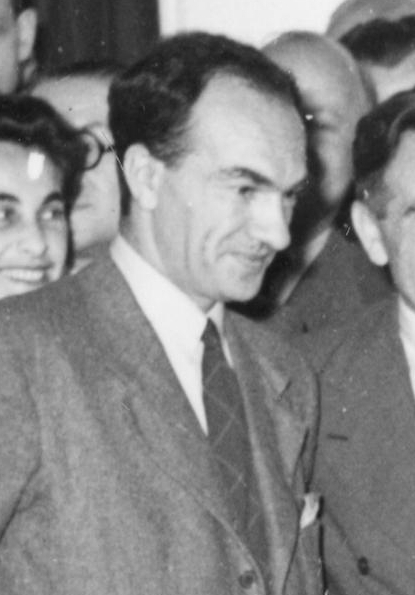
- Thugutt at a function of the Polish government-in-exile, 27 July 1943. Photograph from the National Digital Archives

Ministry of Internal Affairs
- President: Władysław Raczkiewicz

Ministry of Post and Telegraphs
- In office 28 June 1945 – 1 February 1946 Serving with Tadeusz Kapelinski
- President: Władysław Raczkiewicz
- Prime Minister: Tomasz Arciszewski
- Preceded by: Emil Kaliński
- Succeeded by: Józef Putek

Personal details
- Born: 20 May 1902 Ćmielów, Congress Poland
- Died: 8 March 1979 (aged 76) Brockley, London, United Kingdom
- Resting place: Brockley Cemetery
- Party: Polish People's Party
- Other political affiliations: People's Party; Polish People's Party
- Parents: Stanisław Thugutt (father); Maryla née Kozanecka (mother)
- Education: Warsaw University of Technology

Military service
- Allegiance: Polish Socialist Party
- Branch/service: Unia Stowarzyszeń Polskiej Młodzieży Niepodległościowej
- Battles/wars: Third Silesian Uprising
- Other name: Adam

Mieczysław Thugutt (Polish pronunciation: [mʲɛtʂɨˈswaf]; 20 May 1902 – 8 March 1979) was Polish politician and refugee who lived in the United Kingdom.

== Early life ==
Thugutt was born in 1902 in Ćmielów, Congress Poland to Maryla née Kozanecka and Stanisław Thugutt. As a member of the Polish Socialist Party, he took part in the Third Silesian Uprising, having just turned 20 years old. Following the conflict he went on to study mechanical engineering at the Warsaw University of Technology.

== Career ==
On graduation, Thuggut became an assistant to one of its professors Michał Broszko, before taking a job as an engineer at the Marconi Company in 1929. The following year he started a position at the firm of Lilpop, Rau i Loewenstein, where he continued working until 1939.

=== World War II ===
Following the Nazi invasion of Poland in 1939, Thugutt first moved to Vilnius then, soon after the Soviet occupation of the Baltic states, emigrated to neutral Sweden. Residing in Stockholm he took on the pseudonym Adam under which he worked in the Ministry of Internal Affairs for the government-in-exile. In 1942 Thugutt once again emigrated, this time leaving for the United Kingdom. Once there Thugutt became closely acquainted with Stanisław Mikołajczyk, and was tasked with supervising the secret radio station Świt.

=== Post–war ===
With the liberation of Poland by the Soviet Union, talks were undertaken to establish the Provisional Government of National Unity. Thugutt was subsequently appointed to the position of Minister of Post and Telegraphs on the suggestion of Mikołajczyk. However, Thugutt refused to leave the UK to take up his post and was only in his position nominally. Thereafter he became something of an opponent of Mikołajczyk, although remaining loyal to the Polish People's Party.

In the aftermath of World War II, an investigation into War crimes uncovered the accidental role Thugutt had played in the execution of his former school friend Stanisław Dubois. Having sent Dubois a food parcel while he was interned at Auschwitz, Thugutt unwittingly exposed his friend to the attention of the Gestapo resulting in the former's execution.

=== Guesthouse in Brockley ===
After the war Thugutt opened and ran a guesthouse in Brockley. In 1947 Zofia and Stefan Korboński stayed at hiss guesthouse on their way to exile in the United States.

== Personal life ==
Whilst living in Warsaw during the Second Polish Republic Thugutt is known to have wedded although the marriage was brief. In exile, Thugutt settled in the south-east London district of Brockley, where he lived with his mother (until her death in 1949) his second wife, and two children from his first marriage.

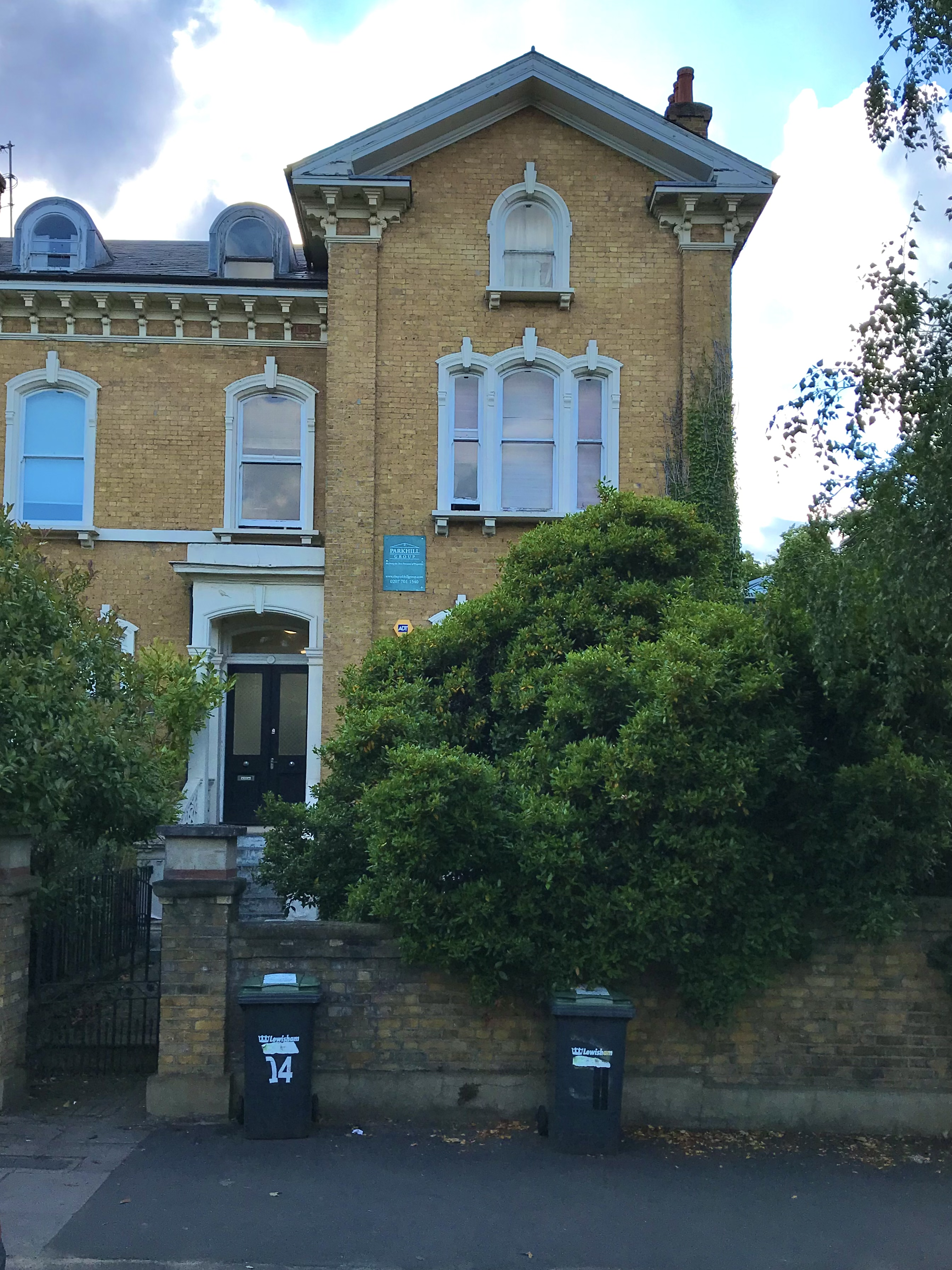
Former residence and guesthouse of Thugutt in Brockley, London
