= Wiesław Wałkuski =

Polish graphic designer

- Born: 1956 (age 69–70); Białystok, Poland
- Occupation: Graphic designer
- Known for: Poster design

Wiesław Wałkuski is a graphic designer born in Poland. Today he is much exhibited and works as a freelancer painter and poster artist.

== Biography ==
Wiesław Wałkuski was born in 1956 in Białystok, Poland. He started his graphic design education at the Warsaw Academy of Art which he attended for 5 years, during the period 1976–1981. He studied under several design lecturers including Maciej Urbaniec who lectured in poster design and Teresa Pągowska who lectured in painting. At the end of his studies he was employed by Polfilm and Film Polski to produce artwork and cover designs. During this period he also worked with visual studio publishers and numerous theatre groups producing artwork for productions. In 1987 he commenced his career as a freelance graphic designer.

Today, Wiesław Wałkuski has more than 200 posters to his name and he continues his work as a poster designer, an illustrator and a painter. He lives and works in Warsaw. His works are presented at major Polish and international poster exhibitions including some at The Weidman Gallery in West Hollywood.

== Major awards ==
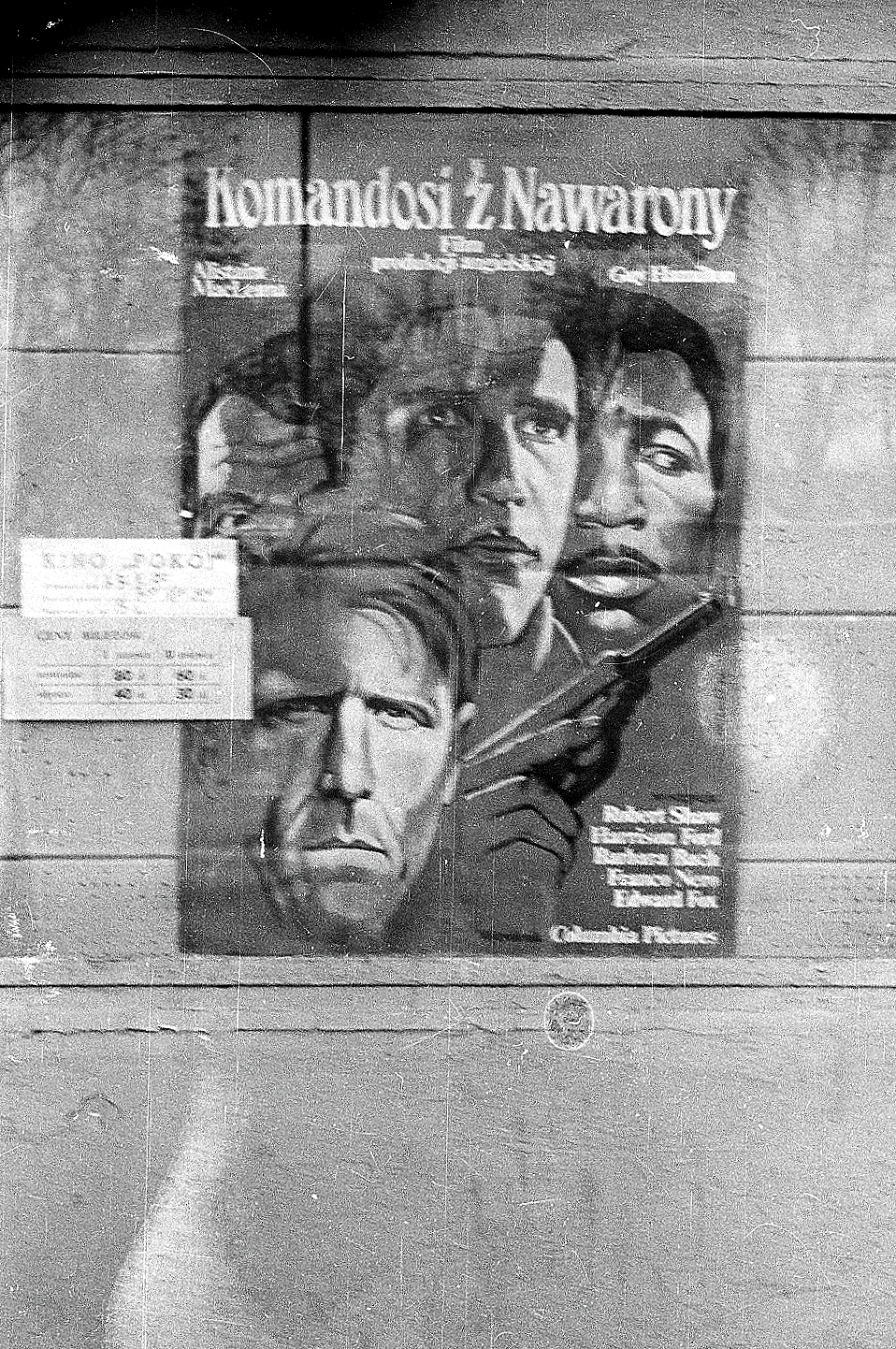
"Force 10 from Navarone" poster by Wiesław Wałkuski

- 1981 - 3rd prize, National Ideas of Solidarity competition, Warsaw (Poland)
- 1983 - 2nd prize, International Movie Festival, Chicago (USA)
- 1986 - 1st prize, International Movie Festival, Chicago (USA)
- 1988 - 1st prize, Hollywood Reporter Key Art Awards, Los Angeles (USA)
- 1988 - 2nd prize, International Movie Festival, Chicago (USA)
- 1990 - 2nd prize, Hollywood Reporter Key Art Awards, Los Angeles (USA)
- 1990 - 2nd prize, International Poster Biennial, Mexico City (Mexico)
- 1992 - 2nd prize, International Art Directors Club Exhibition, New York (USA)
- 1992 - Laterna Magica prize
- 1993 - 3rd prize, International Theater Poster Biennial, Rzeszow (Poland)
- 1995 - Polish Artists Association prize, Biennial of Polish Poster, Katowice (Poland)
- 1996 - 3rd prize, International Poster Festival, Chaumont (France)
- 1997 - 2nd prize, Grand Prix, Biennial of Polish Poster, Katowice (Poland)
- 1997 - 3rd prize, III-rd International Theater Poster Competition, Osnabrück (Germany)
- 1998 - 1st prize, National 20th Anniversary of Pope John Paul II Pontificate Competition (by invitation), Warsaw (Poland)

== See also ==
- List of graphic designers
- List of Polish painters
- List of Polish graphic designers
- Graphic design
