= Mieczysław Jaroński =

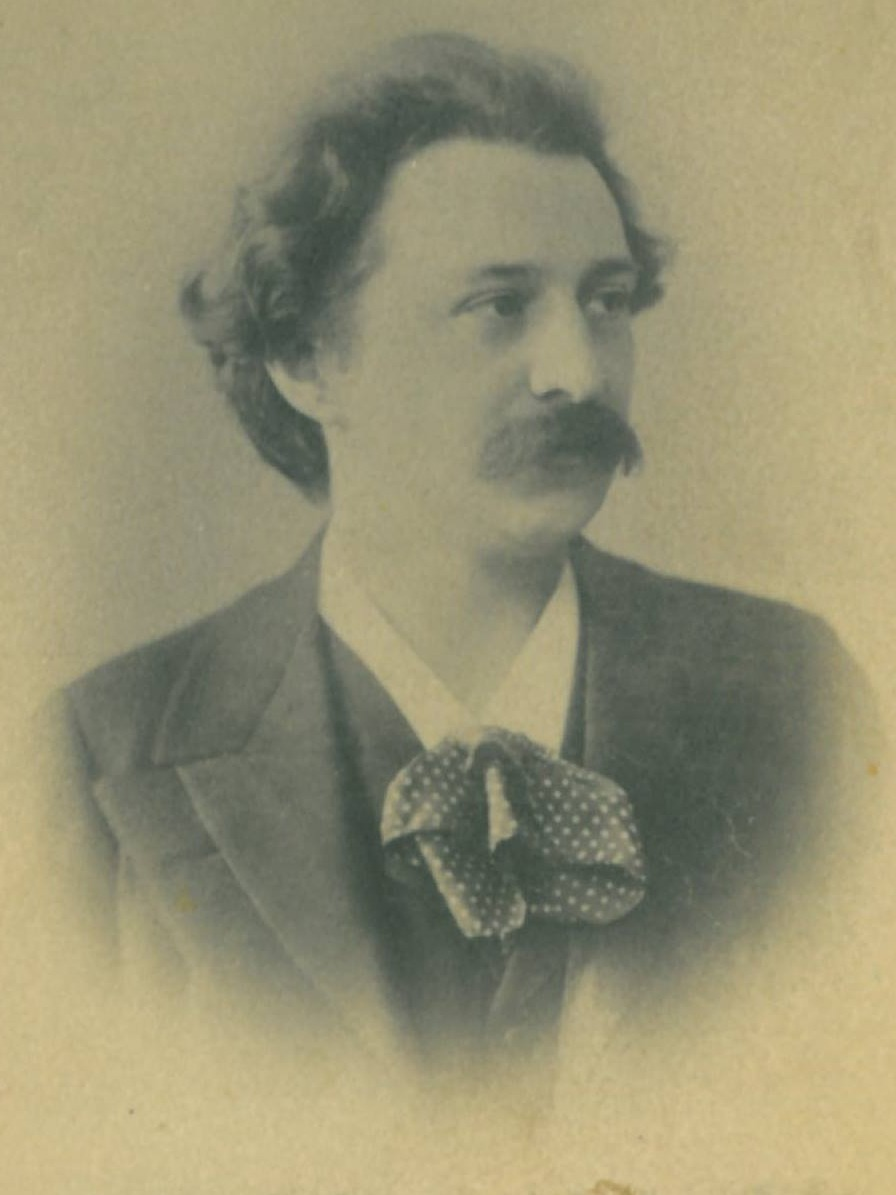
Mieczysław Jaroński

Mieczysław Jaroński (31 December 1862 - 10 January 1922, different birth date 1 January 1861) was a Polish violin virtuoso and teacher.

== Life and work ==
Mieczysław Jaroński was born in Kielce as the son of Polish pianist, composer and teacher Feliks Jaroński (1823–1895) and Stefania, born Głowacka (1835–1907). His brothers were the singer and cellist Stanisław (1863–1916) and the politician and lawyer Wiktor (1870–1931). He was the grandson of Józef (1775–1834), judge at the civil court in Kielce and appeal court in Warsaw and great nephew of philosopher Felix (1777–1827).

He initially received music lessons from his father Felix and violin lessons from a teacher in Krakow. From 1884 to 1887, he studied at the Leipzig Conservatory together with his younger brother, the cellist Stanisław. There he received lessons from Adolph Brodsky and Hans Sitt (violin playing), Carl Reinecke (ensemble playing) and Oscar Paul (lectures), among others. In 1887, he took up a professorship for violin at the Odessa Conservatory. He performed in Paris, London and Berlin, among other places.

At the end of the 19th century, he lived in Constantinople as a guest of his aunt Ludwika Groppler, née Głowacka, and her husband Henryk Groppler, where he regularly gave concerts, including many times for Sultan Abdul Hamid II. He owned a violin by the Italian violin maker Giovanni Paolo Maggini from the early 17th century with a diamond-studded bow. After his return to Kielce, he took over the position of artistic director of the Musical-Dramatic Society there (1907).

On 5 February 1912, he married Helena Kaczor from Lisów, a servant girl of his brother who was 27 years younger than him. He settled down with her in Dobromyśl near Kielce. They had seven children together.

He died on 10 October 1922 from pneumonia, which he contracted while rescuing a drowning man. He was buried in the cemetery in Białogon, Kielce, with his wife, who died in 1957.
