= Mieczysław Morański =

Polish actor (1960–2020)

- Born: 21 January 1960; Warsaw, Poland
- Died: 27 December 2020 (aged 60)
- Education: Aleksander Zelwerowicz National Academy of Dramatic Art in Warsaw
- Occupations: actor (voice, theatre, film, television)
- Employers: Teatr Polski in Warsaw (1983–1987); Teatr Dramatyczny (1987–1994); Teatr Rampa (1994–2020)

Mieczysław Morański (21 January 1960 – 27 December 2020) was a Polish actor.

== Biography ==
He was mostly known for his dubbing of popular children film and cartoon characters, including Barney, Asterix, and Slinky Dog, as well as Eric Cartman. He had several roles in Polish soap operas, amongst others in Na dobre i na złe, Na wspólnej and Plebania.

He was also an accomplished theatre actor throughout his life, right until his death from COVID-19 during the COVID-19 pandemic in Poland in 2020, twenty five days short from his 61st birthday.
