= Mieczysław S. Ostojski =

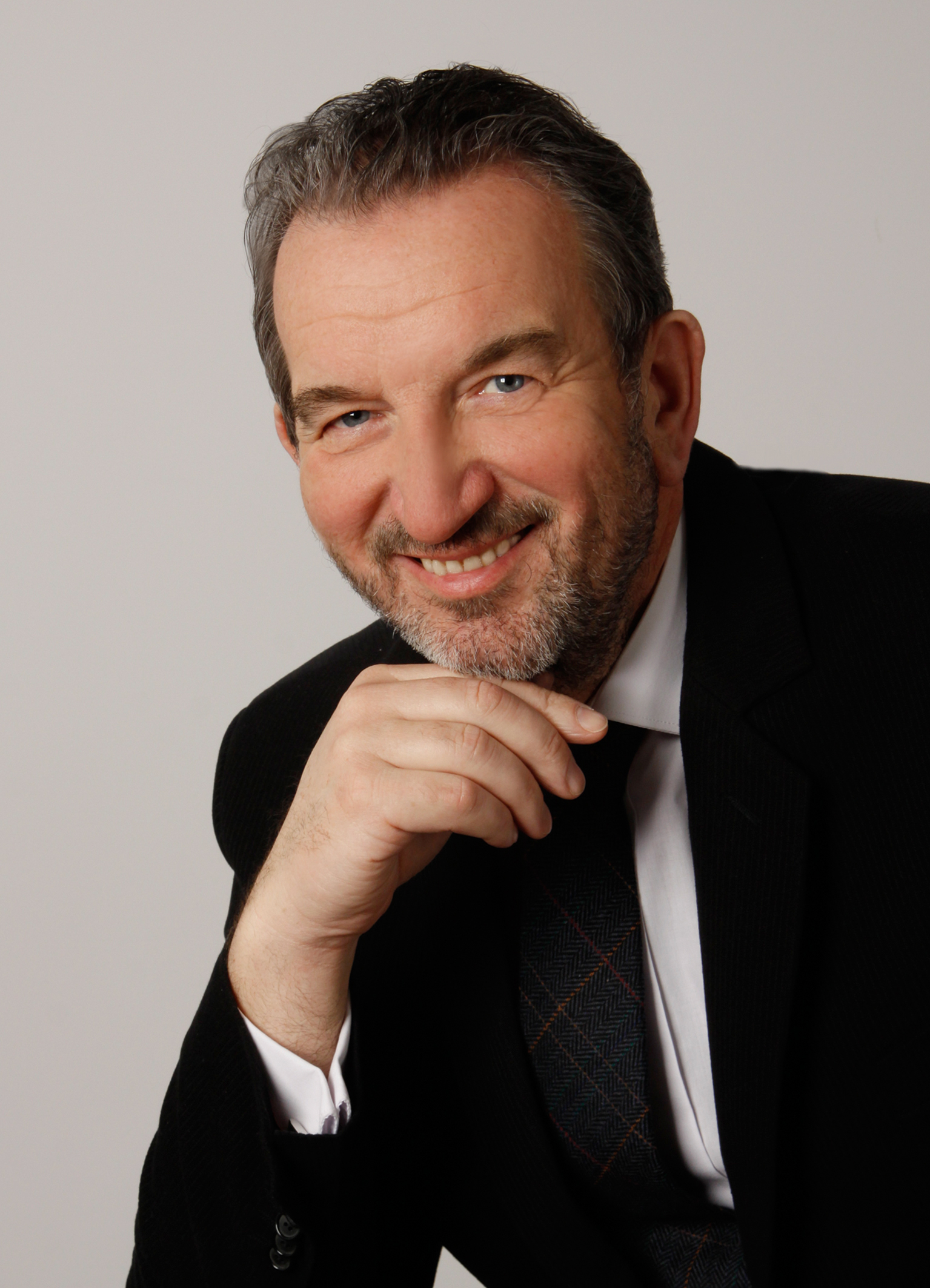
Mieczysław Ostojski

Mieczysław Stefan Ostojski (born 1 January 1954) was the second vice-president of the World Meteorological Organization and former director general of the Polish Institute of Meteorology and Water Management.

== Early life ==
Mieczysław S. Ostojski was born on 1 January 1954 at Sławno. He graduated from the Gdansk University of Technology, where in 1988 he received the degree of Doctor of Environmental Engineering. In 2012 he obtained a postdoctoral degree of environmental engineering at the Faculty of Environmental Engineering at Wroclaw University of Technology.

== Career ==
In the years 1991-1995, Ostojski was the organizer and first director of the Regional Water Management in Gdansk. He worked in the Ministry of the Environment as director of the Foreign Relations Department at the ministry from 1996 to 1999. In 1999-2003 he headed the Secretariat of the Convention for the Protection of the Marine Environment of the Baltic Sea in Helsinki (HELCOM) as executive secretary. After returning from Helsinki in August 2003, Ostojski was appointed director of the Department of Water Resources, Ministry of Environment for the period from September 2003 to May 2006. From 1 June 2006, Ostojski directed the Institute of Meteorology and Water Management State Research Institute.

Ostojski has also held the following positions:

- Chairman of the Polish Delegation of the International Commission for the Protection of the Oder (December 2003 - August 2006)
- President of the European Network of Organisations Zlewniowych (2004-2005),
- President of the International Network of Organizations Zlewniowych (1995)
- Vice-Chairman of HELCOM PITF Program (1997-1999),
- The Executive Secretary of the Helsinki Commission - HELCOM (1999-2003),
- Chairman of the Polish Delegation of the HELCOM (1996-1999, from 2003 to 30 June 2006)
- Chairman of the Helsinki Commission, HELCOM from 1 July 2006 to 30 June 2008.
- Member of the Executive Council of the World Meteorological Organization (WMO) (2007 - date) and Vice-President of the European Association of Regional WMO - RA VI WMO (2010 - date)
- Vice President of the World Meteorological Organization (25 May 2011 - to date)
- M. Ostojski is also a member of the Committee. The Audit of the World Meteorological Organization (WMO) and the representative of this organization in the Committee of the UN Committee.

== Prosecution charges ==
In 2016, M. Ostojski was arrested on charges of corruption, abuse of powers in order to obtain financial gain, fraud and falsification of the document. In 2017, the District Prosecutor's Office in Warsaw announced that a total of 94 charges had been brought against him, including corruption, abuse of powers to accept property benefits, fraud, misappropriation of property and falsification of documents.

== Patents ==
Ostojski M. & D. Karkosiński Device for sampling liquids especially from an open sewer. PRL Patent No. 148,659 (253,896 copyright certificate dated 9 May 1990).

== Selected publications ==
- World Water Day 2006. Water for Life 2005-2015. Ed .: Committee for Water Sciences, Warsaw of June 2006.
- The Water Framework Directive of the European Union - the state of implementation in Poland. Ed .: Institute of Meteorology and Water Management, Warsaw, 2008.
- Baltic Sea Action Plan of the Helsinki Commission. Ed .: Institute of Meteorology and Water Management, Warsaw 2008.
- EU water policy for the protection of the waters of the Baltic Sea. Ed .: Institute of Meteorology and Water Management, Warsaw, 2010.
- Chemical weapons dumped in the Baltic Sea by the war. Ed. Institute of Meteorology and Water Management, Warsaw, 2010.
- The computer system covers the country against extraordinary threats. Ed. The NOT Silesia, Katowice, 2010.
- "Directory gauging station". IMGW PIB. Warsaw, 2011. Collective work, in the implementation of
- "Product presence of priority substances in the waters of the rivers in the area municipalities." Publisher IMGW PIB. Warsaw 2010. (IMGW PIB, Centre for Monitoring Water Quality). Group work.
- "Monograph flood of 2010." - Changes in water quality - the Vistula basin. IMGW PIB. Warsaw, 2010. Working under the direction of M. Ostojski.
- "Monograph flood of 2010." - Changes in water quality - Odra River Basin. IMGW PIB. Warsaw, 2010. Working under the direction of M. Ostojski.
- "The state of cleanliness of rivers on the basis of the results of research carried out in the framework of the national environmental monitoring in 2007-2009." GIOŚ Library Environment Monitoring. Warsaw, 2010. Collective work.
- "Directory of uniform and integrated part of the waters." GIOŚ Library Environment Monitoring. Warsaw, 2009. Collective work.
- "The state of cleanliness of rivers on the basis of the results of research performed within the State Environmental Monitoring in 2007-2008." GIOŚ Library Environment Monitoring. Warsaw, 2009. Collective work.
- "Reducing phosphorus and nitrogen discharged from the Polish to the waters of the Baltic Sea 2000 - 2006 - 2021". 26 Heads of Delegation meeting in the framework of the HELCOM Convention on 04-05.06.2008 r. Working under the direction of M. Ostojski.
- "Detailed monitoring tests to determine the amount of phosphorus and nitrogen in the waters of rivers, affecting the area of the Polish Baltic Sea." GIOŚ. Warsaw, 2008. Working under the direction of M. Ostojski.
- "Assessment of pollutant loads discharged into the Baltic Sea rivers from areas 9 countries between 1995 and 2000". GIOŚ, IMGW. Warsaw, 2006. Collective work.
- "Balance kind of work in water management - assessment of the situation." Ostojski M., Krzysztof Zareba, Wojciech Szczepanski. Senate Conference, Warsaw, 01.02.2011 r.
