= Mieczysław Górowski =

Mieczysław Górowski (February 5, 1941 – August 31, 2011) was a Polish graphic artist.

== Early life and education ==
He was born in Miłkowa 1941 Nowy Sącz. He studied at the Jan Matejko Academy of Fine Arts in Kraków from 1959 to 1966 where he later served as a professor on the Faculty of Industrial Design.

== Career ==
He started designing posters in 1966 and has created over 400 posters. In addition, he worked in interior design and painting but, as the artist said about himself: "For many years I have been creating posters – this is the main direction of my artistic and design activity". His art can be found in collections in Europe as well as North America. He died in Kraków.

== Major awards ==
- 1983 – First Prize – International Poster Invitational, Fort Collins, Colorado
- 1986, 1987 – International Poster Salon, Paris, France
- 1987 – International Art Directors Club Exhibition, New York
- 1989 – Honourable Prize – International Poster Biennal – Warsaw 1989
- 1992 – First Prize – International Biennale of the Poster, Mexico
- 2000 – Master's Eye Award – at International Poster Triennal – Trnava, Slovakia
