= Mieczysław Baryłko =

Polish painter

- Born: 1923; Siedlce
- Died: 2002 (aged 78–79); Sopot

Mieczysław Baryłko (1923–2002) was a Polish painter. He had graduated from the Mikołaj Rej Gymnasium in Warsaw. During the World War II, Mieczyslaw attended the Lycée for Machine Construction at the Wawelberg School. On 20 January 1943, he was arrested by Gestapo and detained in prison "Pawiak". He was subsequently imprisoned in the concentration camps of Auschwitz, Gross-Rosen and Flossenburg until the end of the War in 1945. He returned to Elbląg in Poland where he started to work as a technician in the zinc and tin department of the Factory of Metal Goods. Next, he moved to Gdańsk, where he could finally realise his old dream and complete the studies in art at The State College for Visual Arts [PWSSP] in Gdańsk with the seat in Sopot. He graduated in 1953, but from 1950 to 1972 he worked in his college. Initially, he was an assistant, then an adjunct and a senior lecturer. He participated in the painting works during the reconstruction of Old Town in Gdańsk. In the years 1956-1958 and 1968–1969, he was the Chairman of the Association of Polish Painters and Designers Branch in Gdańsk. He works are in the collections of the National Museums in Warsaw, Gdańsk and Szczecin, the Historical Museum of the City of Gdańsk, the Dresden Gallery and private collections.

== Bibliography ==
- Janusz Janowski, Mieczysław Baryłko, in: Mieczysław Baryłko – kat. wyst.z cyklu „Ocalić od zapomnienia”, ZPAP Gdańsk 2007.
