= Mieczysław Tarnawski =

Polish film and stage actor

- Born: 12 October 1924; Tarnopol, Poland
- Died: 12 September 1997 (aged 72); Bystra, Poland
- Occupation: Actor
- Years active: 1959-1997

Mieczysław Tarnawski (12 October 1924 – 12 September 1997) was a Polish film and stage actor.

== Work ==
He passed an actor exam in 1959 and played in the following venues:

- Teatr im. Stefana Jaracza in Olsztyn and Elbląg (1960),
- Teatr Wybrzeże in Gdańsk (1960–1964),
- Bałtycki Teatr Dramatyczny im. Juliusza Słowackiego w Koszalin and Słupsk (1965),
- Teatr Dramatyczny im. Aleksandra Węgierki w Białystok (1966–1967),
- Teatru Ziemi Pomorskiej in Grudziądz (1967),
- Teatr Polski in Bielsko-Biała (1968–1983),
- Teatr Polski in Bydgoszcz (1983–1989).

== Selected filmography ==
- Ostatni kurs (1963)
- Barbara i Jan, Episode No. 7 Willa na przedmieściu (1964)
- Sposób bycia (1965)
