= Silesian Museum (Katowice) =

Coordinates: 50°15′37.84″N 19°01′20.02″E

Silesian Museum in Katowice
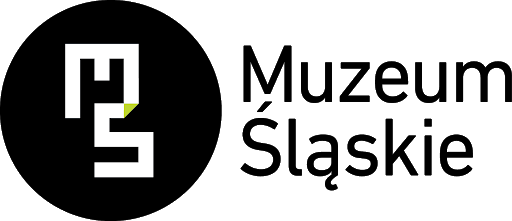

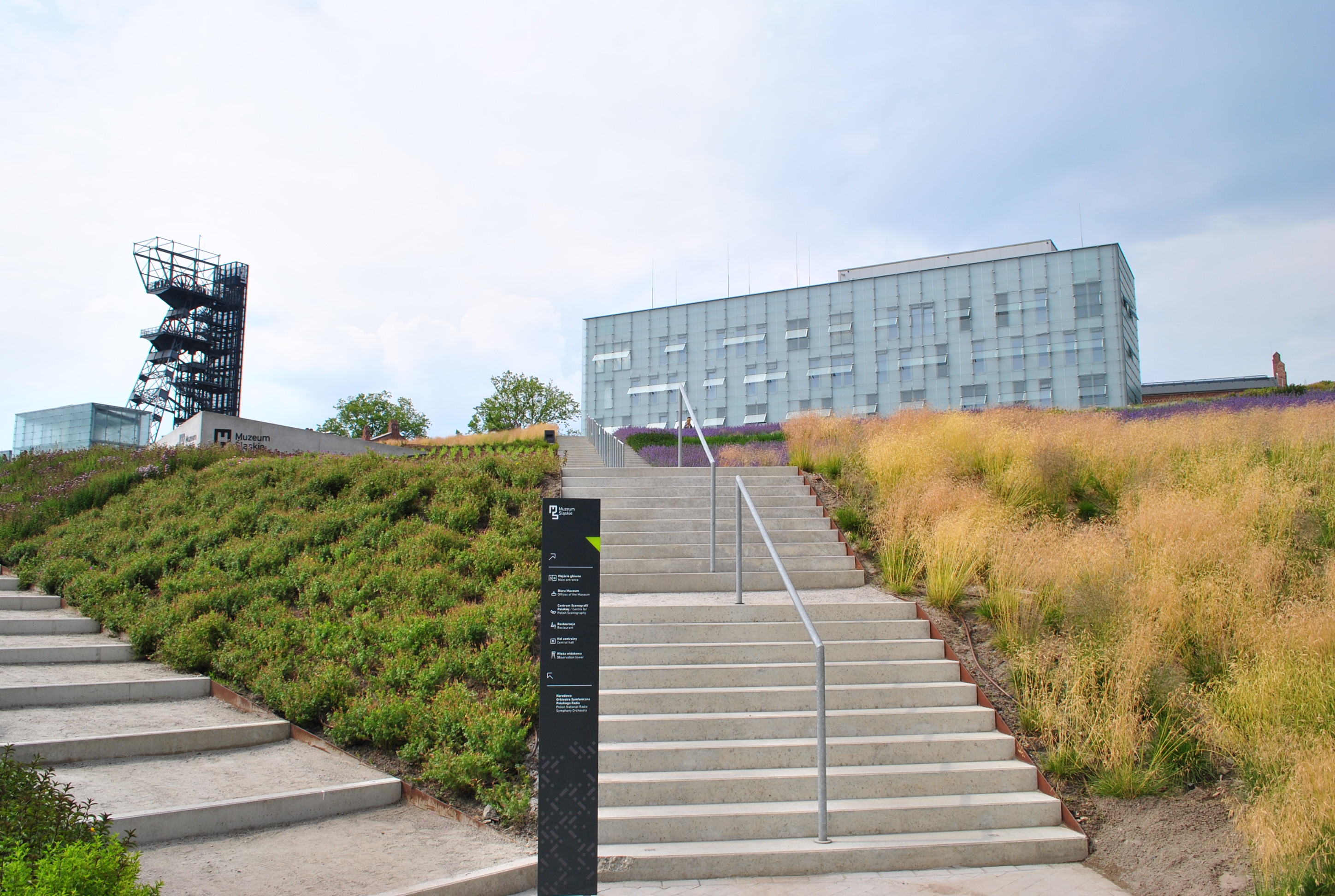
- Established: 1929, 1984 reinstated
- Location: 1 Tadeusza Dobrowolskiego Street; Katowice, Poland
- Type: Voivodeship museum
- Director: Łukasz Galusek
- Website: www.muzeumslaskie.pl

Silesian Museum in Katowice (Polish: Muzeum Śląskie w Katowicach; Silesian: Muzeum Sylezyjske w Katowicy) is a museum in the city of Katowice, Poland.

== History ==
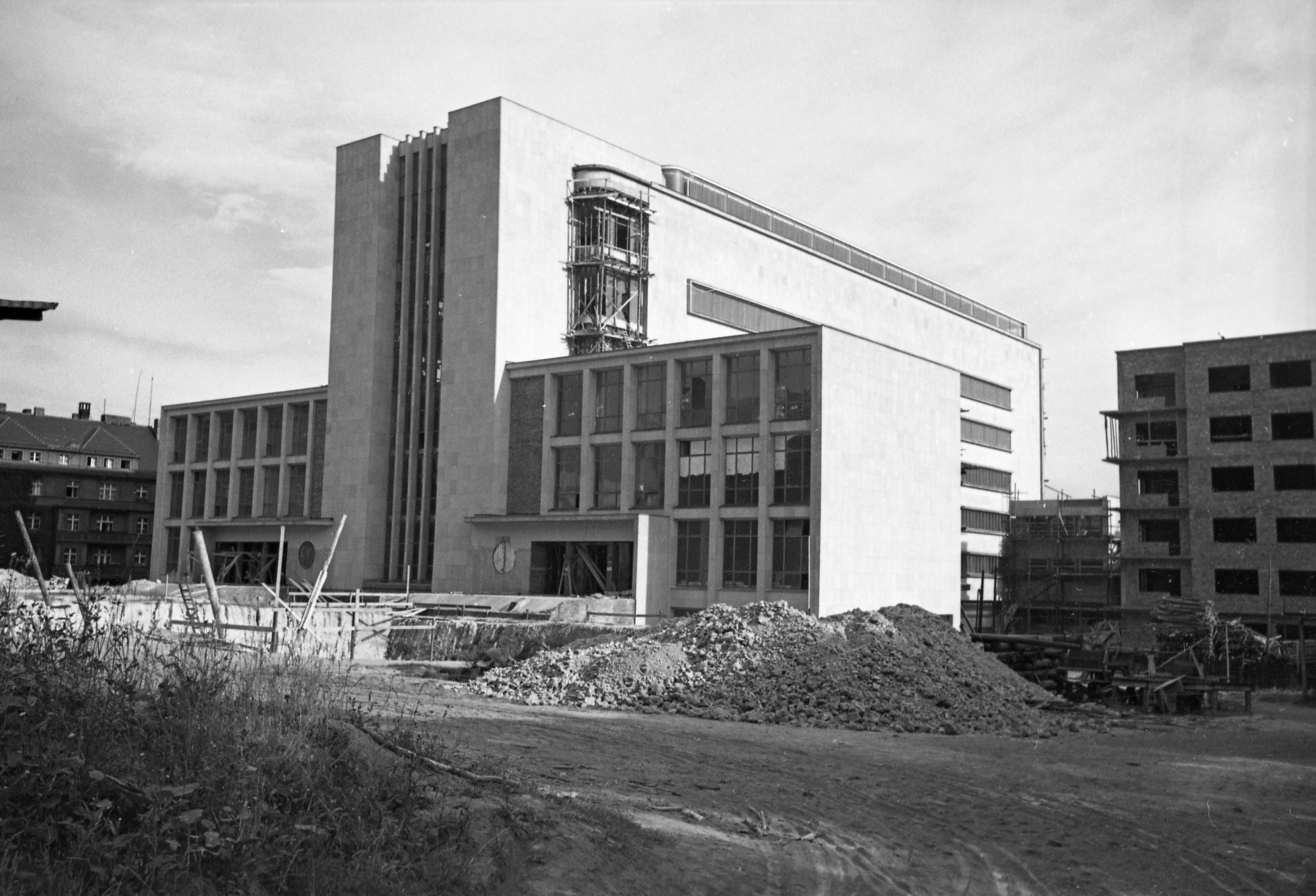
Non-existent, (destroyed by Wehrmacht, as a sign of new rule) building of the Silesian Museum, near the current Henryka Dąbrowskiego Street 23 in Katowice

The museum was founded in 1929 by the Silesian Sejm, while the region was recovering from the Silesian Uprisings. In the 20th-century interbellum, the Silesian Museum in Katowice was one of the biggest museums in Poland. After their invasion of Poland, the Nazi Germans however brought the collection to Bytom and tore the building down in 1940. In 1984 the museum was reinstated in the former Grand Hotel in Katowice. In 2015 a new main location was opened on the site of the former Katowice coal mine. The new museum reuses some of the historical buildings from the mining complex, and the primary exhibition space is underground.

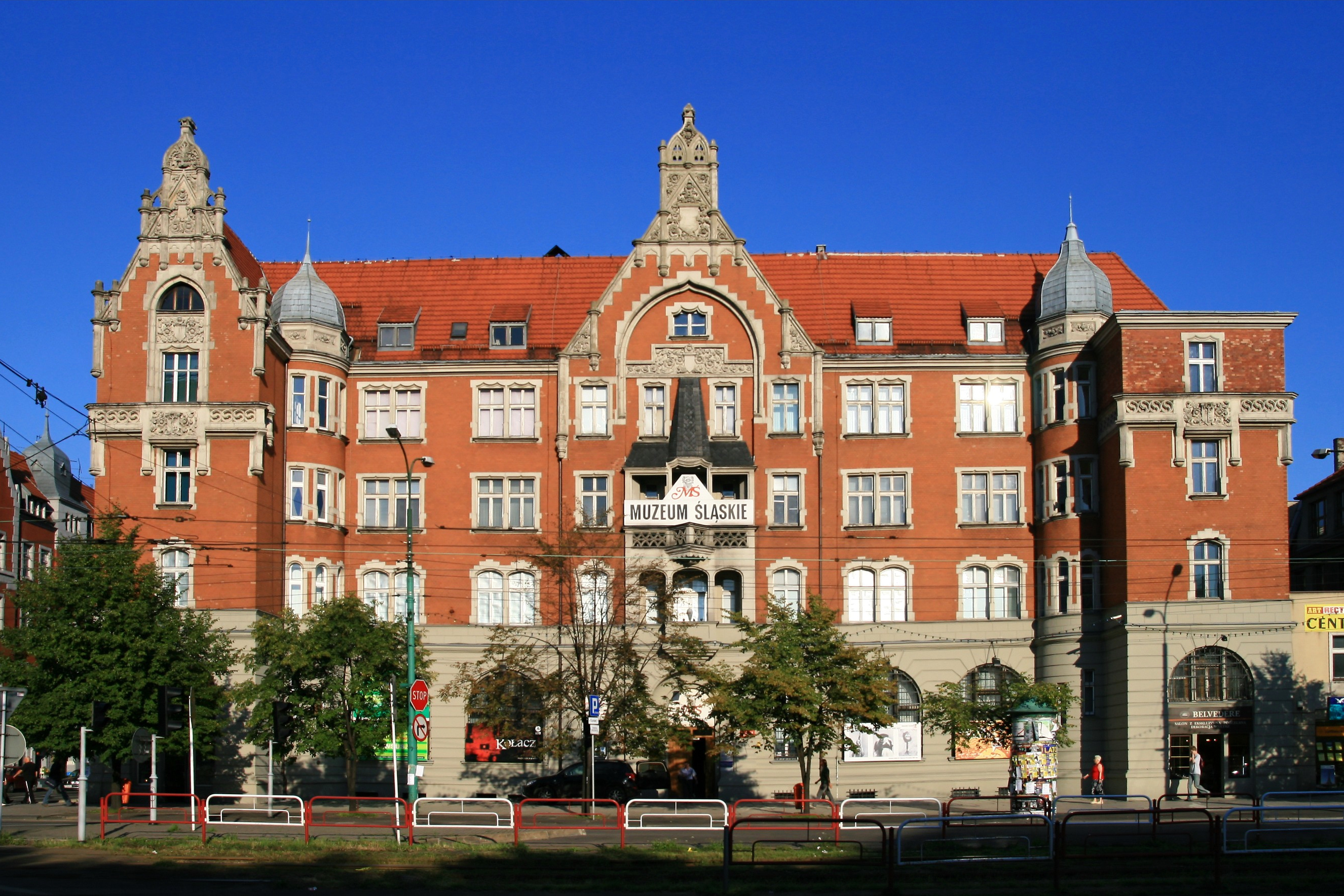
Former Grand Hotel, 1984-2015 seat of the museum before 2018

== Collection ==
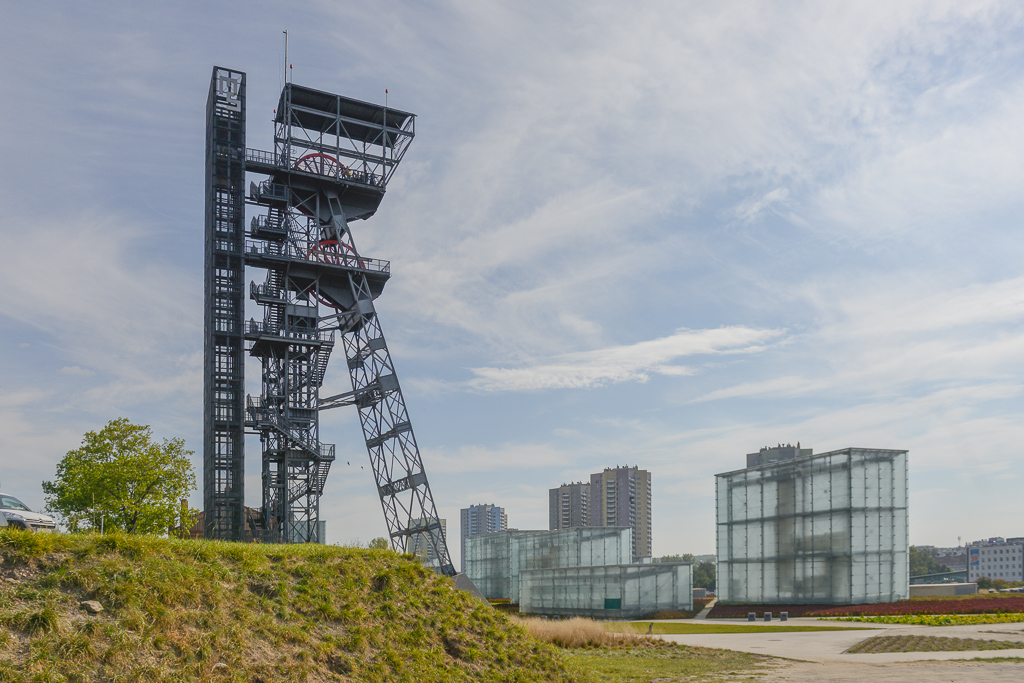
Warszawa mine shaft tower, now part of the Silesian Museum in Katowice

Permanent exhibitions and attractions include attractions, exhibitions and galleries dedicated to:

- Upper Silesia over the course of history, presented in Polish, English, and German, and notably addressing sensitive issues such as the area's German cultural heritage and relationship with Germany – topics taboo under the Communist regime.
- Polish art 1800–1945
- Non-Professional Art
- Polish Art after 1945
- On the trail of Tomek Wilmowski
- Sacred Art
- Silesian industry
- Laboratory of theatrical space

=== Artists on display ===
Among the works of Polish art are remarkable examples portraits by Stanisław Wyspiański, paintings by Olga Boznańska, Henryk Rodakowski, Jan Matejko, Józef Chełmoński, Aleksander Gierymski, Jacek Malczewski, Leon Wyczółkowski, Józef Pankiewicz, Władysław Podkowiński, and Jan Stanisławski. Other artists on display from the original collection, returned from Bytom, are:

- Jan Cybis
- Henryk Derczynski
- Tadeusz Makowski
- Józef Mehoffer
- Piotr Michałowski
- Tymon Niesiołowski
- Stanisław Witkiewicz
- Witold Wojtkiewicz

More contemporary artists on display are: Edward Dwurnik, Adam Marczyński, Andrzej Wróblewski, Tadeusz Kantor, Jerzy Nowosielski, Władysław Hasior, Zdzisław Beksiński, Lech Majewski, Zbigniew Libera, Natalia LL.

== Gallery ==
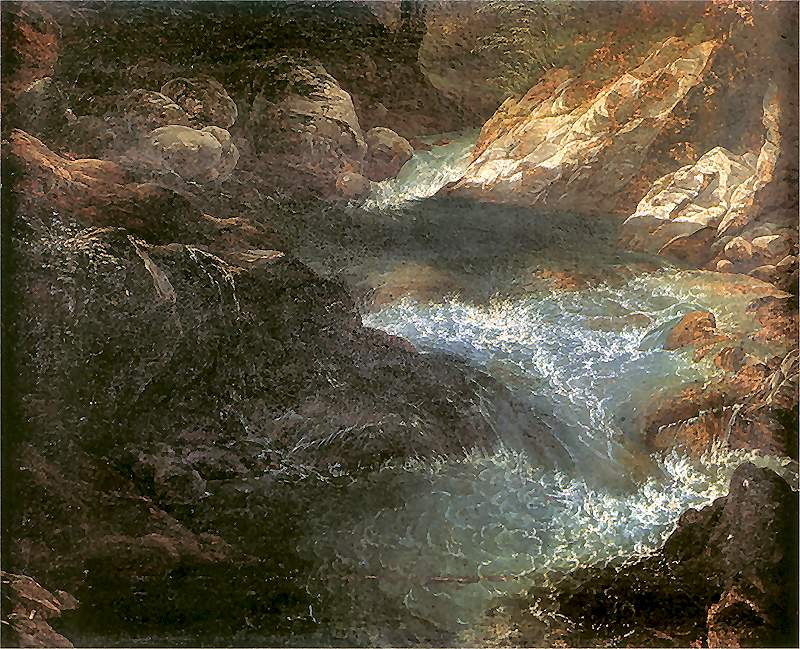
Mountain Stream, Jan Nepomucen Głowacki

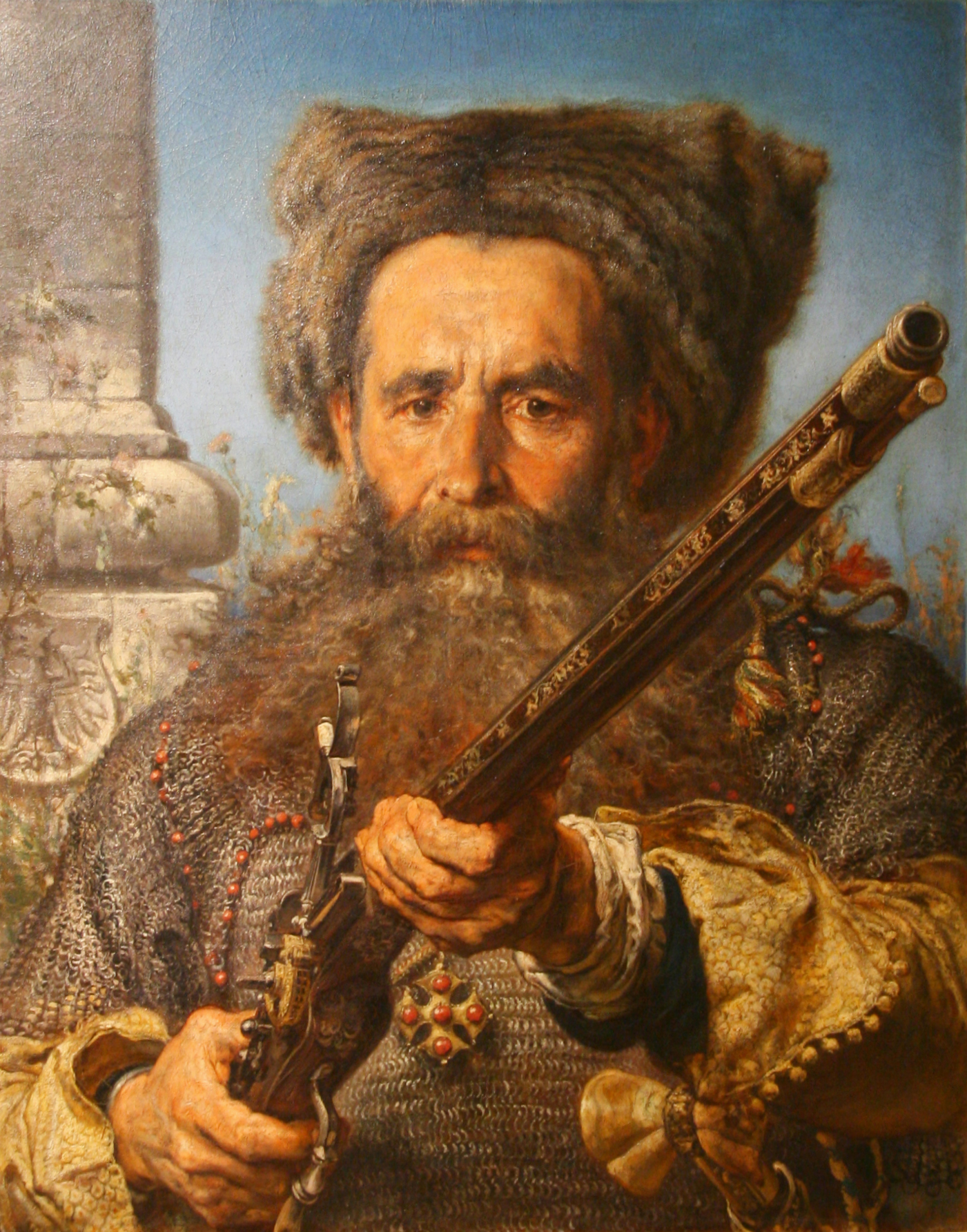
Portrait of Hetman Ostafij Daszkiewicz, Jan Matejko

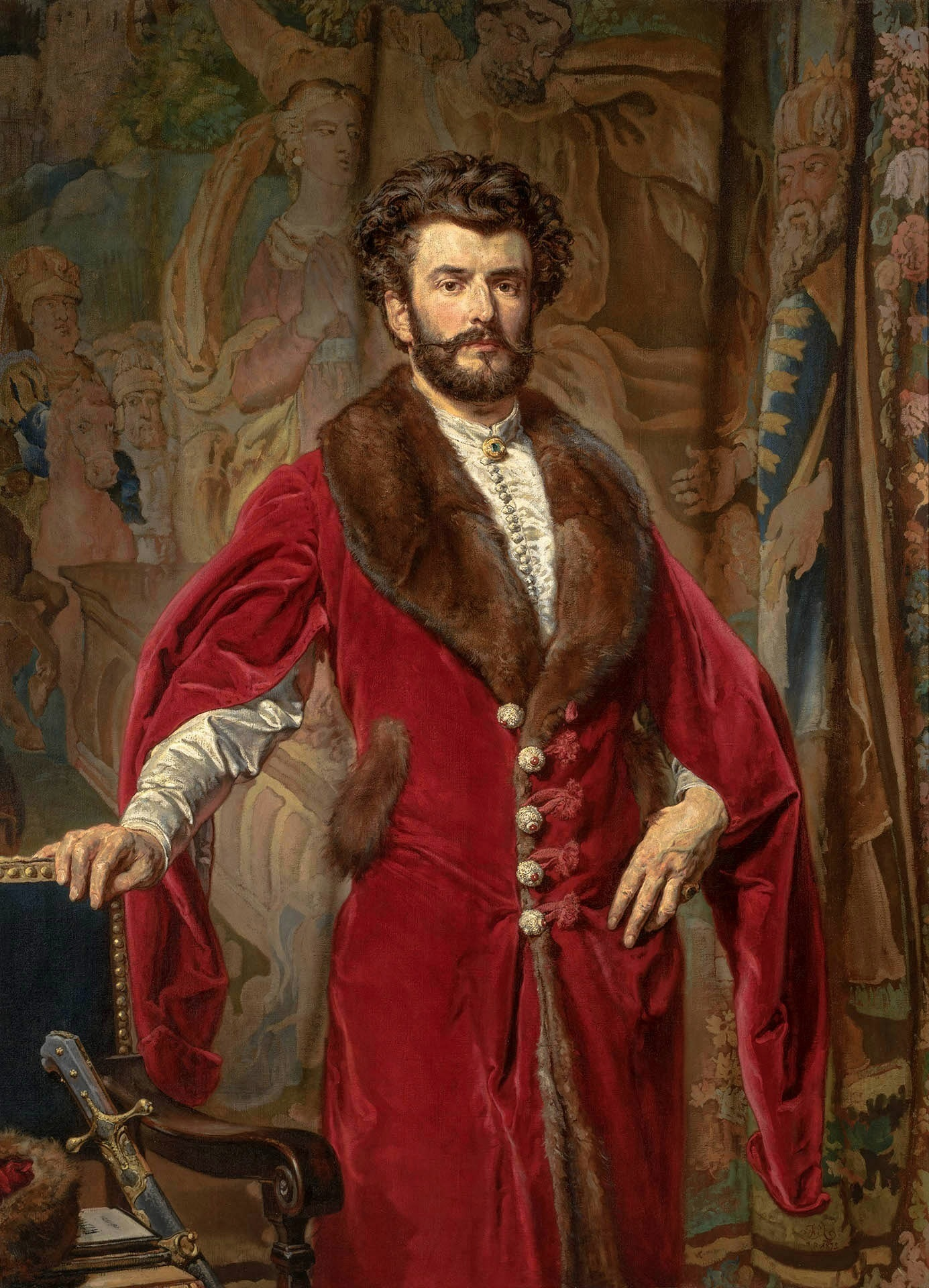
Portrait of Józef Ciechoński, Jan Matejko

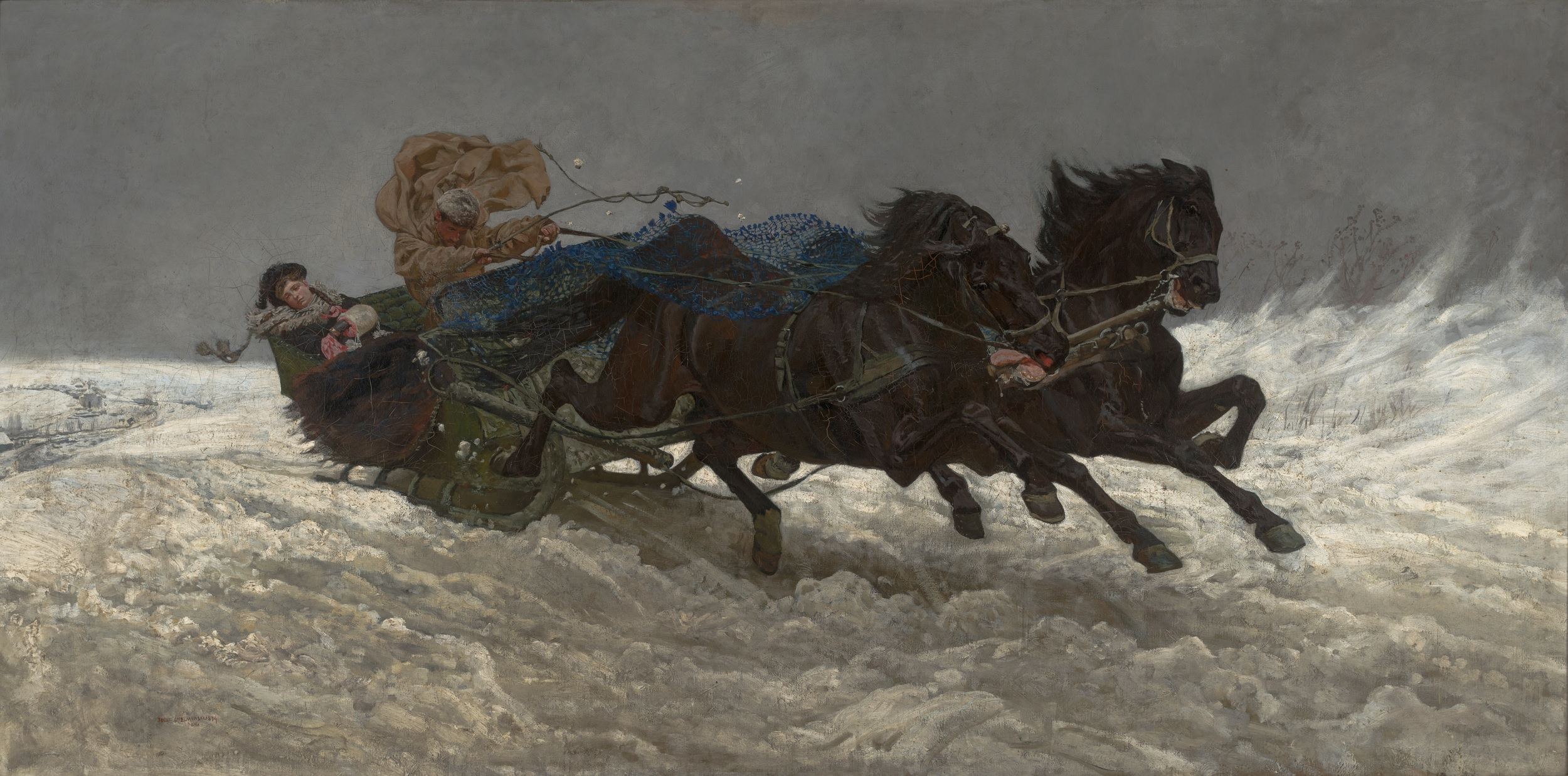
Sleigh Ride, Józef Chełmoński

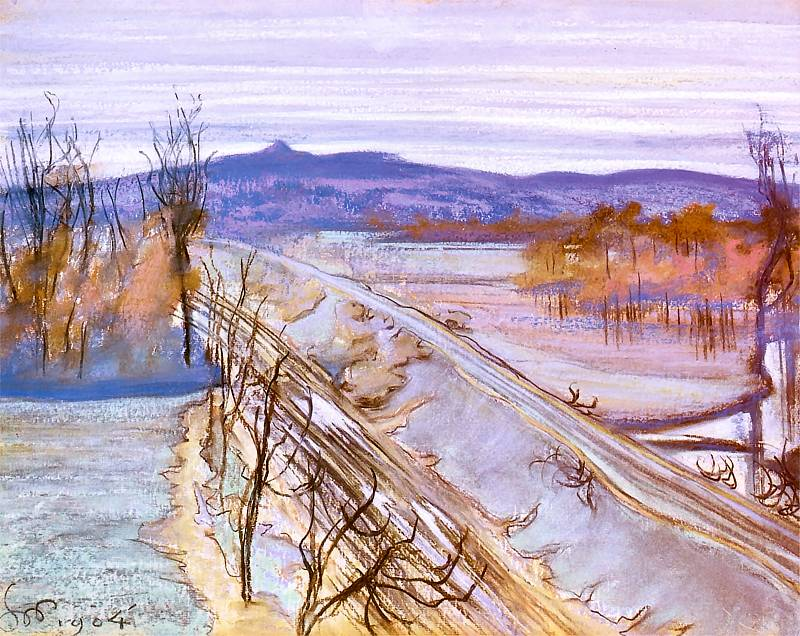
View of Kościuszko Mound, Stanisław Wyspiański

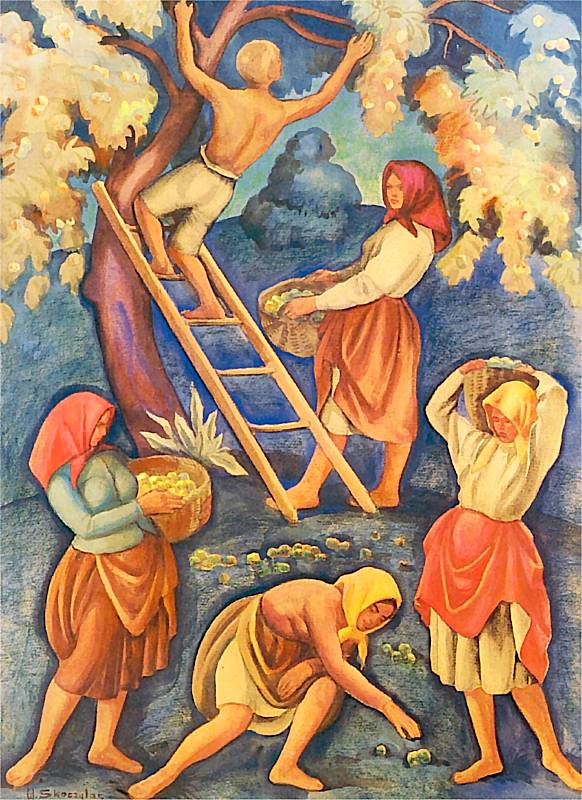
Fruit Picking, Władysław Skoczylas

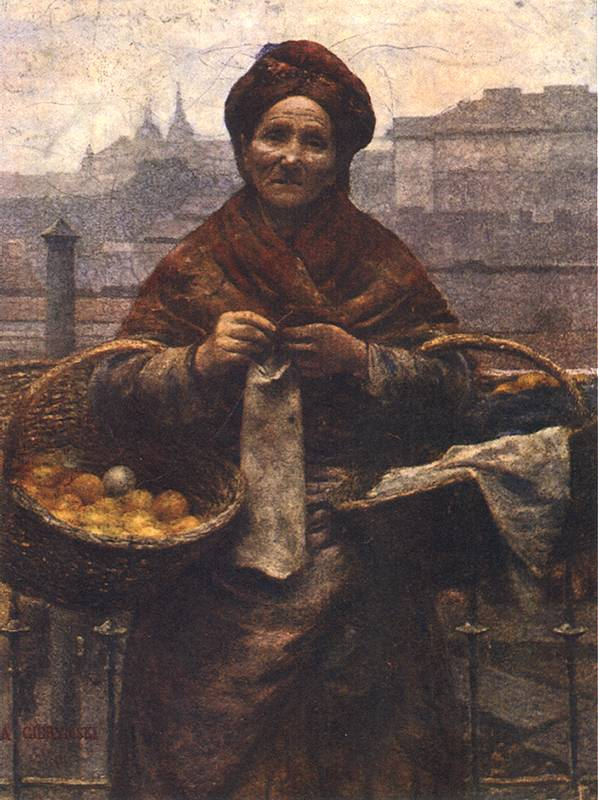
Jewess with Lemons, Aleksander Gierymski

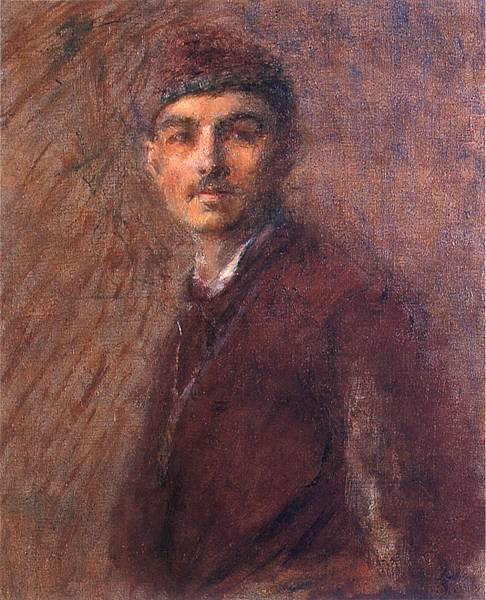
Self-portrait, Władysław Podkowiński

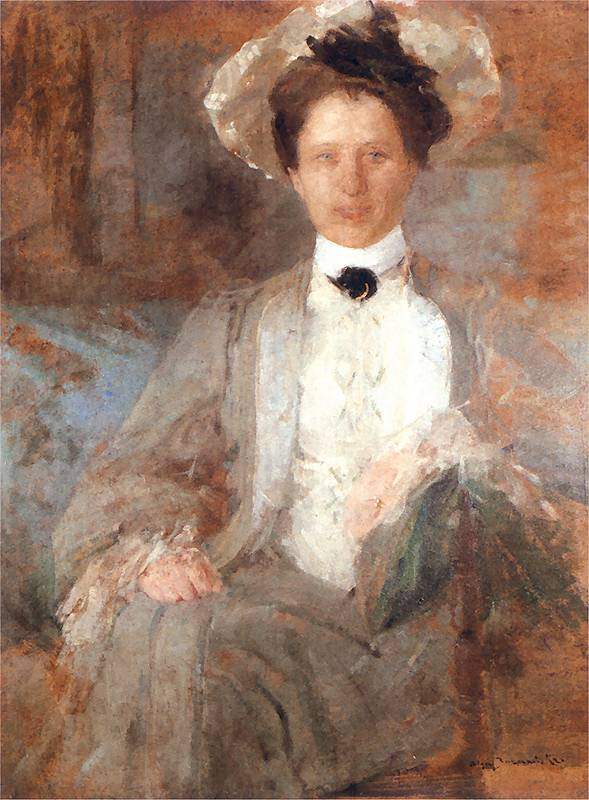
Portrait of a Lady in a Hat, Olga Boznańska

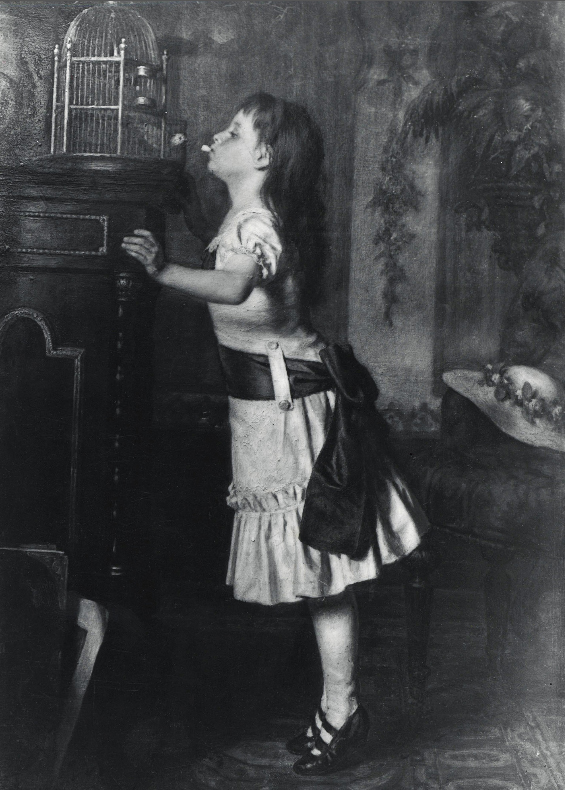
Girl with Canary, Leopold Loeffler. Owned by the museum, lost between 1939 and 1945, returned in 2015.

== Works and publications ==
- "O muzeum. Historia". www.muzeumslaskie.pl.
- Wojciech Janota: Katowice między wojnami. Miasto i jego sprawy 1922–1939. Łódź: Księży Młyn, 2010, s. 110, 111. ISBN 978-83-7729-021-7.
