= Polish art =

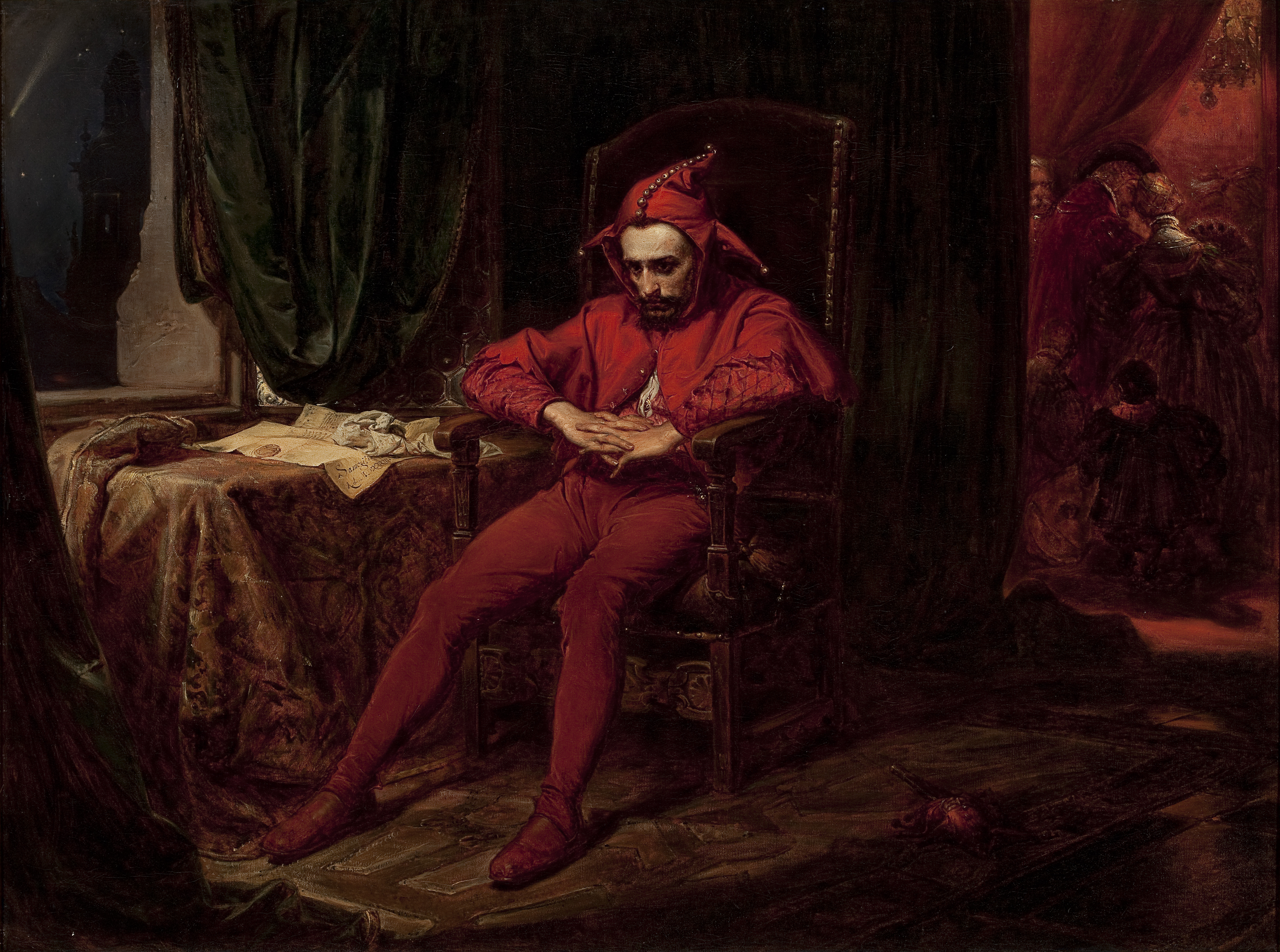
Stańczyk (1862), painted by Jan Matejko

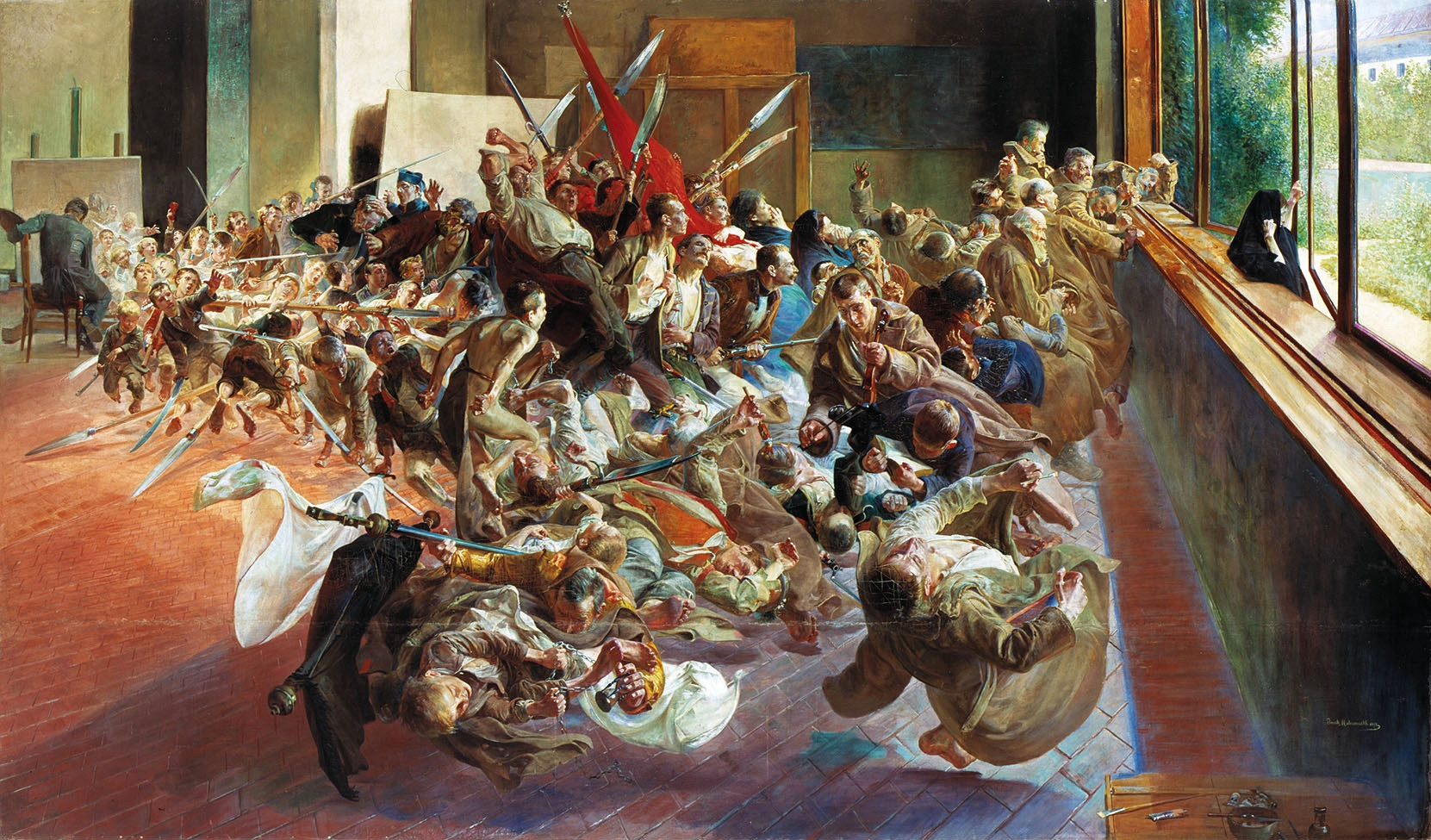
Melancholy (1894), by Jacek Malczewski

Art in Poland refers to all forms of visual art in or associated with Poland.

== Nineteenth century ==
Polish art has often reflected European trends while maintaining its unique character. The Kraków school of history painting developed by Jan Matejko produced monumental portrayals of significant events and customs throughout Polish history. He is referred to as the most famous Polish painter or even as the "national painter" of Poland. Stanisław Witkiewicz was an ardent supporter of Realism in Polish art, its main representative being Jozef Chełmoński.

The Młoda Polska (Young Poland) movement witnessed the birth of modern Polish art and engaged in a great deal of formal experimentation led by Jacek Malczewski (Symbolism), Stanisław Wyspiański, Józef Mehoffer, and a group of Polish Impressionists.

== Twentieth century ==
Artists of the twentieth-century Avant-Garde represented various schools and life. The art of Tadeusz Makowski was influenced by Cubism; while Władysław Strzemiński and Henryk Stażewski worked within the Constructivist idiom. Distinguished contemporary artists include Roman Opałka, Leon Tarasewicz, Jerzy Nowosielski, Wojciech Siudmak, Mirosław Bałka, and Katarzyna Kozyra and Zbigniew Wąsiel in the younger generation. Tamara de Lempicka was a Polish artist creating Art Déco paintings. Józef Czajkowski was an artist of many forms, including painting, architecture, and furniture design. The most celebrated Polish sculptors include Xawery Dunikowski, Katarzyna Kobro, Alina Szapocznikow and Magdalena Abakanowicz. Since the inter-war years, Polish art and documentary photography has enjoyed worldwide recognition.

After the Second World War in Poland only few famous artists like painters Andrzej Wróblewski, Bronisław Linke and film director Andrzej Wajda (recipient of an Honorary Oscar) commemorated the war's victims of the Nazi Holocaust, Warsaw Ghetto Uprising and Warsaw Uprising.

Kapists (Jan Cybis, Jan Szancenbach, Artur Nacht-Samborski, Hanna Rudzka-Cybisowa), Grupa Krakowska (Tadeusz Kantor, Maria Jarema, Jerzy Nowosielski), individuals like Piotr Potworowski, Władysław Hasior, Ludwik Konarzewski (junior), Stefan Knapp, Jerzy Duda-Gracz, Zdzisław Beksiński were some important Polish post-war painters.

In the sixties the Polish Poster School was formed, with Henryk Tomaszewski and Waldemar Świerzy at its head.

== Contemporary art since 1989 ==
Some of the most important representatives of contemporary art are Wilhelm Sasnal, Rafał Bujnowski, Józef Robakowski, Paweł Althamer, Artur Żmijewski, Mirosław Bałka, Leszek Knaflewski, Robert Kuśmirowski, Zuzanna Janin, Krzysztof Wodiczko, Paulina Ołowska, Katarzyna Kozyra, Joanna Rajkowska, Gruppa Azorro.

Independent galleries, mainly in Warsaw, Krakow, and Poznań, play an important role. In many cities museums of modern art are being built, gathering not only national but also international collections (Krakow, Wrocław, and Toruń). In Warsaw, work is underway to build the Museum of Modern Art, which operates a temporary building, creating an international collection of contemporary art. It is open to the public since 2013.

== Gallery ==
Leading Polish painters
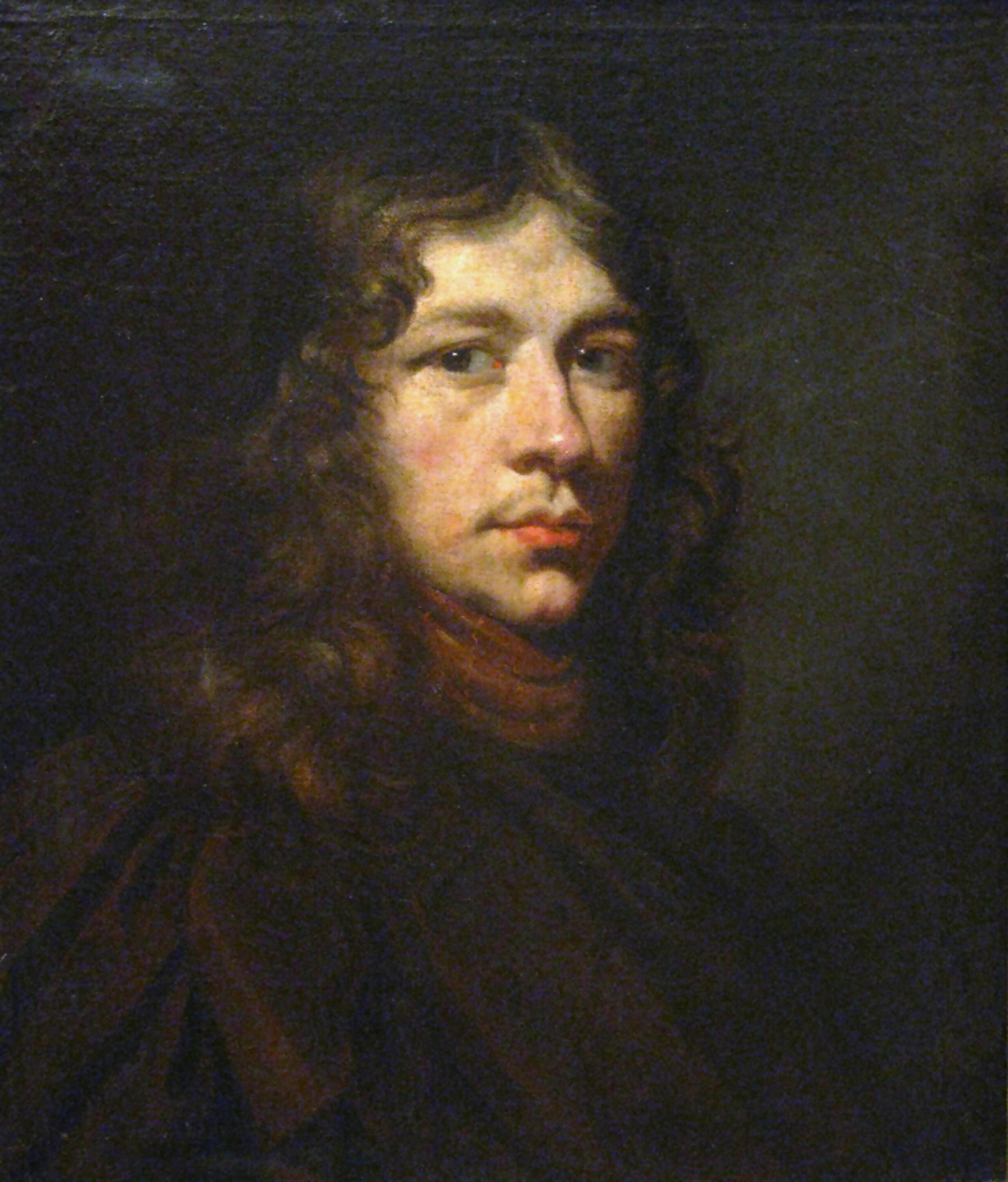
Schultz
(1615–1683)

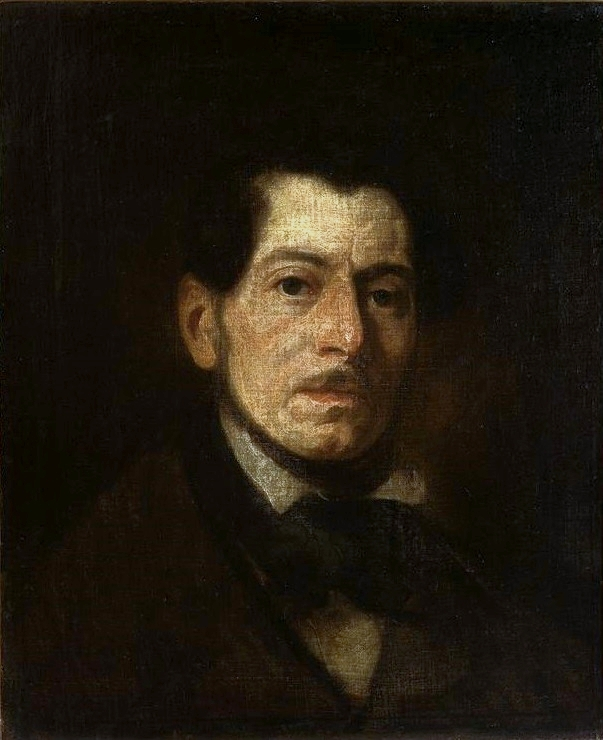
Michałowski
(1800–1855)

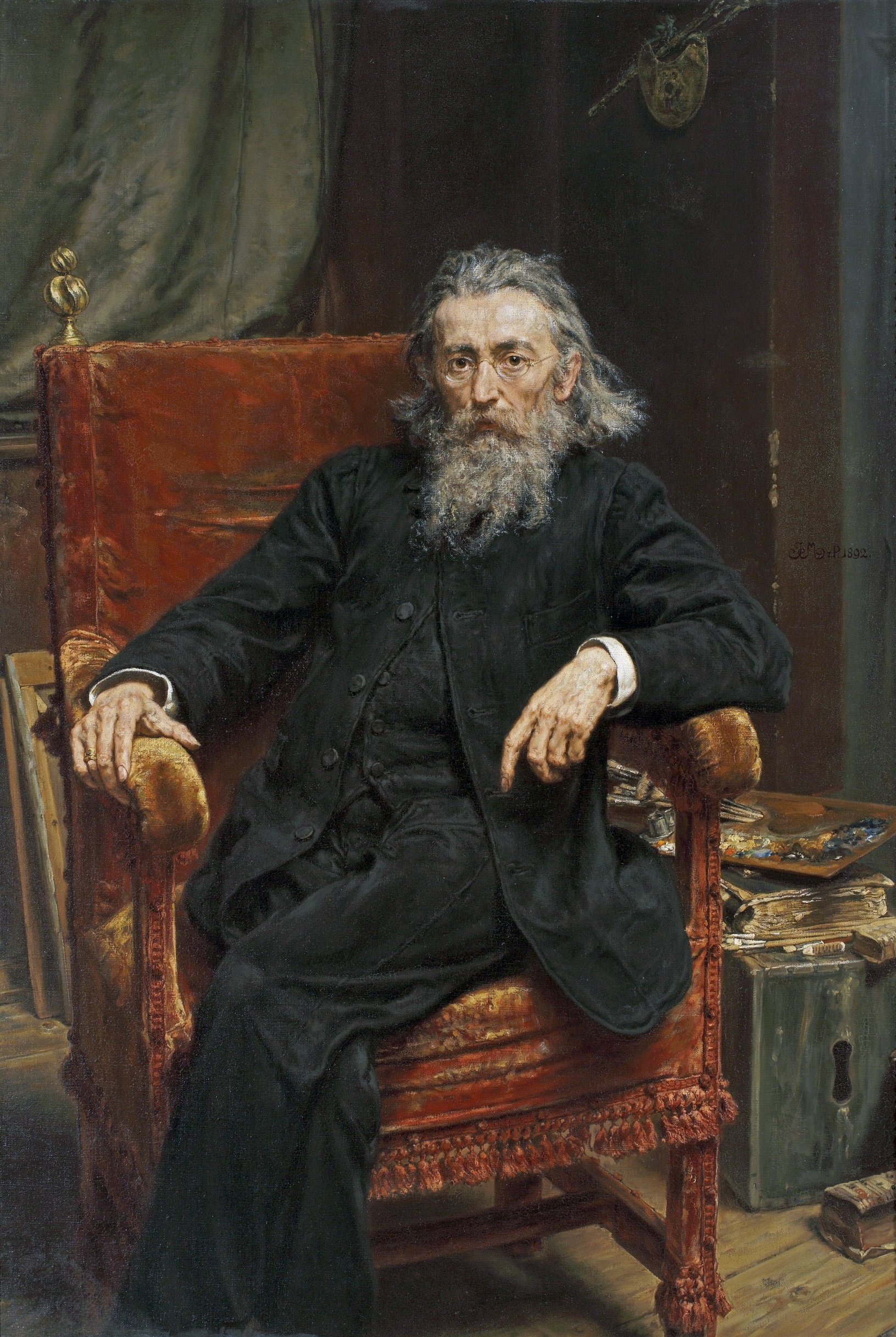
Matejko
(1838–1893)

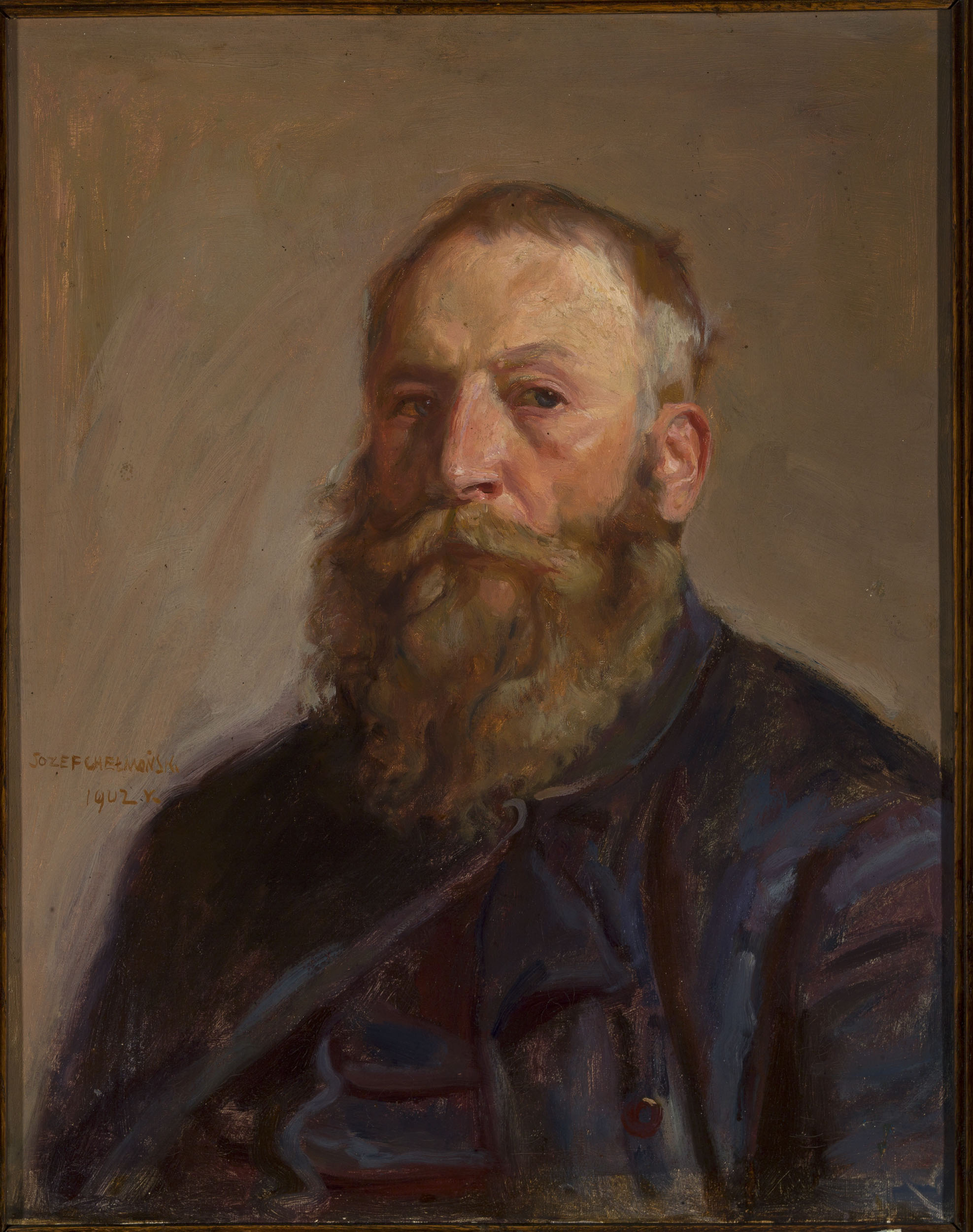
Chełmoński
(1849–1914)

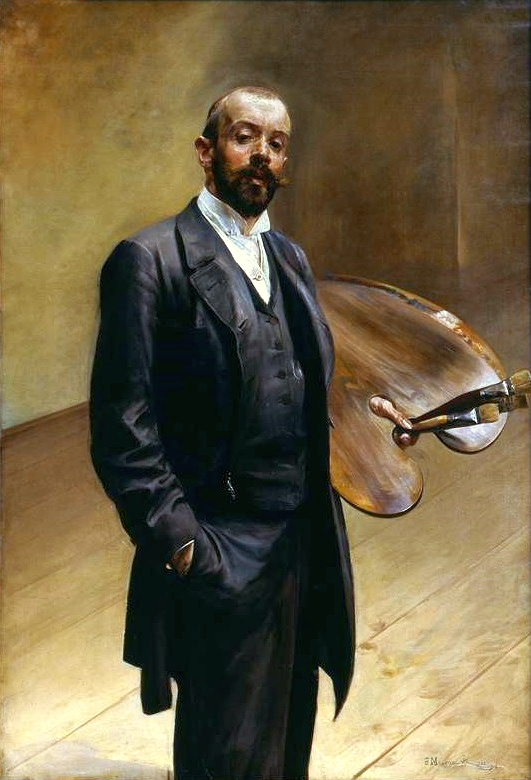
Malczewski
(1854–1929)
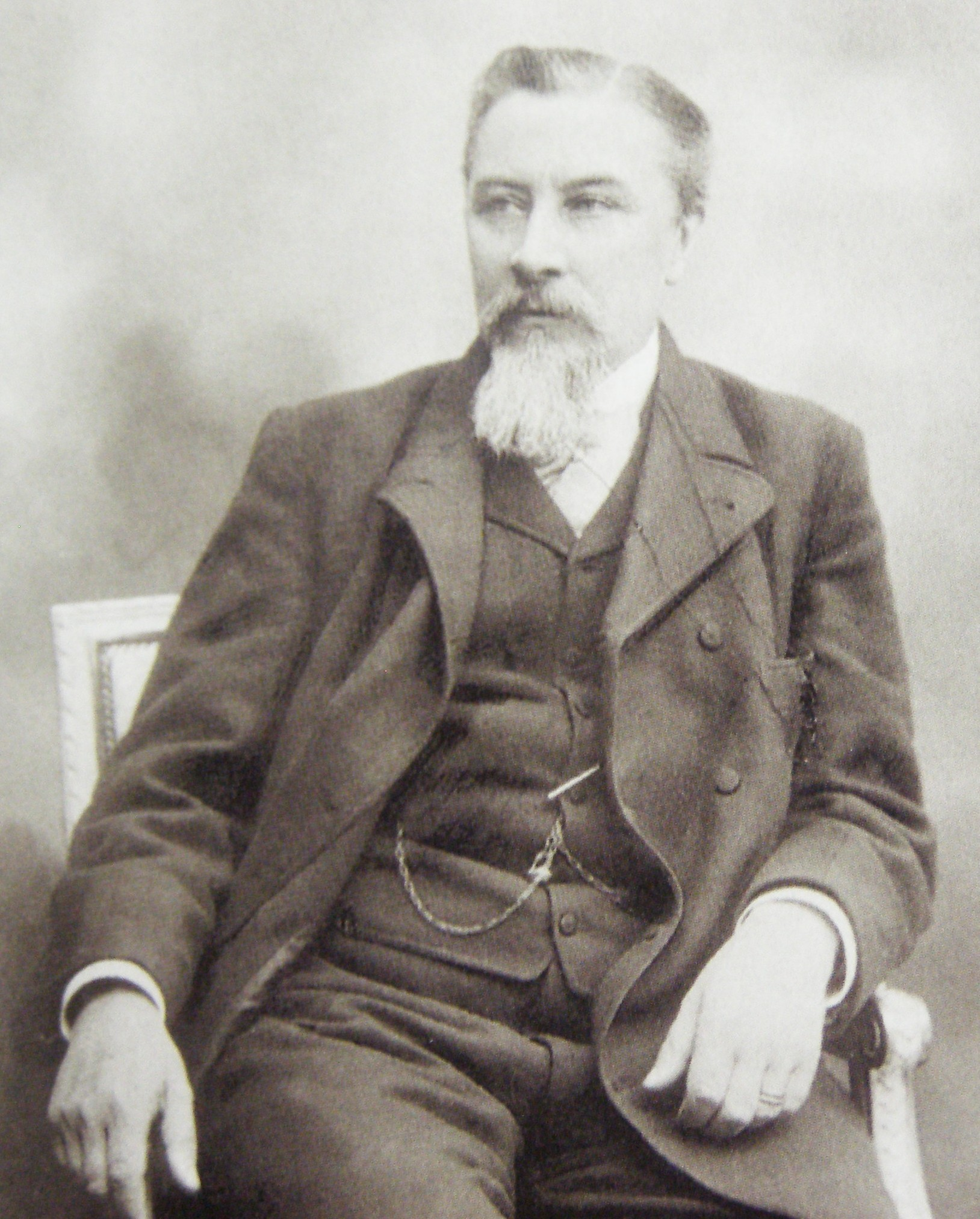
Siemiradzki
(1843–1902)

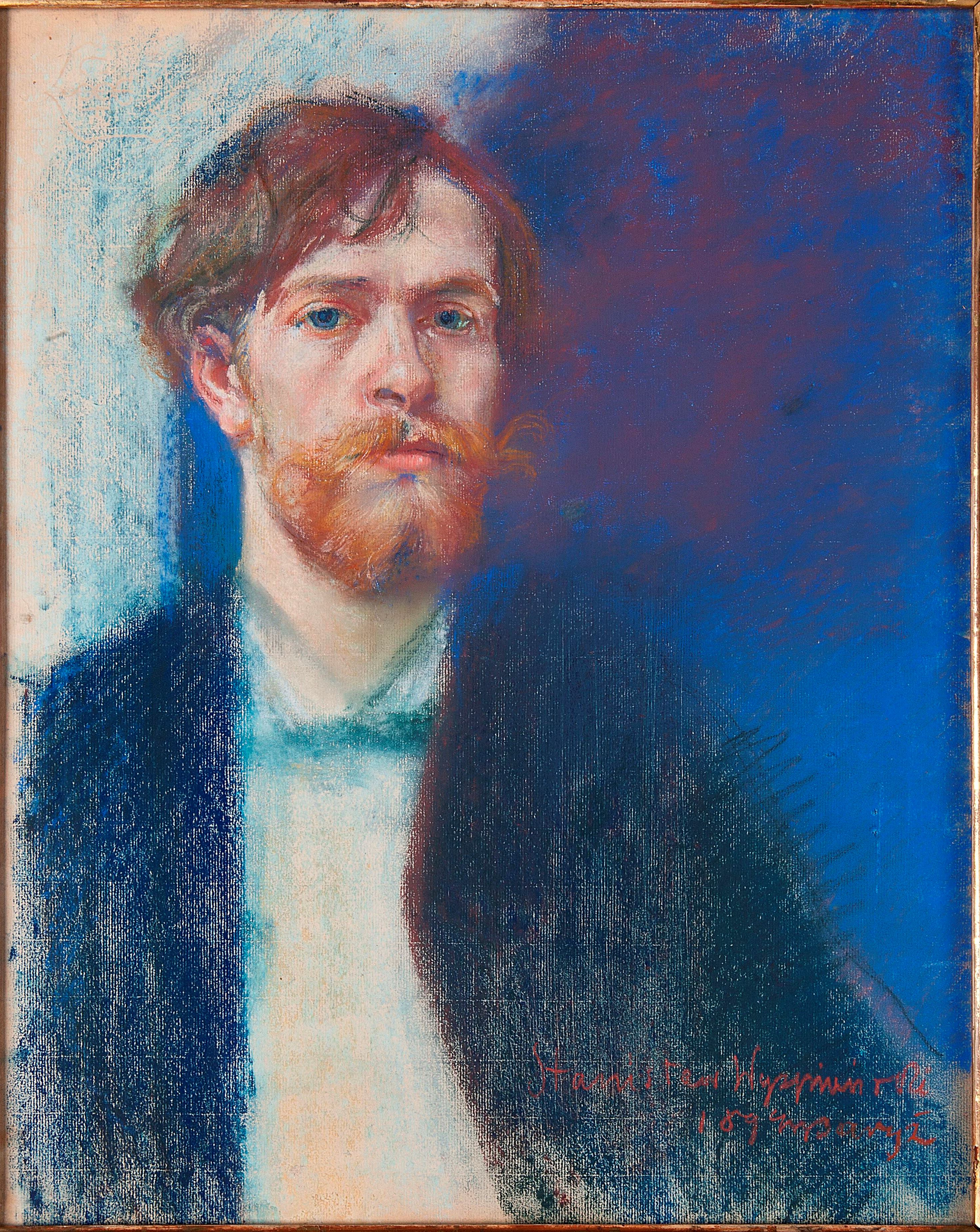
Wyspiański
(1869–1907)

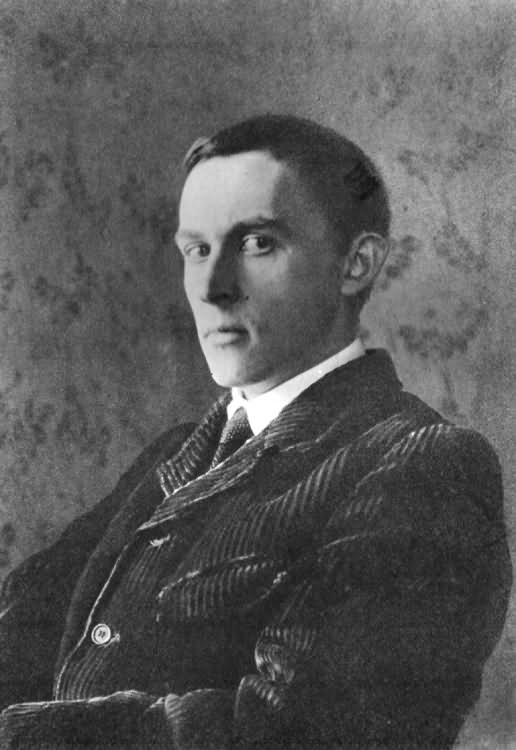
Witkiewicz "Witkacy"
(1885–1939)

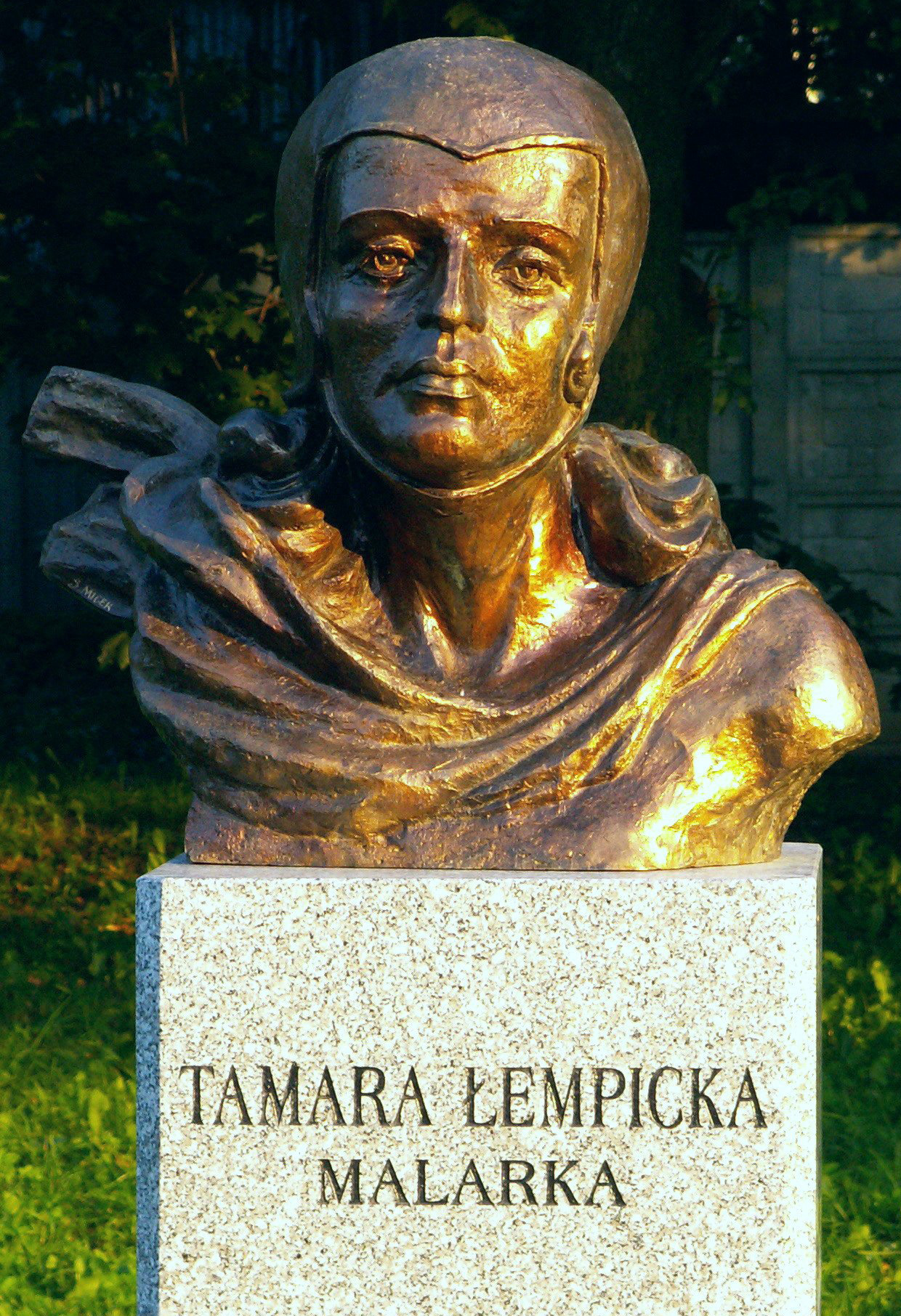
Lempicka
(1898–1980)

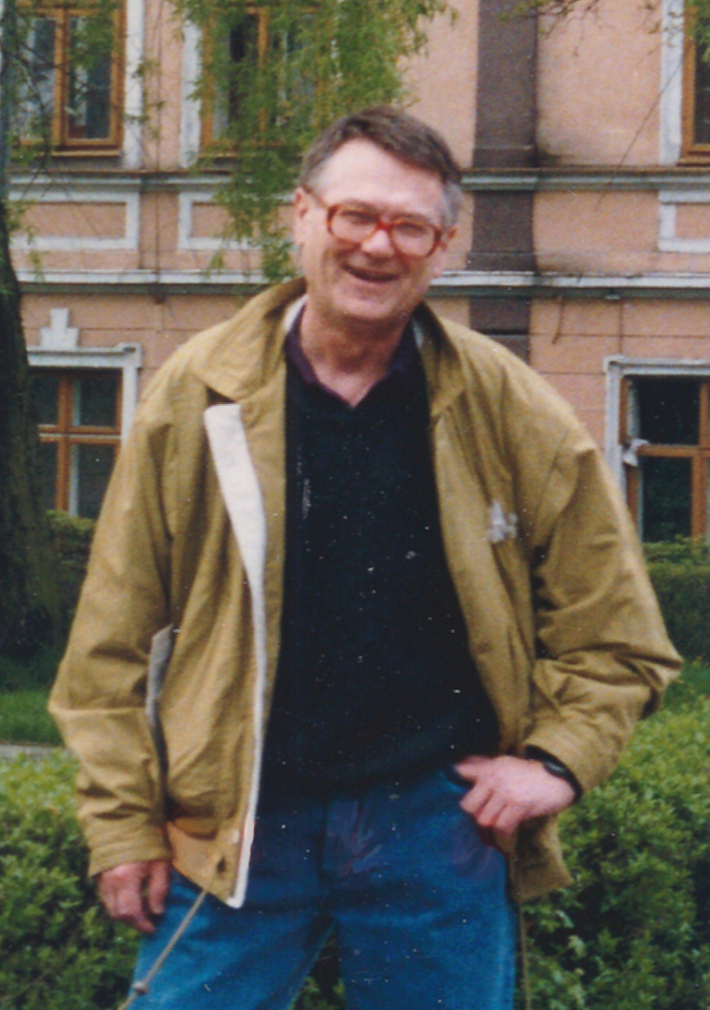
Beksiński
(1929–2005)

== See also ==
- Architecture of Poland
- Cinema of Poland
- List of Polish painters
- Polish comics
