= Marya Lilien =

Polish architect, School of the Art Institute of Chicago professor

- Born: 27 March 1900 or 1901; Lviv
- Died: 12 January 1998; Zakopane
- Occupations: architect, professor

Marya Lilien, also Maria Lilien-Czarnecka (27 March 1900 or 1901 – 12 January 1998) was a Polish architect, university professor and the first woman architect to apprentice under Frank Lloyd Wright. She created and headed the Department of Interior Design at the School of the Art Institute of Chicago.

== Early life and education ==
Marya Lilien was born on 27 March 1900 or 1901, in Lviv, in a Polish-Jewish family of Adolf Lilien (1863–1911) and Emma née Nierenstein (1867–1934). Her siblings were the economist, lawyer and diplomat Artur Lilien-Brzozdowiecki and the singer Klara Janina Bloomfield (1893–1965). Marya completed studies in architecture at the Lviv Polytechnic, where she studied descriptive geometry under Kazimierz Bartel. She was among the first women to graduate from the university.

== Career ==
Lilien belonged to the young artistic circles of Lviv. In the first half of the 1930s she worked as an architect in Warsaw and Lviv, then traveled to the US in 1935. Upon being invited by Frank Lloyd Wright, who offered her a scholarship, she joined the Taliesin studio and became the first woman apprentice under Wright.

Lilien returned to Poland in the late 1930s. At the start of World War II she was in Lviv, but she managed to escape to the US via Romania and Italy, traveling on a last ship from Naples before Italy went to war. She received a travel visa to come to America thanks to Wright's help. In 1941, she spent some time at Taliesin. As she did not want to overstay her welcome, she moved to Chicago, where she started teaching at the School of the Art Institute, where she founded its interior architecture program and was subsequently appointed Head of the Department of Interior Design. Her focus was to treat interior architecture as its own field of architecture instead of just perceiving it as decoration; her program changed the nationwide approach to teaching the subject. She taught at the university for over 25 years, becoming a mentor to generations of architecture students. Eventually, she became a US citizen. After retiring from the School of the Art Institute in 1967, she gave classes in history of architecture at Columbia College Chicago.

Apart from teaching, Lilien also engaged in promoting Polish art. In 1943, together with Maria Werten, she organized an exhibition of Polish woodcuts at the Art Institute of Chicago. She was also the initiator of the Treasures from Poland exhibition presented in 1966 at the Art Institute to commemorate the millennium of the Polish State. Her Chicago home became an artistic salon where she welcomed Polish artists and immigrants, such as Arthur Rubinstein, Witold Lutosławski, Witold Rowicki, Wanda Wiłkomirska, Krzysztof Penderecki, Mira Zimińska and Walentyna Janta-Połczyńska. She was friends with Felicja Krance.

Lilien was a member of the board of directors of the Kosciuszko Foundation, a member of the Chicago Architectural Foundation and the Polish Institute of Arts and Sciences of America, as well as an honorary member of the Polish Arts Club of Chicago.

Her name bears The Marya Lilien Foundation for the Advancement of Interior Design which awards scholarships to the best students of interior architecture. It was founded in the late 1960s or in the 1970s.

== Personal life ==
A portrait of Marya Lilien painted by Polish artist Antoni Michalak, called Lady in Blue Gloves, was exhibited in the late 1930s at the Venice Biennale, then in Pittsburgh and finally at the 1939 New York World's Fair. Later, it was also shown at the Carnegie Museum of Art.

Marya Lilien was married to Wlodzimierz Czarnecki. She returned to Poland at the end of her life. She died on 12 January 1998 in Zakopane.
