= Lilien =

Lilien is a surname. Notable people with the surname include:

- Ephraim Moses Lilien (1874–1925), American art nouveau illustrator and printmaker
- Gary Lilien, American management professor
- Kurt Lilien (1882–1943), German actor
- Marya Lilien (1900 or 1901–1998), Polish architect
