= Marian Szczyrbuła =

Polish painter (1899–1942)

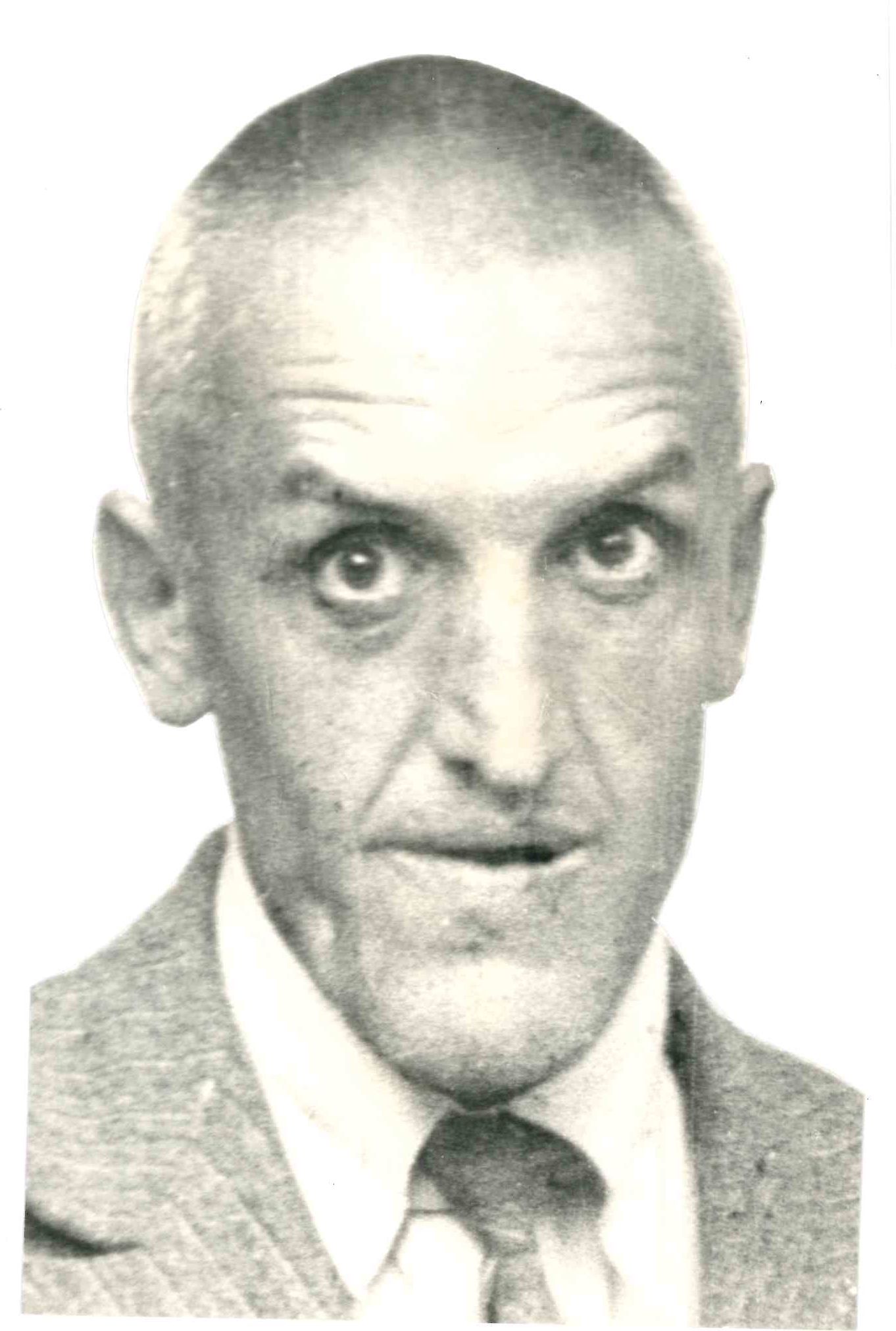
- Born: 10 October 1899; Kraków, Austria-Hungary (now Poland)
- Died: 1942 (aged 42–43); Tobolsk, Russian SFSR, Soviet Union (now Russia)
- Occupations: Painter, drawing teacher

Marian Szczyrbuła (10 October 1899 – winter 1942), was a Polish painter, a member of formism(polish expressionism) and of Polish Colourism (also called kapism).

== Biography ==
From 1916 to 1921, Szczyrbuła studied art at Jan Matejko Academy of Fine Arts under the supervision of Józef Mehoffer and Wojciech Weiss. During his studies, he was involved in the futurist movement in Kraków as he became friends with Bruno Jasieński and Stanisław Młodożeniec. In the years 1922–1924 he was a drawing teacher at the teacher's seminary in Tarnopol. After obtaining a national grant, he went to Paris in September 1924 together with a group of painters called the Kapists. After coming back to Poland in 1925, he obtained a teacher position in Stryj, where he worked until 1930. Following a one year's course of manual works in Warsaw, he first worked for one year in Vilnius, and was then moved to Wilejka. In 1935 he was appointed teacher at the Piramowicz high school in Dzisna. While dedicating himself to his teaching work, he was keeping contact with his colleagues and friends from the academy and he participated to exhibitions. After the occupation of the eastern territory of Poland by USSR in September 1939, he was teaching drawing at the newly created Belarusian school in Dzisna. He was arrested in spring 1941 by the Soviet authorities and deported to Tobolsk in Siberia, together with other members of the local Polish intelligentsia. He died in Tobolsk during the winter of 1941–1942, where his frozen body was found in the street according to the accounts of survivors. A memorial notice of Marian Szczyrbuła can be found on the Szczyrbuła family grave at the Rakowicki Cemetery in Kraków.

== Work ==
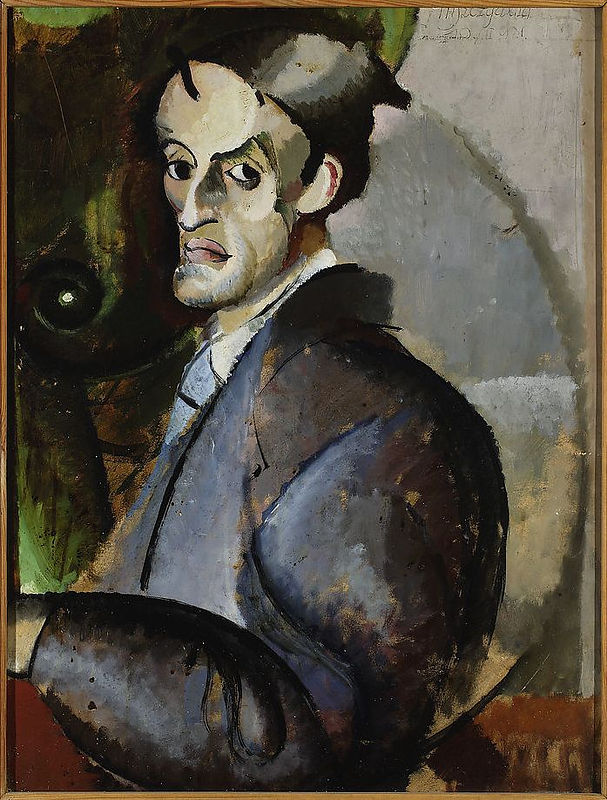
Marian Szczyrbuła – Self-portrait (1921) – National Museum in Warsaw

Before the war he mainly exhibited his works with the Cracovian group « Zwornik » in Kraków and in Lwów, and until 1939 he sent his paintings to the yearly exhibitions of the Institute for the Propaganda of Art in Warsaw. The displayed paintings were dedicated to the landscapes and the architecture of the surroundings of Stryj, Borysław, Drohobycz and the Vilnius Region. The majority of the paintings of the Dzisna period were most probably burnt in 1944. Marian Szczyrbuła also painted portraits and self-portraits. His paintings are composed of multicoloured stains thrown by brush strokes of various intensities and directions. His works chiefly contain dark shades, but sometimes also strong color dissonances. However, shapes are mostly smoothed, as can be expected from a former formist who later became a colorist.

The paintings by Marian Szczyrbuła were exhibited after the war in the frame of several thematical exhibitions like for example « Expressionism in Polish Art », « Formists », « The Paris Committee », as well as posthumous exhibitions dedicated to him.

Marian Szczyrbuła - Architecture of a small town, 1924, National Museum in Warsaw

Nowadays, the artist's paintings are mainly displayed at the National Museum in Warsaw, at the National Museum in Kraków, at the National Museum in Wrocław, at the Museum of Art in Łódź, at the National Museum in Poznań, at the National Museum in Kielce, at the Museum of Upper Silesia in Bytom, at the Museum of Central Pomerania in Słupsk, at the Museum of Silesia in Opole, at the Regional Museum in Bydgoszcz, at the National Museum in Szczecin, at the Podlaskie Museum in Białystok, at the Museum Ziemi Lubuskiej in Zielona Góra, at the National Museum in Lublin as well as in private collections.

== Bibliography ==
- Agnieszka Sobór-Żulichowska, Marian Szczyrbuła – Formista i kolorysta, master thesis under the direction of Dr. Tomasz Gryglewicz. Institute of Art History, Department of History of the Jagiellon University in Kraków, 1998
- Joanna Pollakówna, Wanda M. Rudzińska, Malarstwo Polskie między wojnami 1918–1939, Warsaw, 1982
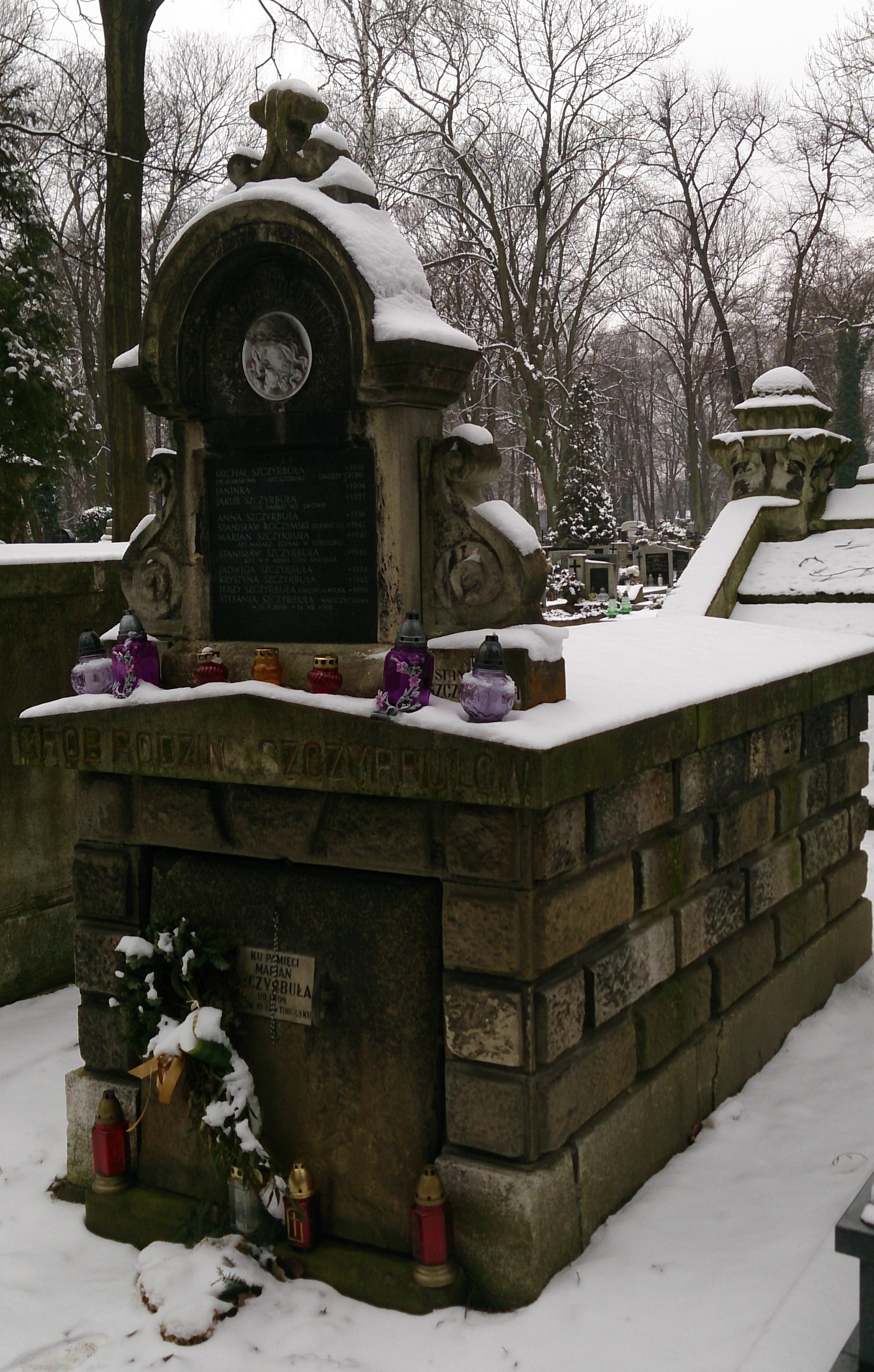
- Szczyrbuła family grave at the Rakowicki Cemetery in Kraków with a memorial notice of Marian Szczyrbuła
  Zofia Iskierska, Państwowe Gimnazjum i Liceum Ogólnokształcące w Dziśnie im. ks. Grzegorza Piramowicza, Bydgoszcz 2003. ISBN 83-87865-38-9.
- Internetowy polski słownik biograficzny: https://www.ipsb.nina.gov.pl/a/biografia/marian-szczyrbula-1899-1942-malarz-rysownik-pedagog.
