= Jan Rubczak =

Polish artist (1882–1942)

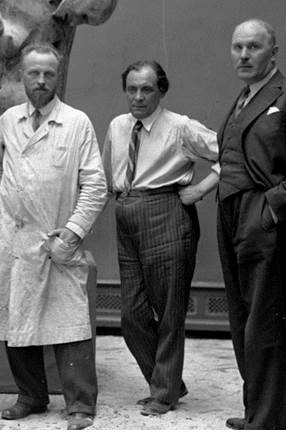
Jan Rubczak (center) at an exhibition in 1931.

Jan Rubczak (18 January 1882, Stanisławów – 27 May 1942, Auschwitz) was a Polish Postimpressionist painter and engraver.

== Biography ==
From 1904 to 1911, he was enrolled at the Kraków Academy of Fine Arts, where he studied with Florian Cynk and Józef Pankiewicz. Later, he attended the Academy of Visual Arts in Leipzig and the Académie Colarossi in Paris. In 1911, he exhibited at the Salon d'Automne and had his first solo exhibition in 1913. The following year, he displayed his etchings at the Venice Biennale.

He made numerous trips to Brittany and Normandy, where he painted coastal scenes. His agent and patron was the well-known poet and art dealer, Léopold Zborowski. In 1915, he became one of the co-founders of the "Société des Artistes Polonaise". After 1917, he ran his own drawing school in Paris. He continued to exhibit throughout Poland and internationally.

In 1924, he returned to a newly independent Poland, where he taught at the "Free School of Painting and Drawing". The following year, he was one of the co-founders of the artists guild, "Jednoróg" (Unicorn). From 1931 to 1932, he worked at the Kraków Academy as an assistant to Jan Wojnarski. During this time, he became member of the Kraków Society of Friends of Fine Arts, where he served in an organizational capacity.

In 1942, after a long convalescence from a heart ailment, he left his home to visit a café that was frequented by artists and writers and got caught up in a Gestapo raid. He and a group of other "degenerate" artists were taken to Montelupich Prison, then transferred to Auschwitz, where he was shot to death.

== Selected paintings ==
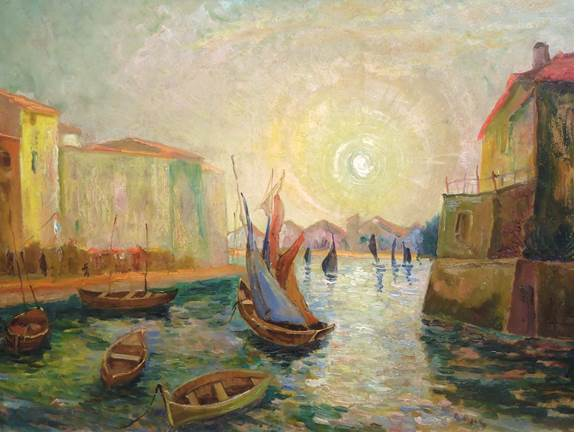
Townscape at the Seaside, National Museum, Wrocław

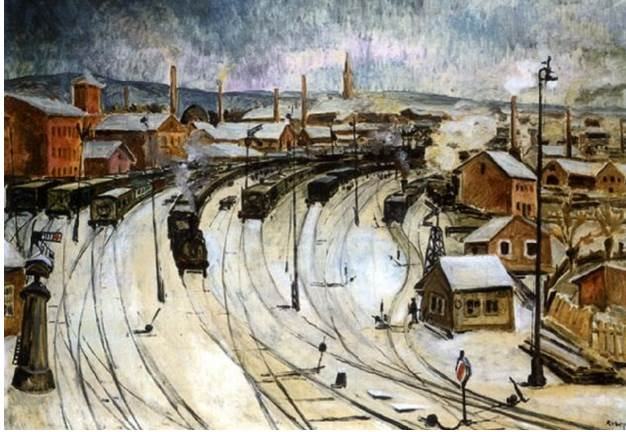
The Kraków-Płaszów Railway

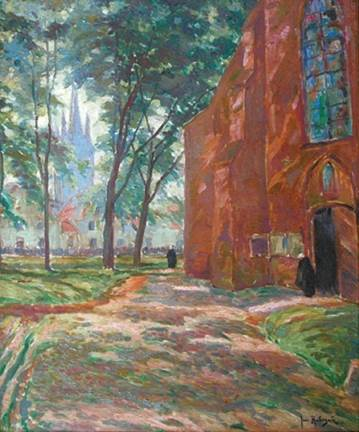
Landscape with Two Churches

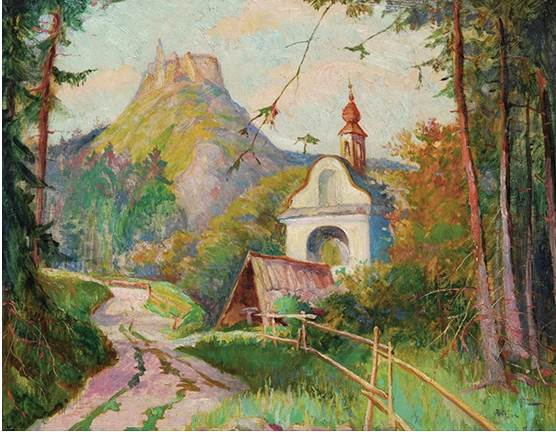
Chapel with Ruins
