= Wróblin =

Wróblin Fröbel
- Village
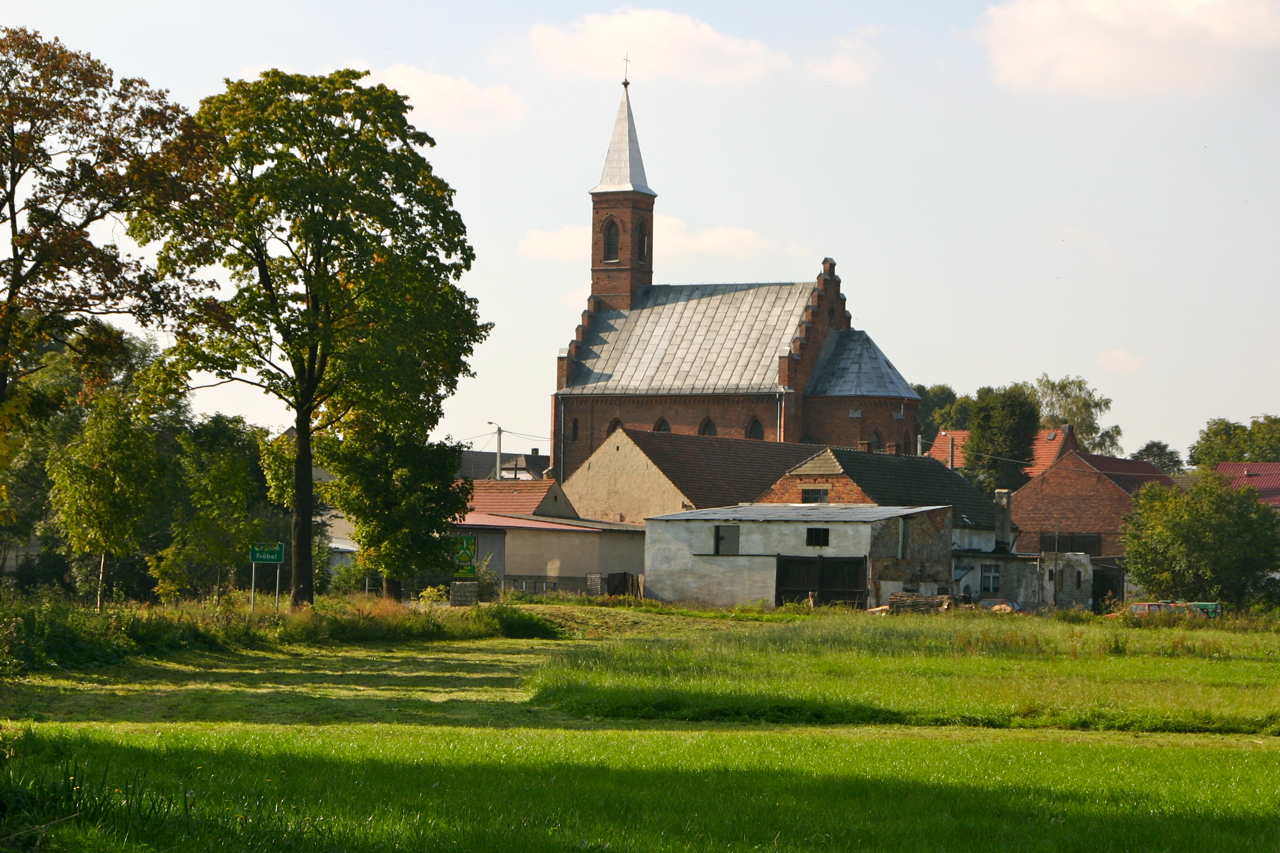
- Wróblin

- Location within Poland
- Coordinates: 50°18′54″N 17°55′58″E
- Country: Poland
- Voivodeship: Opole
- County: Prudnik
- Gmina: Głogówek
- First mentioned: 1175

Population
  - Total: 440
- Time zone: UTC+1 (CET)
  - Summer (DST): UTC+2 (CEST)
- Vehicle registration: OPR

Wróblin [ˈvrublin], additional name in German: Fröbel, is a village in the administrative district of Gmina Głogówek, within Prudnik County, Opole Voivodeship, in southern Poland, close to the Czech border.

== History ==
The earliest record of the village comes from 1175. The name is of Polish origin, and comes from the word wróbel, which means "sparrow". In the past, it was known in Polish as Wróblin and Wróblina.

In the 1970s, a parish music orchestra was established, which includes the only rural symphony orchestra in Poland.

Since 2009, in addition to the official Polish language, German has also been recognized as an additional secondary language.

== Notable people ==
- Jan Cybis (1897–1972), painter and art teacher

== See also ==
- Prudnik Land
