= American Council for Polish Culture =

U.S. non-profit organization

The American Council for Polish Culture
- Established: 1948
- President: Raymond Glembocki
- Address: 817 Berkshire Rd, Grosse Pointe Park, MI 48230
- Location: Grosse Pointe Park, Michigan
- Website: polishcultureacpc.org

The American Council for Polish Culture (ACPC) is a national non-profit, charitable, cultural and educational organization that serves as a network and body of national leadership among affiliated Polish-American cultural organizations throughout the United States.

== History ==
Founded in 1948 in Detroit as the American Council of Polish Cultural Clubs, by early 2000s the Council currently represented the interests of some 35 to 40 affiliated organizations located in the United States. Its oldest affiliated organization, the Polish Arts Club of Chicago, was established in 1928.

ACPC is currently headquartered in Grosse Pointe Park, Michigan.

== American Center of Polish Culture ==
In 1989 the ACPC established the American Center of Polish Culture which opened its doors in 1991 in Washington, D.C. The American Center of Polish Culture has, primarily, an educational function providing programs and exhibitions, but it also acts as a central point for the lobbying activities of the ACPC. The first director, taking office in 1991, was Dr. Kaya Mirecka-Ploss, who was then president of the ACPC.

== Awards, scholarships, etc. ==
Currently ACPC offers the following scholarship opportunities:

- The Eye of the Eagle: Wladyslaw Zachariasiewicz Memorial Scholarship for American students of Polish descent, and those interested in Poland, pursuing a career in journalism and/or mass media communications.
- ACPC Summer Study Scholarship: For American students of Polish descent to participate in a summer study program at any one of Poland's fine universities or other institutions that offer such programs.
- Pulaski Scholarship for Advanced Studies: $5,000 for graduate students of Polish descent enrolled at an accredited university in the United States, who have completed at least one year of studies at the graduate level.
- Leonard Skowronski Polish Studies Scholarship: For students pursuing some Polish studies (major may be in other fields) at universities in the United States, who have completed at least two years of college or university work at an accredited institution.

== Affiliate organizations ==
Connecticut

- Polish American Cultural Society of Stamford
- Polish Cultural Club of Greater Hartford

District of Columbia

- Polish American Arts Association of Washington DC

Florida

- Citrus County Polish Heritage Club
- American Institute of Polish Culture, Pinellas County

Illinois

- Polish Arts Club of Chicago

Indiana

- Chopin Fine Arts Club, South Bend

Massachusetts

- Polish Cultural Foundation, Boston

Michigan

- Friends of Polish Art, Detroit

Minnesota

- Polish American Cultural Institute of Minnesota

Missouri

- Polish American Society of Metro St. Louis

New Jersey

- Polish Arts Club of Trenton Founded 1946

New York

- Kopernik Polish Cultural Society
- Kopernik Memorial Assoc. of Central New York
- Polish Arts Club, Elmira
- Polish Heritage Club of Syracuse, Inc.
- Polish Heritage Society of Rochester

Ohio

- Cleveland Society of Poles
- Jamestown Colony of Poles, Cleveland
- Polish American Citizens Club of Akron
- Polish Arts Club of Youngstown

Pennsylvania

- Polish Arts League of Pittsburgh
- Polish Heritage Society of Philadelphia

Texas

- Polish Heritage Center at Panna Maria

Virginia

- Polish American Society of Virginia

Wisconsin

- American Assoc. for Advancement of Polish Culture, Milwaukee

== See also ==
=== Other similar organizations ===
- American Slav Congress, founded 1942
- Polish American Congress (PAC), founded 1945
- Polish American Council, founded 1939 merged into PAC in 1944
- The Kosciuszko Foundation,
- The Copernicus Foundation,
- Polish National Alliance, founded 1880
