= Hanna Rudzka-Cybisowa =

Polish artist (1897–1988)

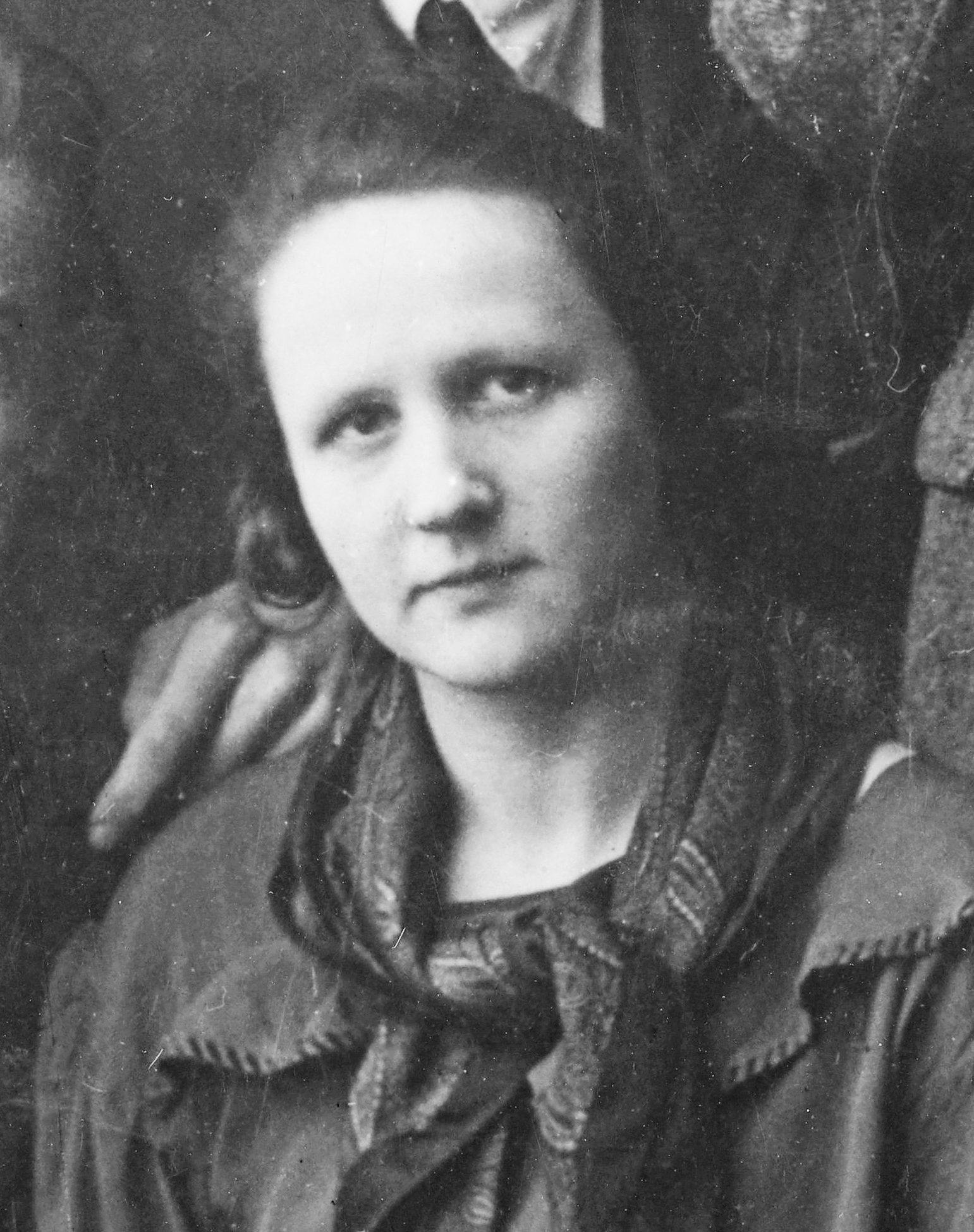
- Born: Hanna Rudzka; 27 June 1897; Mława, Płock Governorate, Congress Poland
- Died: 3 February 1988 (aged 91); Kraków, Kraków Voivodeship, Polish People's Republic
- Known for: Painting
- Spouse: Jan Cybis

Hanna Rudzka-Cybisowa (1897–1988) was a Polish artist and teacher.

== Biography ==
Rudzka-Cybisowa was born on 27 June 1897 in Mława, Poland. She studied at the Academy of Fine Arts in Warsaw where she was taught by Miłosz Kotarbiński. In 1923 Rudzka-Cybisowa became a student of the Polish Impressionist Józef Pankiewicz. In 1924 she traveled to Paris along with a group of Polish students who named themselves the Komitet Paryski (the Paris Committee, also called the Kapists). The same year she married the painter Jan Cybis (1897–1972) who was also part of the Komitet Paryski. The couple stayed in France from 1924 through to 1931.

From 1931 through to 1933 Rudzka-Cybisowa lived in Kraków, returning for a time to Paris where she had a solo show at the Renaissance Gallery. In 1934 her work was included in a Kapists' group show at the Warszawskim Instytucie Propagandy Sztuki (Warsaw Art Propaganda Institute). Rudzka-Cybisowa remained in Poland through the Nazi occupation, continuing to paint. After the liberation she began teaching at the Academy of Fine Arts in Warsaw. The Academy was reestablished after the Warsaw Uprising. She taught there until her retirement in 1967. She was active in the Krakowskiego Okręgu Związku Polskich Artystów Plastyków (Krakow District of the Association of Polish Artists and Designers).

In 1971 the National Museum in Poznań held a retrospective of her work. Rudzka-Cybisowa died on 3 February 1988 in Kraków.
