= Piotr Potworowski =

Polish painter & designer (1898–1962)

Piotr Tadeusz Potworowski (14 June 1898 – 24 April 1962) was a Polish abstract and figurative painter who lived and exhibited in Paris, Poland, Sweden and England. During his seven years in Paris he became personally acquainted with Pablo Picasso, Pierre Bonnard, Jean Cocteau, Constantin Brâncuși and attended for a short time Fernand Léger's studio. In 1943 he settled in London where he joined the London Group and exhibited regularly. In 1948 he was invited to work in the Bath School of Art, in order to bring his experience of twenties Paris to an English art world untouched by the deep changes taking place on the continent. His much-needed European influence on painting, specifically abstraction, was acknowledged by contemporaries including Peter Lanyon, Patrick Heron, Adrian Heath and William Scott.

Potworowski's paintings and constructions were considered some of the finest works of British art in the 1950s. In 1958 he was invited to return to Poland to take up the post of Professor of Painting at Poznań and in 1960 he was a prize winner at the 30th Venice Biennale. He died in Warsaw in 1962. In 1996 a major retrospective exhibition was held at the Polish National Gallery of Contemporary Art in Warsaw consisting of 70 works in oil and 80 sculptures, scenography projects and watercolours.

== Life ==
Piotr Tadeusz Potworowski was born on 14 June 1898, in Warsaw, then part of the Russian Empire. The family owned an engineering factory and a summer villa on the River Wisła. He was considered a "difficult" child and attended a school for the disturbed. His mother was killed in a sledging accident in 1913 and in August 1914 at the start of the war he and his two brothers were sent for safety to relatives in Moscow. His sketches from that period show interest and talent which was put aside when he volunteered for the Polish Cavalry Brigade, part of the Russian Army, fighting first the Germans then the Ukrainians and finally the Bolsheviks.

After the war in 1920 he studied design in the Warsaw University of Technology then in the following year moved to the Academy of Fine Arts in Kraków and discovered French painting. In 1924 he travelled to Paris as a member of Komitet Paryski (KP), a group of young painters, and stayed there for seven years immersing himself in avant garde culture of that period. For a short time he joined the studio of Fernand Léger and was a leader in organising the Bal Polonaise which was attended by Picasso, Braque and other artists. In 1927 he spent three months working on a French commercial schooner and followed this in 1928 with an exhibition of ships at the Claridge Gallery, London.

He married Magdalena Mańkowska in 1929, and he returned to Poland in 1930, where their son Jan was born. They lived near Poznań in Rudki Palace which was owned by his wife's family and in which they hosted, for months on end, fellow artists and officers from his regiment. In 1935 the family moved to Grebanin, a village near the town of Kępno in which he initiated a regional museum and commenced a large fresco in the town hall. In 1936 Anusia, his daughter was born. He exhibited frequently in Poland and in 1937 was awarded a silver medal at the International Exhibition of Art and Technology in Paris.

He fought in the 1939 campaign and when that collapsed attempted to reach allied forces in Narvik. When the fall of France made this impossible he settled in Sweden where he continued to paint and sculpt, and organised an exhibition of Polish-Norwegian Art. In 1941 his family joined him but in September 1943 he was ordered to join the Polish Army in Britain. On arriving in Scotland in a Mosquito, he was told that he was too old for front-line duty and was stationed in London. There he engaged with enthusiasm in the Polish cultural life, was appointed President of the Association of Polish Artists and joined the exclusive London Group.

A number of exhibitions in London led to a position in the Bath Academy of Art, Corsham, where he significantly influenced the creative thinking of a new wave of British painters such as Peter Lanyon, William Scott, and Patrick Heron. Every two years he exhibited in the Gimpel Fils Gallery.

In 1958 he was invited to work in Poland. There followed four very intensive years where he not only produced his most powerful paintings but also sculptures and scenography projects. He had his first exhibition at the National Museum in Poznań, 1958, then in National Museums of Kraków, Gdańsk, Warsaw, Wrocław and Szczecin. The very good reception of his work contributed to his decision to stay in the country. He exhibited in the Venice Biennale in 1960 receiving a silver medal and also in the Galerie Lacloche, Paris.

He died on 24 April 1962, in Warsaw and was buried in the Powązki Cemetery in the Avenue of Merit.

== Influence ==
Kenneth Armitage, fellow tutor at Corsham, said: "... while we were all individuals before his arrival we must have seemed, thereafter, rather ordinary compared to Piotr's personal approach to everything. He came from an outside world, from a longer time-life span; he brought a foreign flavour and his values and approach were different. Once or twice in a lifetime at just the right moment — somebody else can move into one's own small private world endowed with mysterious authority to push and pull in directions that, without such encouragement, one might only slowly (or even never) take necessary and positive action. Such a one was Peter ... We became close friends".

Adrian Heath, fellow tutor at Corsham said: "To this community (of artists at Corsham) he brought a catholic taste and breadth of understanding that can truly be described as cosmopolitan; a quality that was hungrily accepted by men who had been insulated from continental opinions by seven years of war".

== Key exhibitions ==
- 1927: Salon des Indépendants, Grand Palais, Paris
- 1937: International Exhibition, Polish Pavilion, Paris
- 1947–1957: annual, Gimpel Fils Gallery, London
- 1958 National Museum, Poznań
- 1962 Galerie Lacloche, Paris
- 1996 National Gallery of Contemporary Art, Warsaw
- 2013 Galeria Studio, Palace of Culture, Warsaw

== Works in state museums and galleries ==
- Tate St Ives
- Royal West of England Academy
- Bristol City Museum and Art Gallery
- National Museum of Warsaw
- National Museum of Poznań
- National Museum of Kraków
- National Museum of Katowice
- National Museum of Gdańsk

== See also ==
- Polish visual artists
