= Polish Arts Club of Chicago =

American nonprofit organization

The Polish Arts Club of Chicago is a 501(c)(3) not-for-profit established in 1926. The club's first art exhibition was held in 1933.

== Advocacy and outreach ==
The club's advocacy and outreach work has included collaborating with several other arts and culture organizations in both the United States and Poland.

The Polish Arts Club of Chicago is the oldest affiliated organization of the American Council for Polish Culture, which was founded in 1948 in Detroit as the American Council of Polish Cultural Clubs. It currently represents the interests of some thirty-five to forty affiliated organizations located in the United States.
