= Zygmunt Waliszewski =

Polish painter (1897–1936)

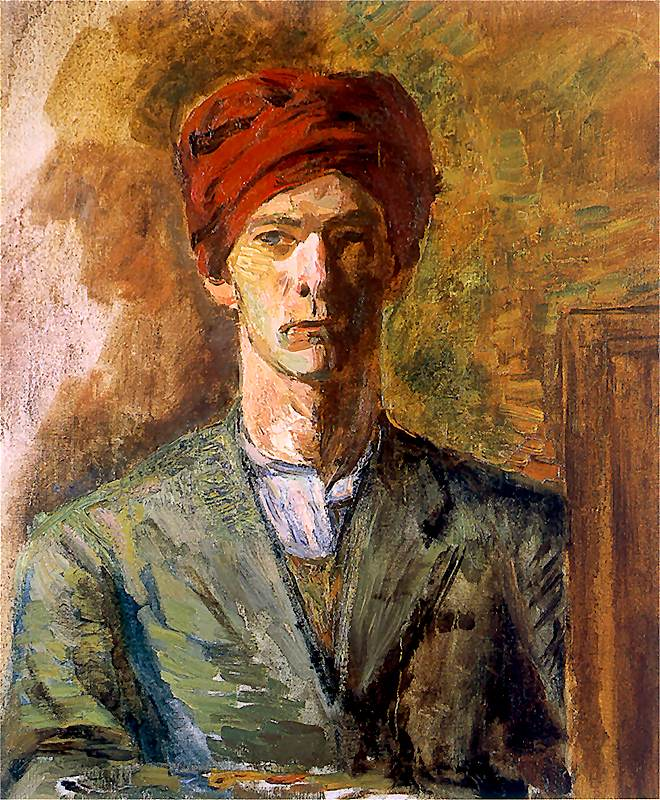
Self-portrait in a Red Turban (1929)

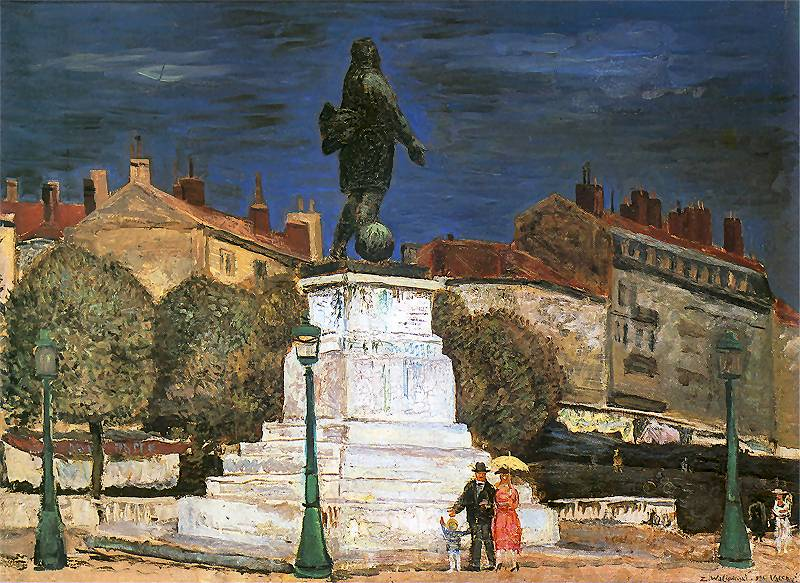
Statue of General Championnet (1926)

Zygmunt Waliszewski (1897–1936) was a Polish painter, a member of the Kapist movement.

== Biography ==
Waliszewski was born in Saint Petersburg to the Polish family of an engineer. In 1907 his parents moved to Tbilisi where Waliszewski spent his childhood. In Tbilisi began his studies at a prestigious art school. In 1908 he had his first exhibition and participated in the life of artistic avant-garde. During World War I he fought with the Russian army, returning to Tbilisi in 1917. He visited Moscow several times and became inspired by the Russian Futurists. He, later, became a member of a prolific Futurist group in Tbilisi. In the early 1920s, he departed for Poland, and settled in Kraków. Between 1921 and 1924 he studied at Academy of Fine Arts in Kraków in the studios of Wojciech Weiss and Józef Pankiewicz. In 1924 he went to Paris with his avant-garde group and continued his studies in painting there under the guidance of Pankiewicz. He was a participant in the Capists' plein-air painting workshops in Cagnes, Valence, Cap Martin, and Avignon. At the Louvre, he painted copies and travesties of the works of old masters like Titian, Veronese, Velázquez, Vermeer, Goya, and Delacroix. He was also fascinated by the art of Cézanne, van Gogh, and Matisse.

In 1931 he returned to Poland, residing in Warsaw, Krzeszowice, and Kraków. During this time Waliszewski designed scenery and posters, created book illustrations, drew and painted caricatures and grotesque scenes. In Kraków he befriended the Polish Formists. Waliszewski painted primarily portraits and figural compositions and landscapes of the rural countryside. He died suddenly in 1936.

== Bibliography ==
- Maciej Masłowski: Zygmunt Waliszewski, Warsaw 1962, ed. "Arkady";
- Free Use Biography

'
