= Jan Cybis =

Polish painter and art teacher

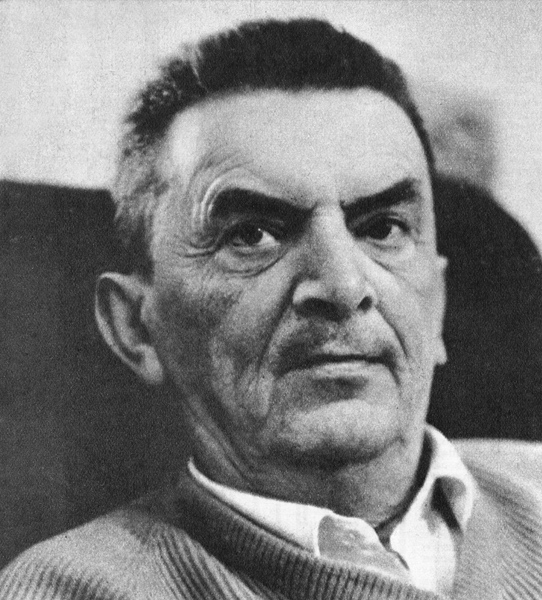
Jan Cybis in 1965

Jan Cybis (16 February 1897 – 13 December 1972) was a Polish painter and art teacher.

== Biography ==
Cybis was born in Fröbel (later Wróblin, Opole Voivodeship, Poland) and studied at the Jan Matejko Academy of Fine Arts in Kraków, where he had moved in 1934. The German Expressionist Otto Mueller was his mentor. He studied under Józef Pankiewicz among others, developing a reputation for a post-impressionist style using rich, saturated color influenced by the French.

In the 1930s Cybis was among the most prominent of the Kapists or Paris Committee, a significant group of Polish painters of the time. His wife Hanna Rudzka-Cybisowa (1897–1988) was also a Kapist painter.

Cybis was awarded the Polish communist government's Order of the Banner of Work in 1949 and the Medal of the 10th Anniversary of People's Poland in 1955, during the Socialist Realism period when Cybis was prevented from teaching for ideological reasons. Among his students was Tadeusz Dominik.

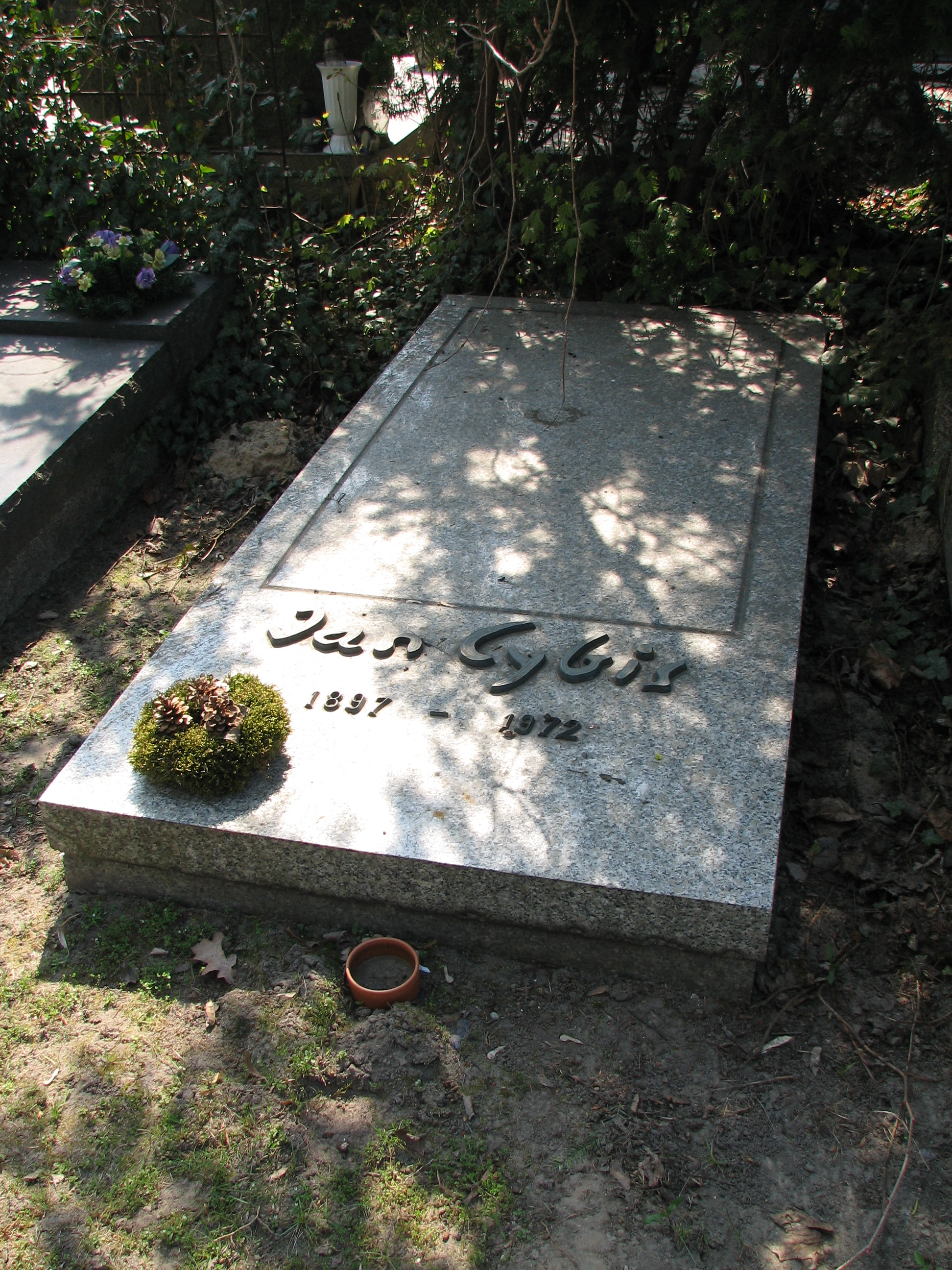
Cybis's gravesite, Powązki Military Cemetery, Warsaw

Cybis was buried at the Powązki Military Cemetery in Warsaw. His memoirs were published in 1980.

== Jan Cybis Award ==
Since 1973 the Association of Polish Artists and Designers (Polish acronym ZPAP) has issued an annual Jan Cybis Award to Polish visual artists for creative achievement.
