= Józef Pankiewicz =

Polish painter

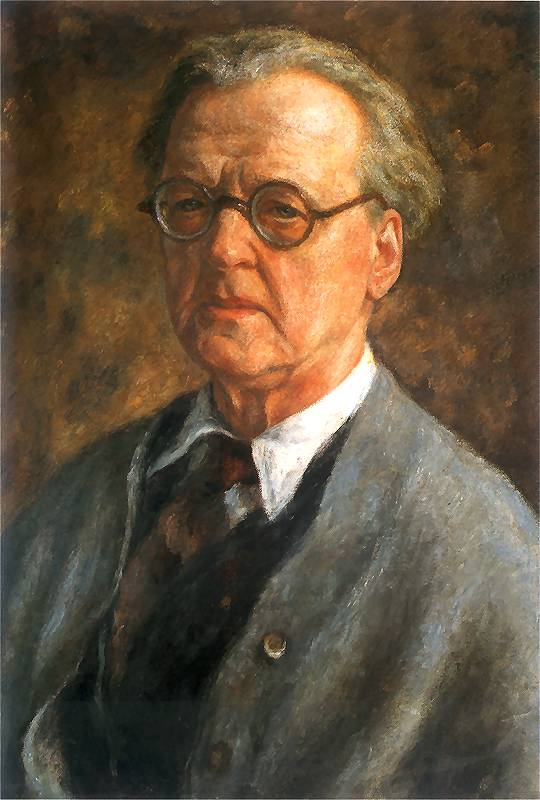
- Self-portrait (1900s)
- Born: 29 November 1866; Lublin
- Died: 4 July 1940 (aged 73); La Ciotat, France

Signature
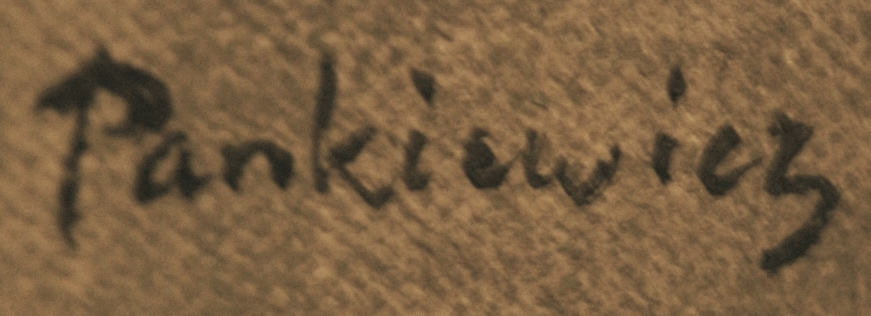

Józef Pankiewicz (29 November 1866 – 4 July 1940) was a Polish impressionist painter, graphic artist and teacher. He spent much of his career in France.

== Biography ==
Pankiewicz was born on 29 November 1866 in Lublin. From 1884 to 1885, he studied at the School of Fine Arts in Warsaw under Wojciech Gerson and Aleksander Kamiński. After obtaining a scholarship, he went to Saint Petersburg to study at the Imperial Academy of Arts. In 1889, he and his studio partner Władysław Podkowiński went to Paris to participate in the Exposition Universelle and he was awarded a silver medal for his painting of a vegetable market.

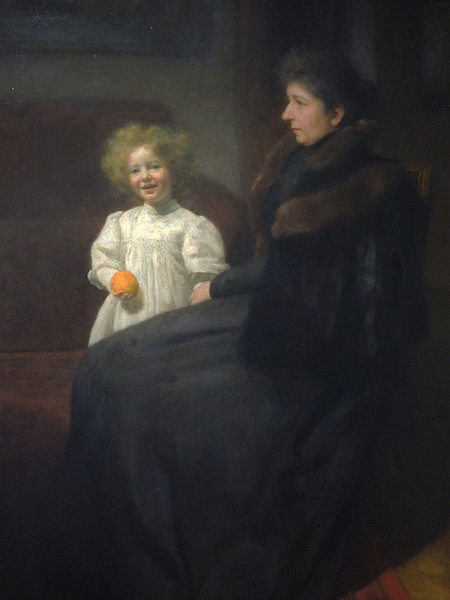
Mrs. Oderfeld and her Daughter, National Museum in Warsaw

While there, he was influenced by the impressionists and, when he returned to Poland in 1890, attempted to introduce the latest French trends there. The reaction from critics was largely hostile; one going so far as to advise him to see an optometrist. He persisted, however, and later produced a series of portraits inspired by the work of James McNeill Whistler. His portrait, "Mrs. Oderfeld and her Daughter", won a gold medal at the Exposition Universelle (1900). He was also a frequent exhibitor at the Salon.

In 1897, he became one of the founding members of the Society of Polish Artists "Sztuka". For the next nine years, he travelled continuously throughout Western Europe, until he was appointed a Professor at the Kraków Academy of Fine Arts in 1906. He continued to travel in France, especially along the Mediterranean coast, producing a large series of landscapes and city views which increasingly showed the influence of Paul Cézanne.

During the First World War, he lived in Spain, where he met Robert Delaunay and once again absorbed new post-impressionist influences into his style; notably fauvism. He became the leader of a group of young artists known as the Kapists (Colourists), whose members were opposed to the Romantic tradition in Polish art. In 1923, he returned to the Academy in Kraków. After 1925, he was the Director of its branch in Paris. Among his notable students were Józef Czapski, Alice Halicka, Moïse Kisling, Jan Rubczak, Zygmunt Waliszewski and Wacław Zawadowski.

Between the wars, his style evolved again, becoming more decorative, and he painted a series of still-lifes. He also continued to paint landscapes in Southern France. In 1927, he was named a member of the Legion of Honor. In 1933, he was awarded the Order of Polonia Restituta. A major showing of his works was held at the National Museum to celebrate his seventieth birthday in 1936. The following year, he retired and went to live in La Ciotat, where he died on 4 July 1940.

== Selected paintings ==
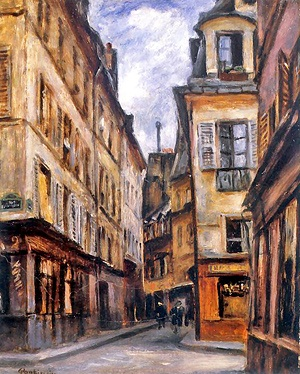
Rue Cardinale, Paris

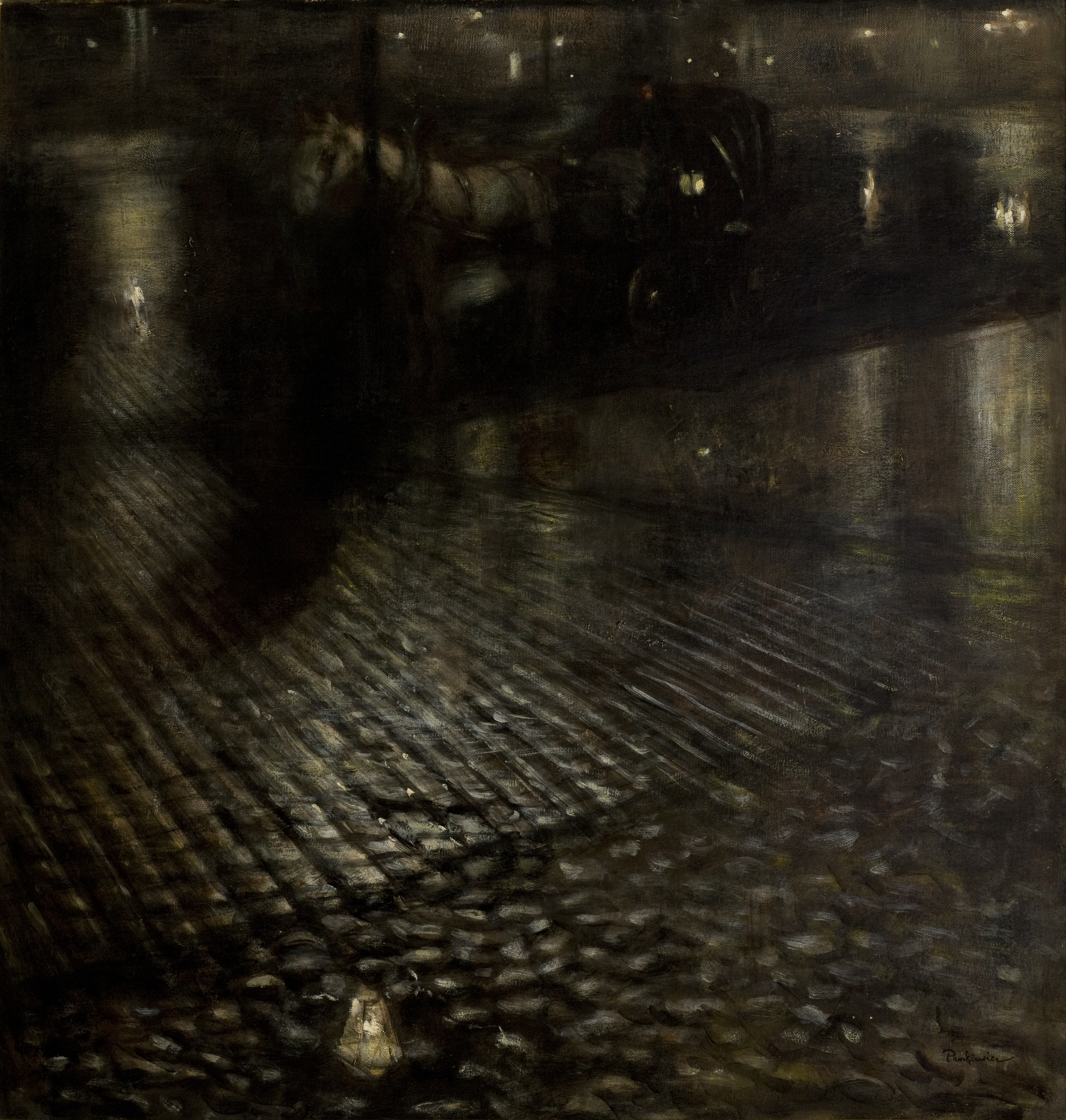
Cab at Night

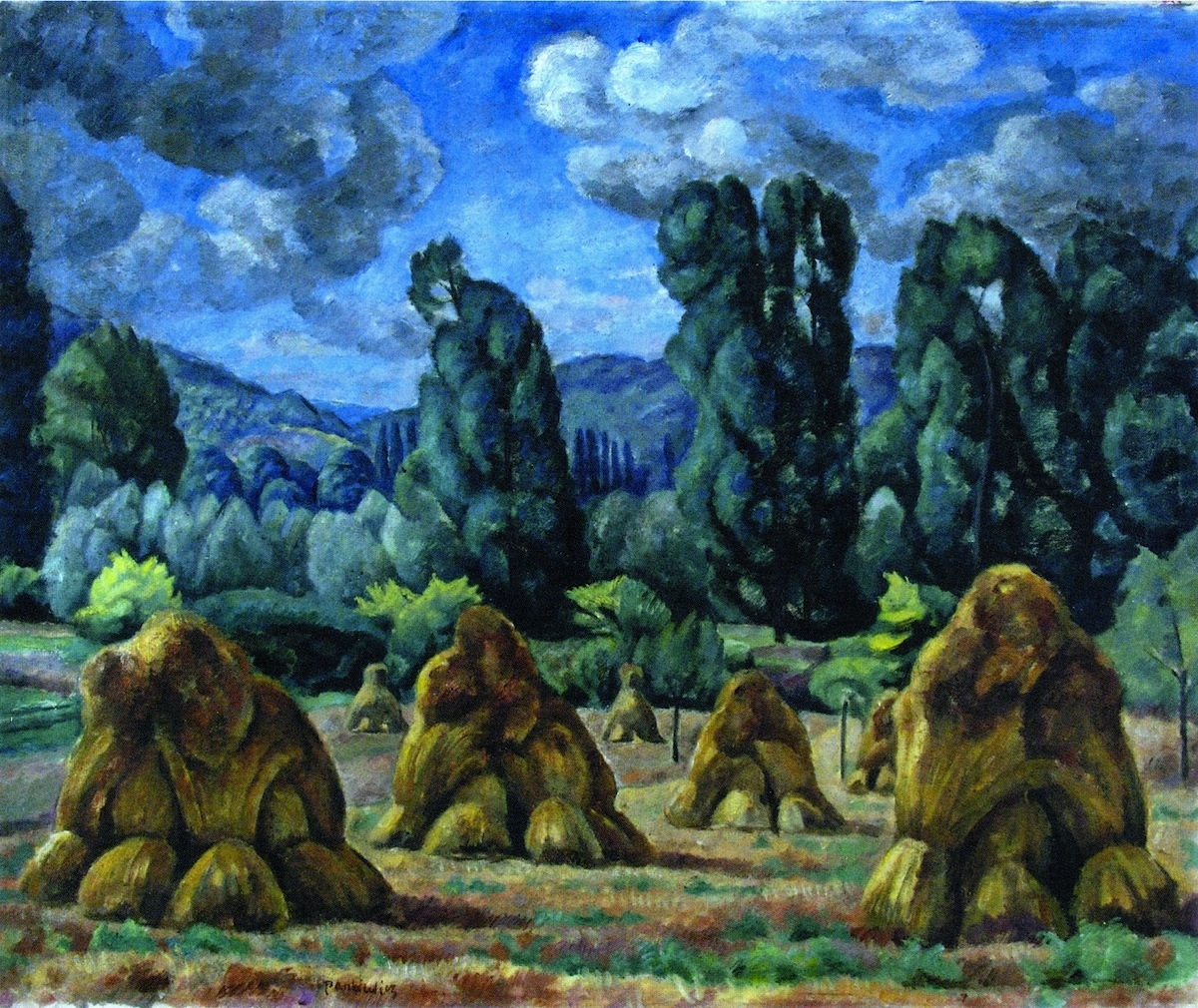
Haystacks, National Museum in Kielce

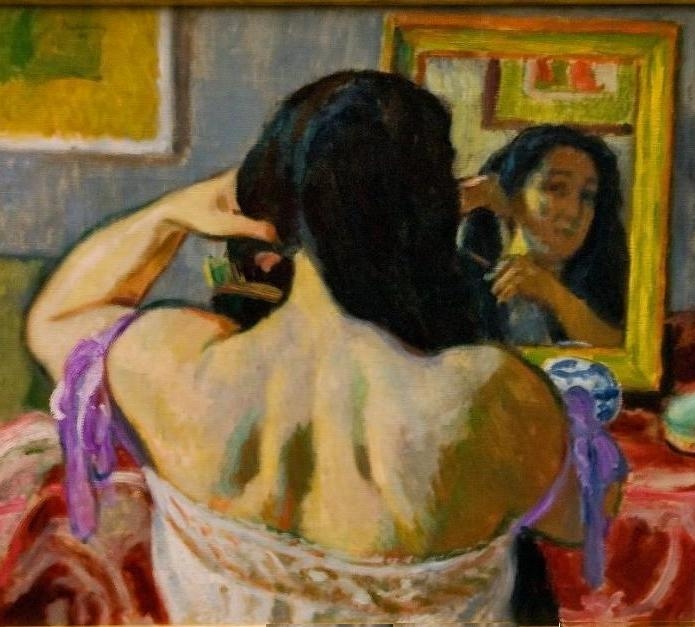
Woman Brushing her Hair

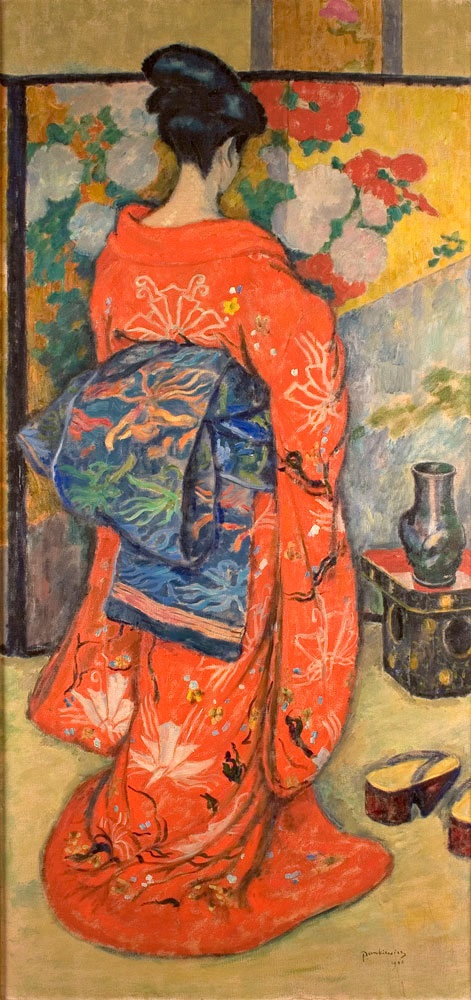
Japanese
