= Kapists =

Polish art movement in 1920s and 1930s

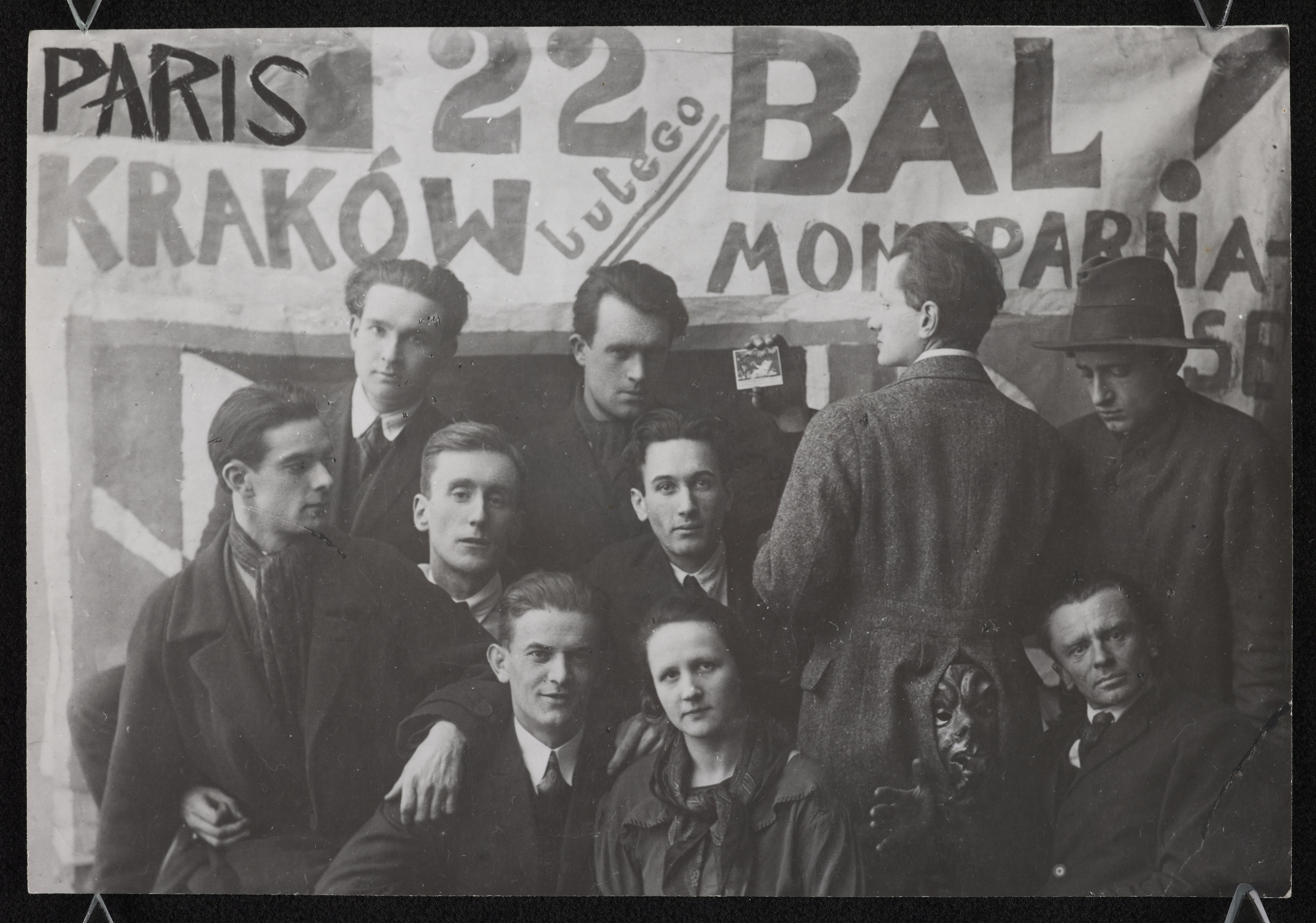
- A group photo of the Kapists including Hanna Rudzka-Cybisowa, Jan Cybis, Józef Czapski, Tytus Czyżewski, Zygmunt Waliszewski, and Piotr Potworowski, 1925
- Years active: 1920s-1930s
- Location: Paris, French Third Republic
- Major figures: Józef Pankiewicz
- Influences: Post-Impressionism
- Influenced: Formizm; Futurism; Naïve art

Kapists or KPists (Polish: Kapiści, from KP, the Polish acronym for the Paris Committee), also known as the Colourists, were a group of Polish painters of the 1930s who dominated the Polish artistic landscape of the epoch. Contrary to Polish romanticist traditions, the Kapists underlined the independence of art from any historical tradition, symbolism or influences of literature and history. They were formed around Józef Pankiewicz and were under the strong influence of the French Post-Impressionists.

The name of the movement was derived from the full name of the so-called Paris Committee, or Paris Committee of Relief for Students Leaving for Artistic Studies in France (Polish: Komitet Paryskiej Pomocy dla Wyjeżdżających Studentów na Studia Malarskie do Francji). Apart from Pankiewicz, among the best-known Kapists were Jan Cybis, Józef Czapski, Józef Jarema, Artur Nacht-Samborski, Eugeniusz Geppert, Piotr Potworowski, Hanna Rudzka and Zygmunt Waliszewski.

In 1930, the Kapists held an exhibition at the Galerie Zak in Paris and in 1931 another exhibit at the Galerie Moos in Geneva.
