= Alicja Wahl =

Polish artist (1932–2022)

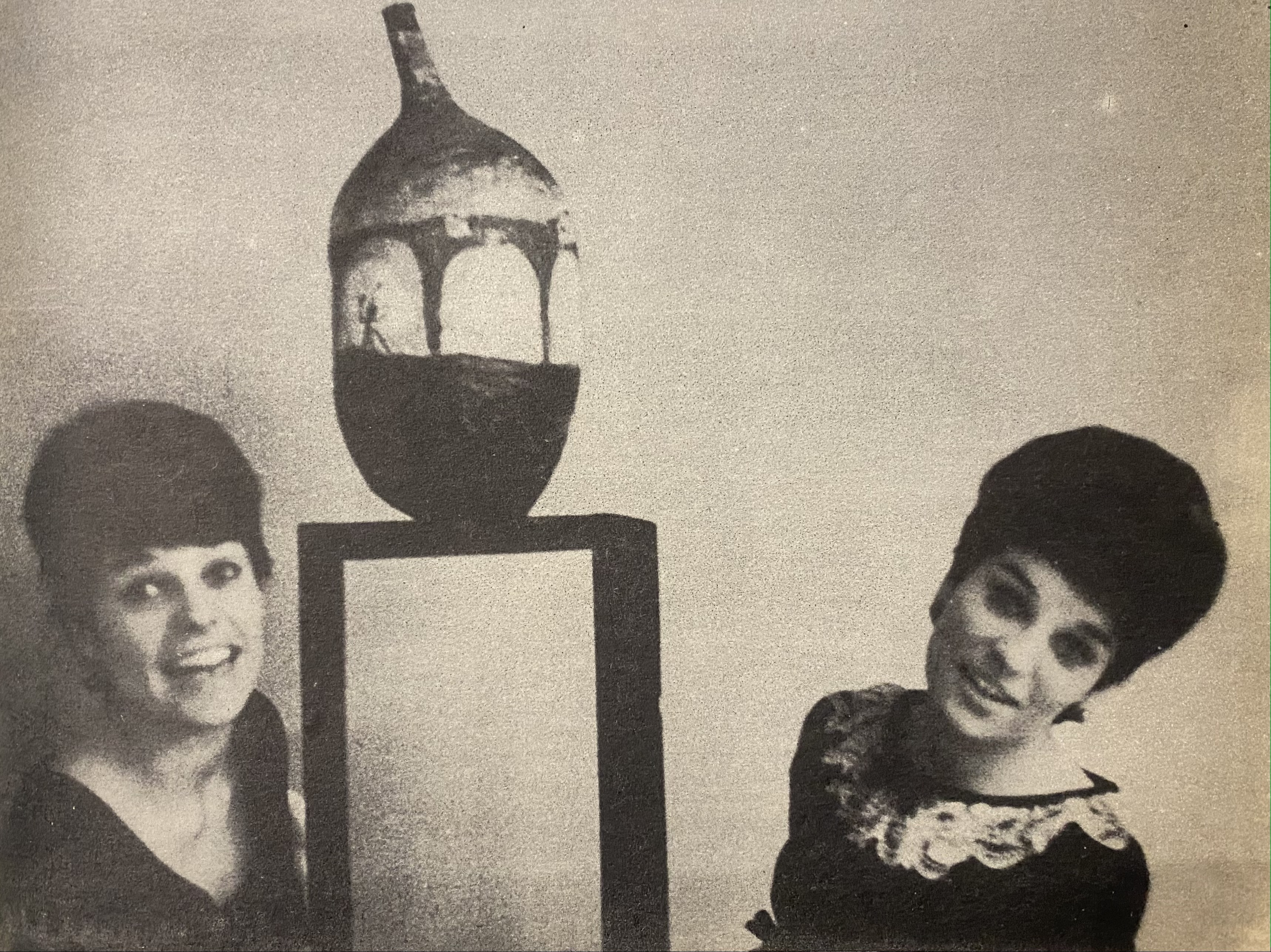
- Wahl sisters at the Krzywe Koło gallery in 1961 during their ceramics exhibition.
- Born: 12 October 1932; Warsaw, Poland
- Died: 19 October 2020 (aged 88); Konstancin-Jeziorna, Poland
- Education: Academy of Fine Arts in Warsaw
- Known for: Painting, drawing, illustration, scenography

Alicja Wahl (12 October 1932 – 19 October 2020) was a Polish artist. She is known for her contribution to the cultural life of Warsaw in the 1980s and 1990s.

== Biography ==
Wahl was born on 12 October 1932 in Warsaw. She studied at the Academy of Fine Arts in Warsaw from 1952 to 1957, majoring in Painting under the guidance of Prof. Eugeniusz Eibisch. In 1958, she completed an annex to her diploma in the Ceramics Department at the Academy of Fine Arts, under the supervision of Prof. Wanda Golakowska. She pursued her studies at the Warsaw Academy of Fine Arts simultaneously with her twin sister, Bożena Wahl. Starting from 1961, the two artists began exhibiting together. Their first exhibition at the Krzywe Koło Gallery featured ceramics, and subsequent exhibitions showcased drawings and paintings.

In 1979, Alicja Wahl opened her own art gallery in her home in Warsaw's Żoliborz district, initially running it in collaboration with her sister, Bożena Wahl. This gallery was one of the first private art institutions of its kind in Poland. The Gallery A.B. Wahl specialized in presenting artists who embraced a wide range of surrealistic styles and poetics, as well as expressive and metaphorical figuration, reflecting the artistic interests of the gallery's founder. Alicja Wahl's ambition was to gather around her gallery the most outstanding Polish painters, sculptors, and graphic artists. The gallery exhibited artists such as Jan Lebenstein, Jan Tarasin, Teresa Pągowska, Henryk Tomaszewski, Franciszek Starowieyski, Tadeusz Brzozowski, Zdzisław Beksiński, Tadeusz Dominik, Jacek Sienicki, Jacek Waltoś, Adam Hoffmann, Andrzej Dudziński, Waldemar Świerzy, and others. The gallery also hosted retrospective exhibitions of artists like Witkacy and Bruno Schulz, as well as Alfred Lenica. For many years, Galeria A. B. Wahl served as an important meeting place, where writers, theater and film artists, and diplomats frequented.

In her personal life, she was married to the writer Roman Bratny from 1954 to 1968, with whom she had a daughter, Julia. Her granddaughter is Natalia Luniak, a toy designer, founder of Kalimba and president of the Alicja and Bożena Wahl Foundation.

== Work ==
The Wahl sisters gained fame in the 1960s with their impressive drawings inspired by literary works from authors such as Homer, Miguel de Cervantes, Marcel Proust, Franz Kafka, Giuseppe Tomasi di Lampedusa, and more. These drawings presented their unique interpretations of symbols found in literature and were exhibited in galleries in Paris, New York, Stockholm, and Berlin. Critics noted their distinctive style, untouched by external influences and free from mannerisms.

"These drawings carried an element of surprise and astonishment, giving them an independent life apart from the texts that inspired them. Alicja Wahl drew Homer like a flowing river, shimmering like silver, solemn and profound. She portrayed Kafka as one would depict dreams: tinted with poisonous green and a persistent violet throughout [...]"

— Mieczysław Porębski, „A Farewell to Criticism"

In the 60s and 70s, Alicja Wahl collaborated with various publications and publishers as an illustrator among others:Kultura (1963–1981), Ty i Ja and Szpilki. She designed book covers for works by authors such as Oscar Wilde, Carl Zuckmayer, August Strindberg, Roman Bratny, and Leopold Buczkowski. She also created the famous illustrations for the first edition of Witkacy's 622 Falls of Bungo, or The Demonic Woman, which caused such outrage by the censors that the entire print run was withdrawn to remove a "too erotic" illustration from the title page.

Alicja and her sister Bożena Wahl also contributed to the set design for Television Theater (e.g., "Oczy są ogniem, czoło jest zwierciadłem" directed by Olga Lipińska in 1966, "Zemsta sieroty" directed by Jerzy Gruza in 1968, "Kurka wodna" directed by Tadeusz Minc in 1971, "Krzesło w szczerym polu" directed by Janusz Majewski in 1970, "Misterium niedzielne" directed by Krystyna Sznerr in 1971) and for cabarets such as "Wieczór ze Szpakiem" in 1966, "Divertimento c-moll" in 1966, and the Kabaret Starszych Panów, episode XVI "Zaopiekujcie się Leonem."

Alicja Wahl's works can be found in public collections such as the National Museum in Warsaw, the National Museum in Kielce, the National Museum in Szczecin, the Zachęta - National Gallery, and the Museum of Literature in Warsaw. Additionally, her art is part of private collections, including FAMM (Femmes Artistes du Musée de Mougins) and Grażyna Kulczyk's collection.

== Style ==
Initially, the artistic works of both sisters represented a similar style and dealt with related realms of experiences, such as feelings of solitude, the drama of existence, the mysterious forces of nature, sisterhood, and sexuality. It was only in the 1970s that their styles became more distinct, with Alicja introducing color and brightening her palette, while still emphasizing figuration and feminine sexuality. In the 1970s, working in the isolated context of communist Poland, without access to second-wave feminist theoretical writings, she addressed this topic in a unique and intuitive way. Her erotic imagery was filled with tension, humor, and surreal creatures that combined human and non-human attributes. Her work from this period can be described as bodily surrealism.

Starting in the 1980s, Alicja Wahl began to focus on painting, which eventually dominated her artistic practice. She replaced her precise lines with broad strokes of paint, with light becoming a central element in modeling figures and creating the atmosphere of her canvases. Her expressive works from this period echoed influences from luminism, the styles of Caravaggio, and the techniques of William Turner. The predominant theme in her paintings during this period was the portrayal of the female figure.

== Solo exhibitions or joint exhibitions with her sister ==
- 2021 "Sisters Alicja i Bożena Wahl" Gallery lokal_30, Warsaw, Poland
- 2021 "Sisters Alicja i Bożena Wahl" Arton Foundation, Warsaw, Poland
- 1997 Gallery A.B. Wahl, Warsaw, Poland
- 1993 La Galerie Agnieszka Bielińska, Brussels, Belgium
- 1993 Gallery A.B.Wahl, Warsaw, Poland
- 1992 Gallery A.B. Wahl, Warsaw, Poland
- 1985 Gallery A.B. Wahl, Warsaw, Poland
- 1983 Gallery BWA Baszta Czarownic, Słupsk, Poland
- 1983 Gallery BWA, Gorzów Wielkopolski, Poland
- 1983 Gallery BWA, Konin, Poland
- 1982 Gallery BWA, Tarnów, Poland
- 1981 Gallery u Kalimacha, Toruń, Poland
- 1981 Gallery A.B. Wahl, Warsaw, Poland
- 1980 Kurt Schumacher, Bonn, Germany
- 1980 Gallery BWA, Łódź, Poland
- 1980 Polski Instytut Kultury, Paris, France
- 1979 Gallery A.B. Wahl, Warsaw, Poland
- 1976 Gallery Art, Warsaw, Poland
- 1975 Galerie Hinskes – Kocea, Xanten, Germany
- 1975 Galerie L Elisabeth Henning, Hamburg, Germany
- 1974 Galerie Warschau, Berlin, Germany
- 1974 Gallery Zapiecek, Warsaw, Poland
- 1973 Galerie L Elisabeth Henning, Hamburg, Germany
- 1971 Gallery Latina, Stockholm, Sweden
- 1969 Gallery Mazowiecka, Warsaw, Poland
- 1967 Galeria Le Ranelagh, Paris, France
- 1966 Galeria Sztuki Nowoczesnej (dawne Krzywe Koło), Warsaw, Poland
- 1962 Galeria Krzywe Koło, Warsaw, Poland
- 1961 Galeria Krzywe Koło, Warsaw, Poland

== Group exhibitions ==
- 2024 "Chcemy całego życia. Feminizmy w sztuce polskiej" Państwowa Galeria Sztuki, Sopot
- 2023 "Tender Debauchery" Gallery lokal_30, Warsaw, Poland - among others: Natalia LL, Dorota Nieznalska, Zuzanna Janin, Jan Możdżyński, Anna Orbaczewska, Joanna Rajkowska, Teresa Tyszkiewicz
- 2023 "I saw the other side of the sun with you: Female Surrealists from Eastern Europe" Cromwell Place, London, UK - among others: Alina Szapocznikow, Erna Rosenstein, Maria Anto, Franciszka Themerson
- 2023 "Old veins, new tunnels" Gallery Heidi, Berlin, Germany - among others: Alina Szapocznikow, Leidy Churchman, Royce Weatherly
- 1987 Galeria A.B. Wahl, Warsaw, Poland - among others: Jerzy Tchórzewski, Teresa Pągowska, Barbara Jonscher, Zdzisław Beksiński, Franciszek Starowieyski, Jerzy Stajuda
- 1987 Gallery A.B. Wahl, Warsaw, Poland
- 1981 "Tadeusz Brzozowski – Friends and Students" Gallery BWA Arsenał, Poznań, Poland – among others: Jan Dobkowski, Kazimierz Mikulski, Jerzy Stajuda, Jerzy Tchórzewski, Jacek Waltoś, Ryszard Winiarski
- 1980 Gallery Radar, Warsaw, Poland
- 1975 The Bronx Museum of the arts, New York, USA
- 1974 Galerie Kubus, Munich, Germany
- 1974 Gallery Latina, Stockholm, Sweden
- 1974 "Erotic Art" Ventura, California, USA - among others: Jan Dobkowski, Jan Lebenstein, Stefan Żechowski
- 1972 Wert-Galerie, Vienna, Austria - among others: Maria Anto, Jerzy Tchórzewski, Jacek Gaj, Leszek Rózga, Jerzy Stajuda, Jan Tarasin
- 1968 Galerie Desbriere, Paris, France

== Gallery ==
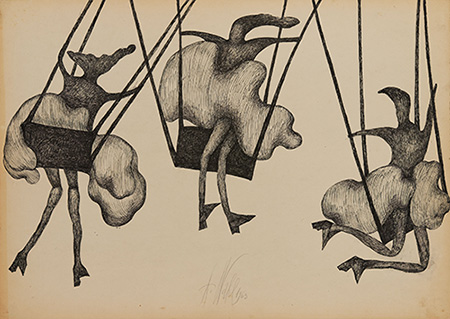
Alicja Wahl, 1963, ink on paper, 50 x 70 cm

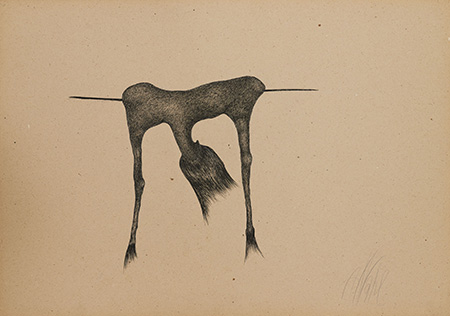
Alicja Wahl, 60s., ink on paper, 70 x 100 cm

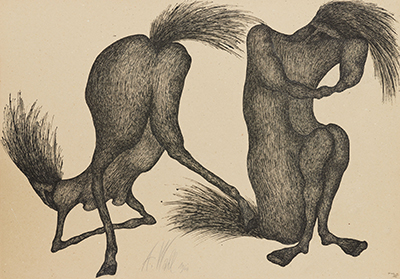
Alicja Wahl, 1966, ink on paper, 70 x 100 cm

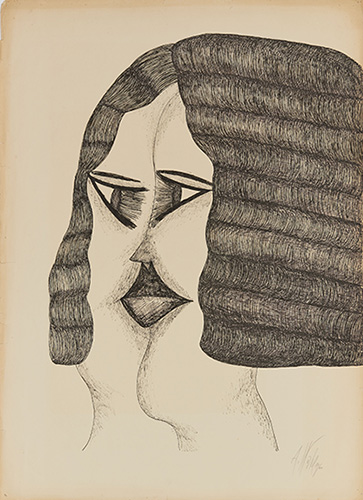
Alicja Wahl, 1960, ink on paper, 70 x 50 cm

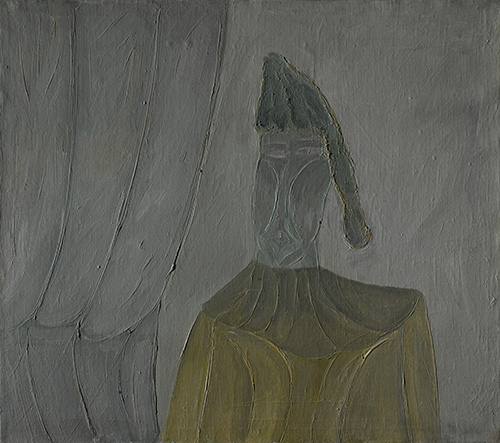
Alicja Wahl, 60s., oil on canvas, 79 x 90 cm

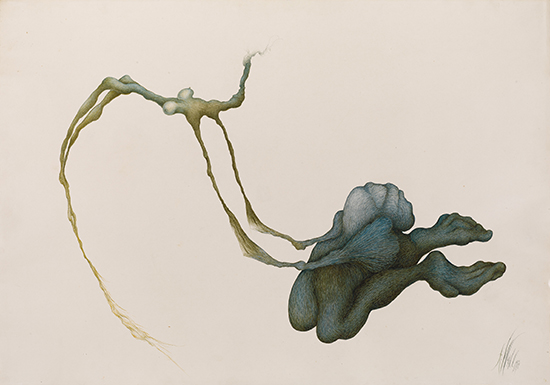
Alicja Wahl, 1974, ink on paper, 70 x 100 cm

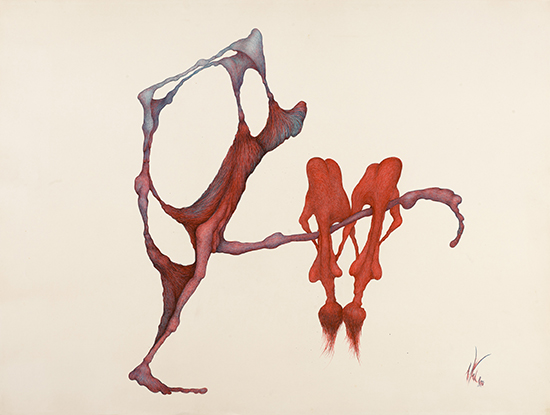
Alicja Wahl, “Twins” self-portrait series, 1973, ink on paper, 75 x 100 cm

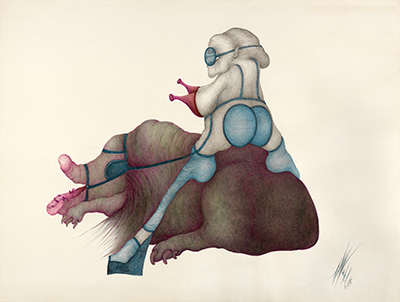
Alicja Wahl, 1973, ink on paper, 75 x 100 cm From Grażyna Kulczyk's collection.

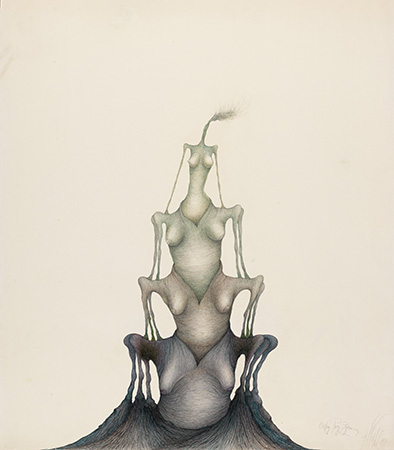
Alicja Wahl, "four seasons of life",1974, ink on paper, 80 x 70 cm From Grażyna Kulczyk's collection.

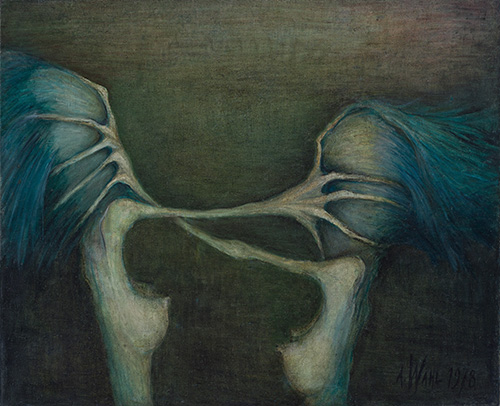
Alicja Wahl, 1978, oil on canvas, 88 x 108 cm

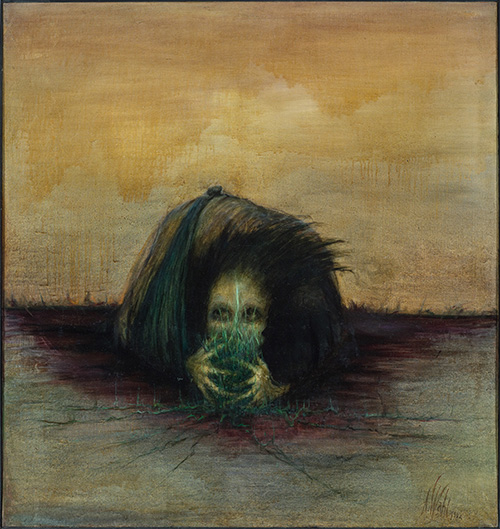
Alicja Wahl, “Upwards”, 1978, oil on canvas, 130 x 125 cm

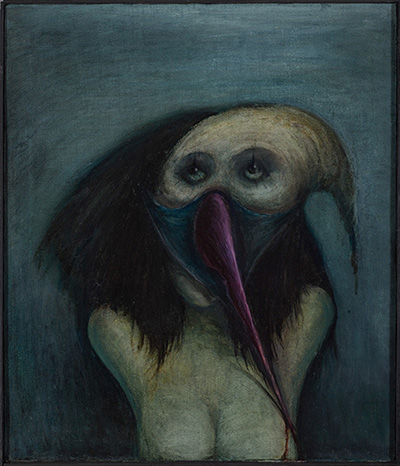
Alicja Wahl, 1978, oil on canvas, 76 x 66 cm

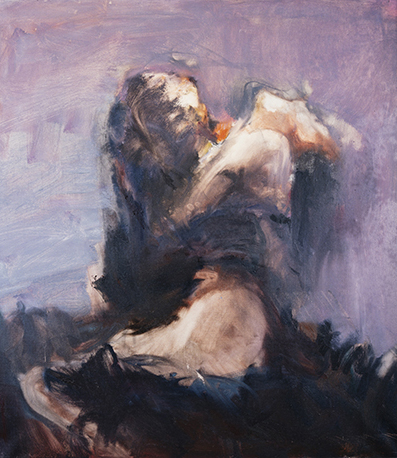
Alicja Wahl, “Us!”, 1990, oil on canvas, 110 x 100 cm

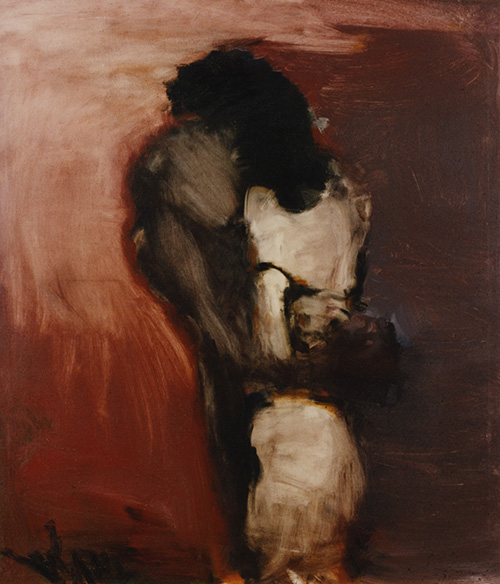
Alicja Wahl, 1992, oil on canvas,100 x 89 cm

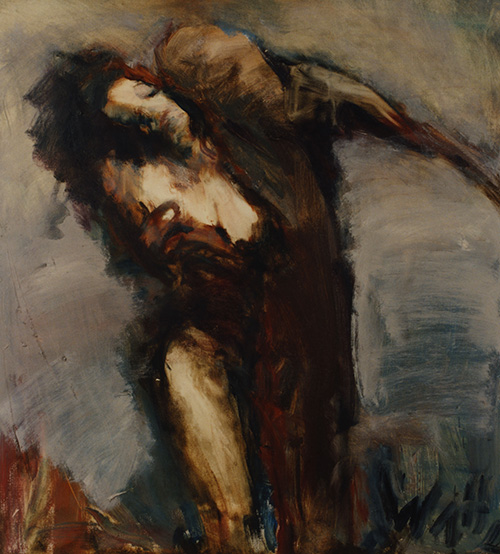
Alicja Wahl, 1992, oil on canvas, 110 x 100 cm

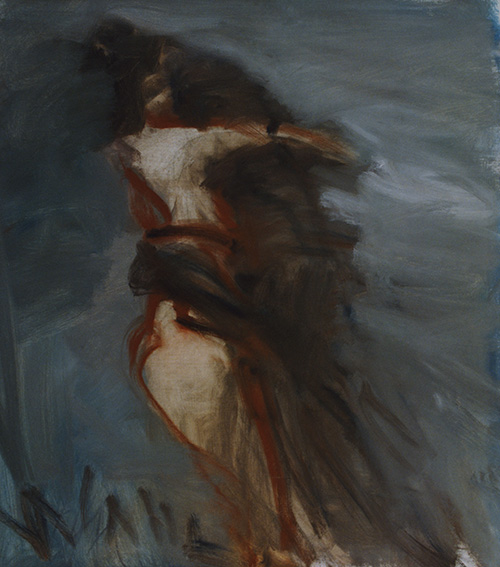
Alicja Wahl, 1992, oil on canvas, 97 x 110 cm

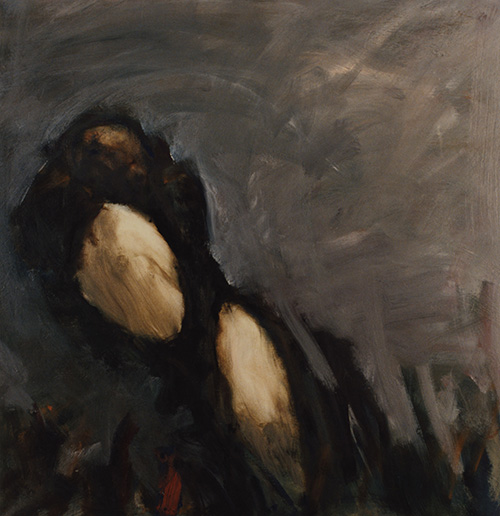
Alicja Wahl, 1989, oil on canvas, 97 x 110 cm

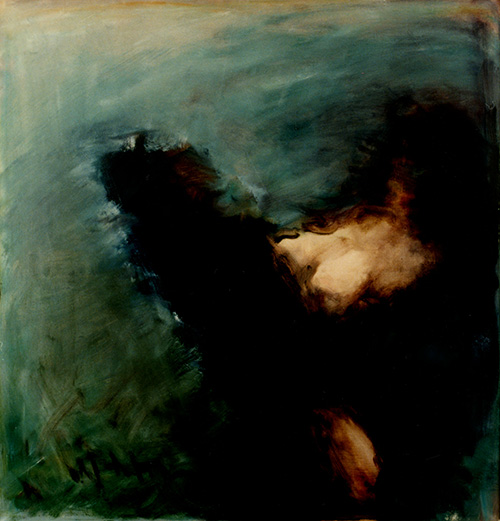
Alicja Wahl, 1989, oil on canvas, 97 x 110 cm

== Bibliography ==
- Anke Kempkes, I saw the other side of the sun with you Female Surrealists from Eastern Europe, katalog do wystawy, Londyn 2023, pp. 46–49.
- Agnieszka Rayzacher, „Siostry" Alicji i Bożeny Wahl w lokal_30, Warsaw 2022
- Przemysław Pawlak, Półwiecze Bunga i Siostry, wystawa prac Alicji i Bożeny Wahl, „Witkacy" czyste dusze w niemytej formie, Warsaw 2022, pp. 130–139.
- Agnieszka Rayzacher, Artist feature: Alicja and Bożena Wahl, Blok, 2022
- Piotr Policht, Siostry: Alicja i Bożena Wahl, „Szum" nr 35, Warsaw 2021, p. 188–193.
- Xymena Zaniewska, Xymena, Warsaw, 2015, p. 59, 195.
- Elżbieta Dzikowska, Polacy w Sztuce Świata, Warsaw 2001, p. 278–281.
- Słownik Malarzy Polskich, t. 2, Warsaw 2001.
- Janusz Jaremowicz, W kręgu uczucia, „Literatura" 9/1997, p. 65.
- Zbigniew Taranienko, Światło kobiet, „Nowa Europa" 18 VI, 1992.
- Monika Małkowska, Prawdziwa Alicja Wahl, „Życie Warszawy" 22 VI, 1992.
- Kazimierz Henczel, Przenikanie osobowości, „Magazyn Kulturalny" nr 2, 1980.
- Henryk Waniek, Nastrój i Rygor, „Twórczość" nr 8, 1979.
- Magdalena Hniedziewicz, Salon artystyczny sióstr Wahl, „Kultura" 17 IV, 1979.
- Maciej Karpiński, Dom na kaniowskiej, „Radar", 1974.
- Maciej Gutowski, Sztuka nie tylko erotyczna, „Kultura" 27 X, 1974, p. 11.
- Evelyn Preuss, Grotesken ohne Bitterkeit, „Hamburger Abendblatt" 13 XI, 1973, p. 7.
- Evelyn Preuss, Galerie L, „Hamburg kulturell" nr XI, 1973, p. 20.
- Mauritz Edstrom, Polska paret Wahl – omojliga att skilja at, „Dagens Nyheter", 6 XII, 1971.
- Jerzy Olkiewicz, Drapieżna wystawa, „Kultura" 26 X, 1969, p. 10.
- Mieczysław Porębski, Pożegnanie z krytyką, Kraków 1966 (II wyd. 1983), pp. 326–329.
- Jerzy Olkiewicz, Alicja i Bożena Wahl, „Kultura" 26 VI, 1962, p. 10.
- Stanisław Ledóchowski, Zmierzch Manifestów, „Nowa Kultura" nr 44, 1962, p. 9.
- Zygmunt Kałużyński, Rehabilitacja Zwykłości, „Nowa Kultura", 1962.
- Jerzy Stajuda, „Nowa Kultura", 1961.
