= Mierzejewski =

Mierzejewski (feminine Mierzejewska) is a Polish surname. Notable people include:

- Adrian Mierzejewski, Polish footballer
- Agnieszka Mierzejewska, Polish athlete
- Aleksandra Mierzejewska, Polish weightlifter
- Andrzej Mierzejewski, Polish cyclist
- Halina Mierzejewska, Polish linguist
- Hanna Mierzejewska, Polish politician
- Jacek Mierzejewski, Polish artist
- Jerzy Mierzejewski, Polish artist & pedagogue at Łódź Film School
- Łukasz Mierzejewski, Polish footballer
