= Missionary Church and Monastery, Lublin =

Church in Lublin, Poland

Coordinates: 51°14′42.28″N 22°34′8.52″E

Post-missionary church and monastery in Lublin - the church of the Transfiguration of Our Lord in Lublin was erected in the years 1717–1730 for a seminary of the Congregation of the Mission, after the suppression of the monastery by Russians during the time of the Partitions of Poland taken over by the diocese. It was built in the Baroque style, laid out on the plan of a Greek cross with a cupola above the transept. The 19th century neo-Gothic chapel adjacent to the church has a modern iconostasis designed by Jerzy Nowosielski and is today used by Greek Catholic alumni. The palace from the first half of the 17th century, with its relief decorated with scenes from Polish history is the oldest part of the monastery. The Neo-Baroque monumental wing of the monastery, designed by Władysław Siennicki, dates back to 1908. The complex is surrounded with a 19th-century neo-Gothic wall.

== Gallery ==
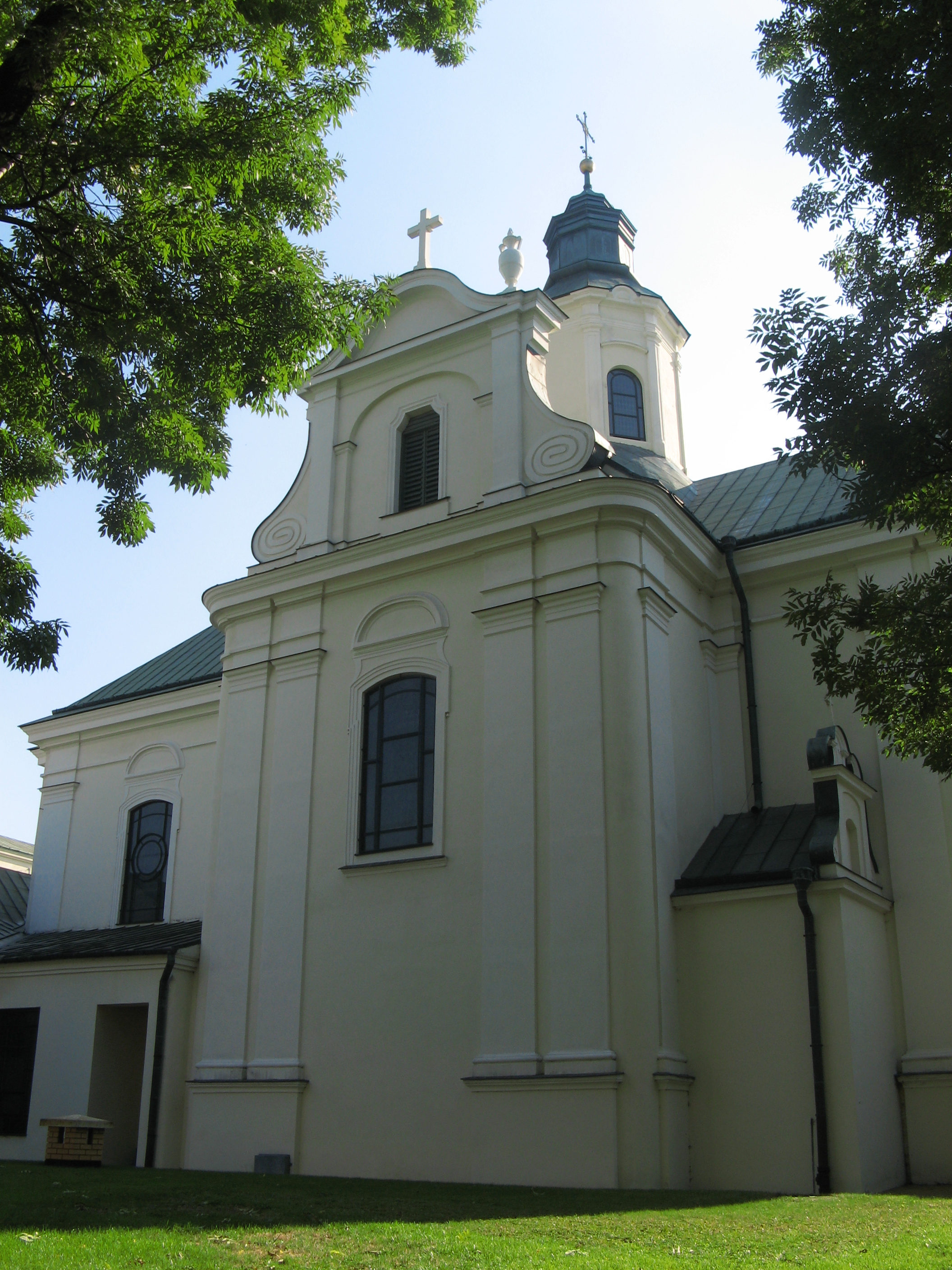

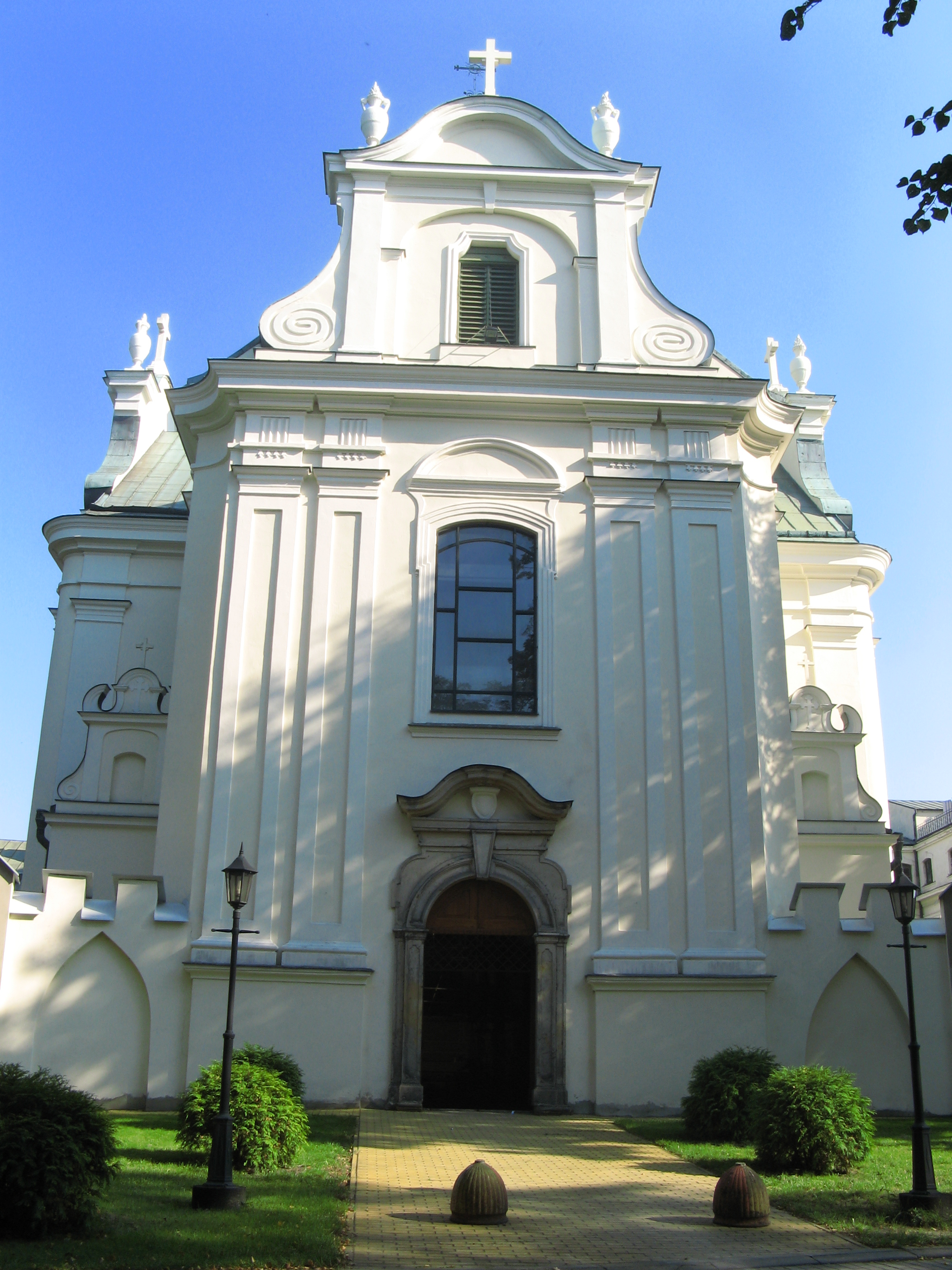

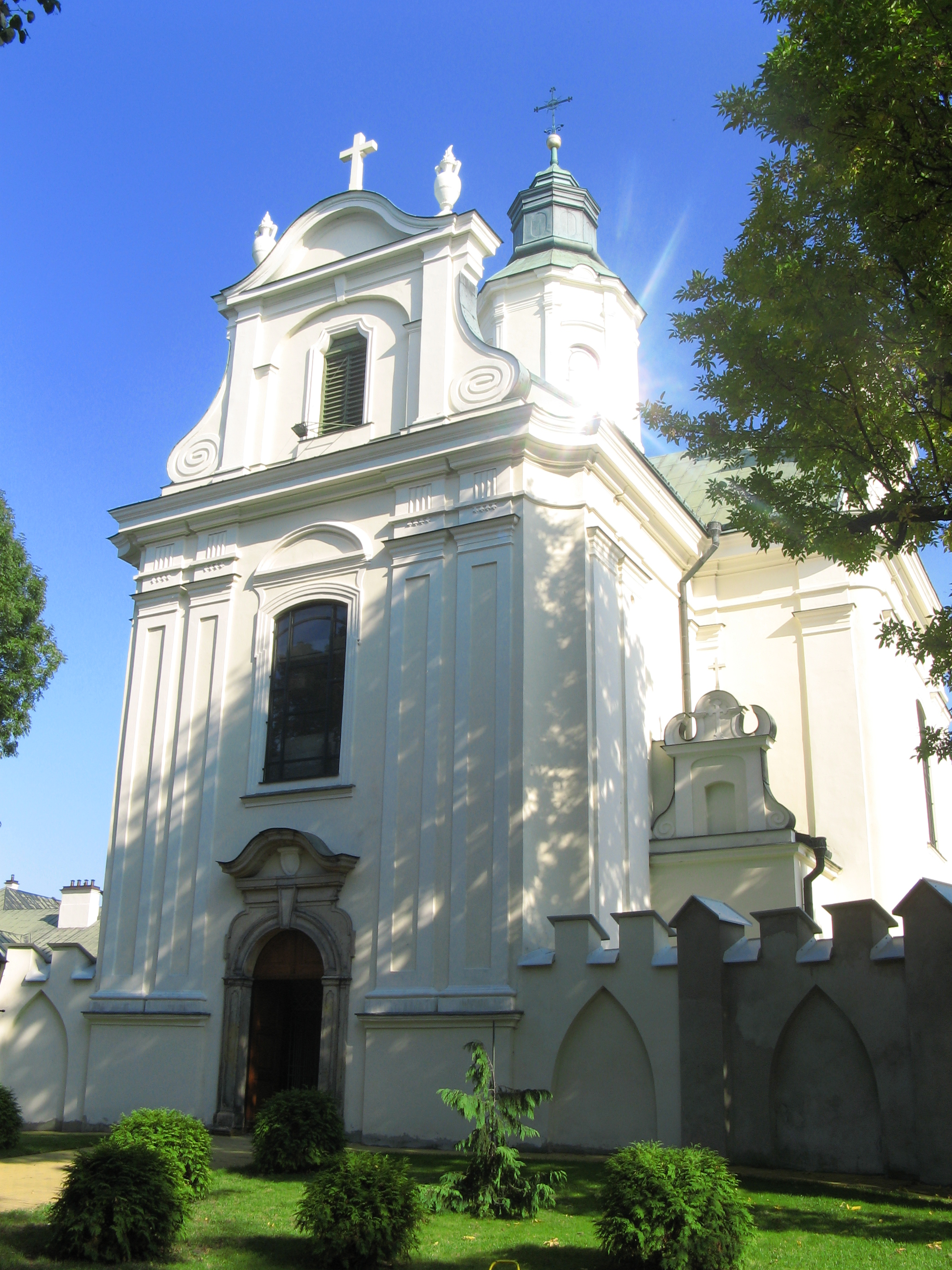

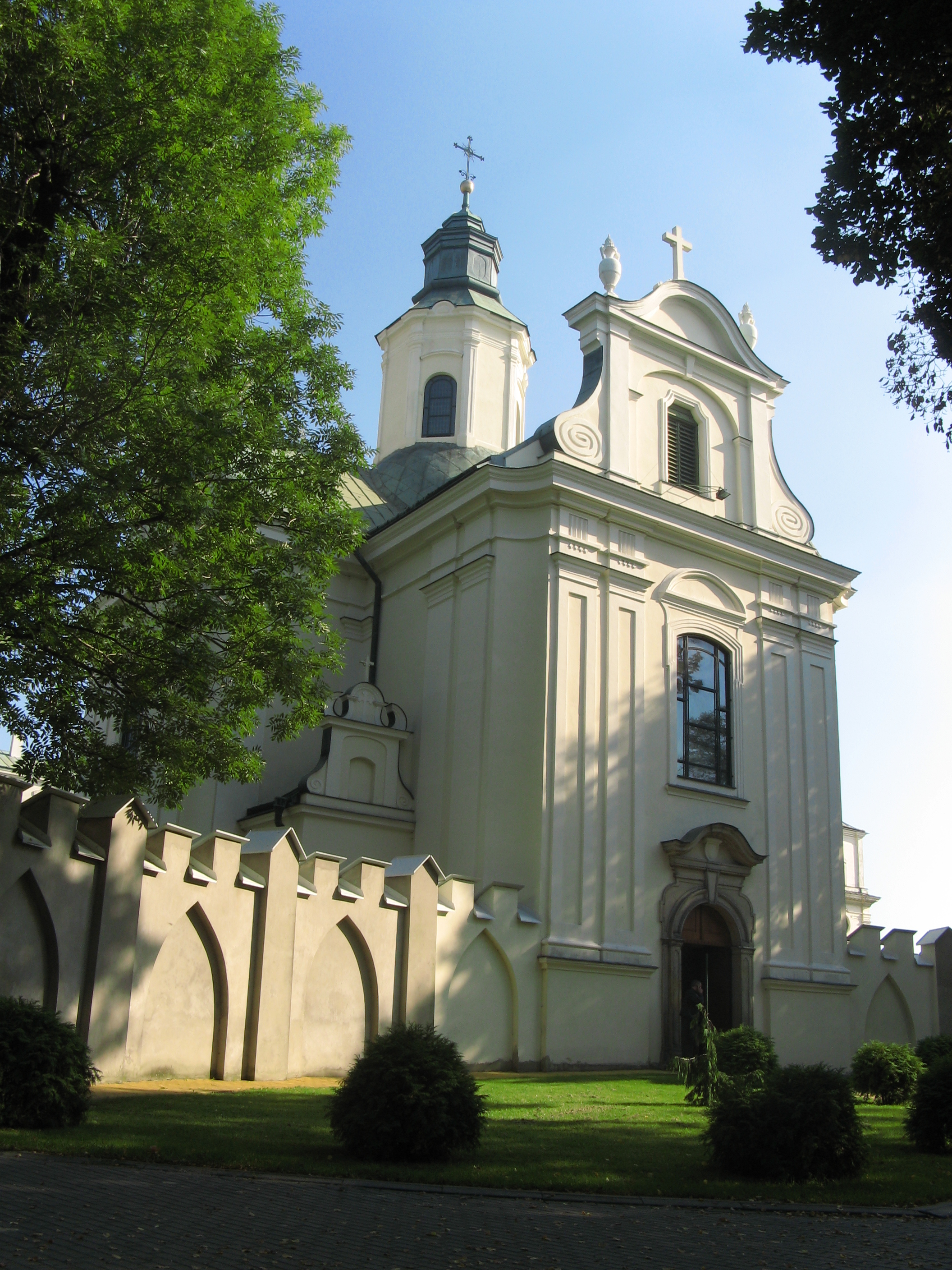

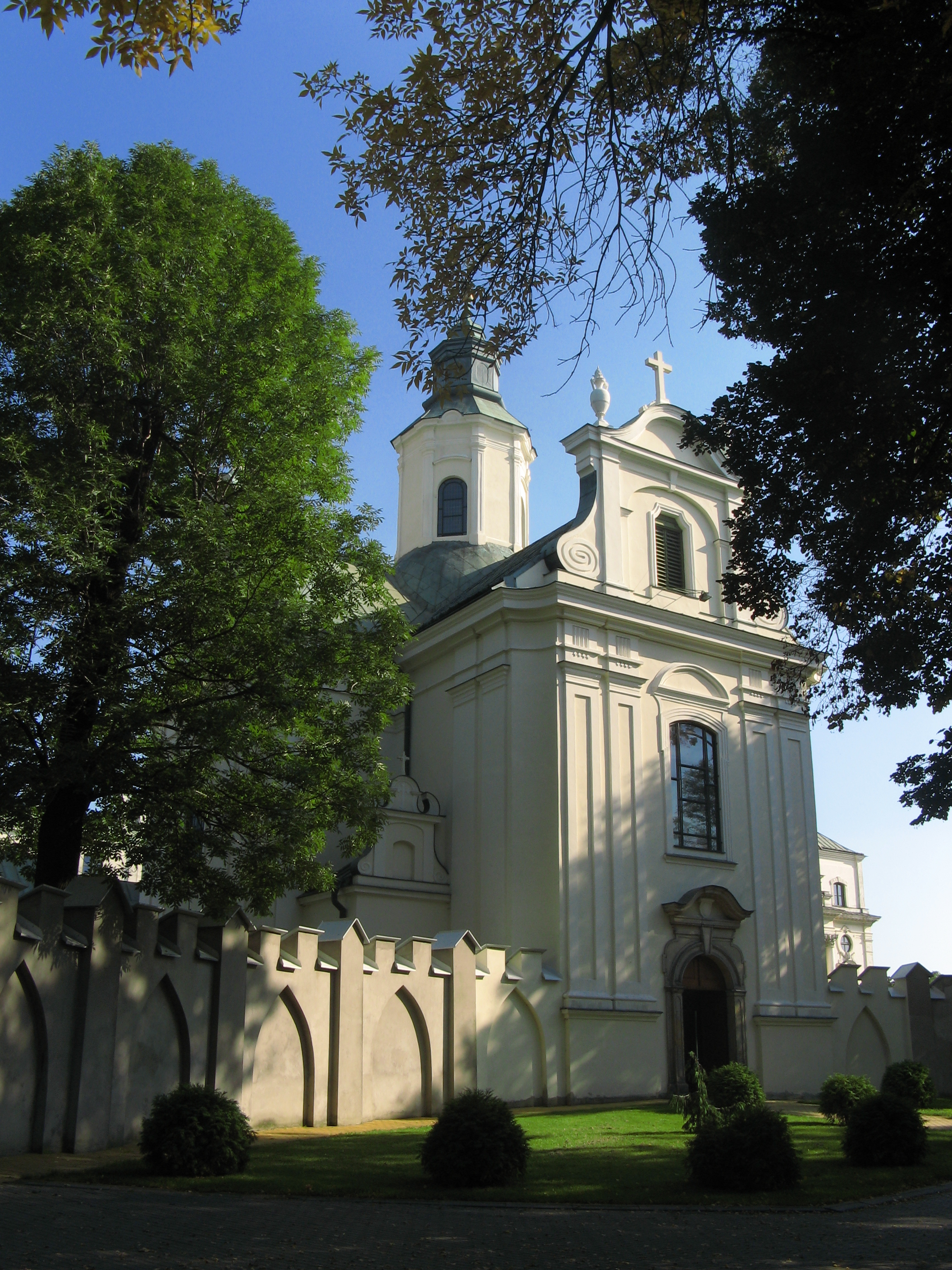

== Sources ==
- Historia seminarium (in Polish)
- Kościół i kaplica (in Polish)
