= Kazimierz Ostrowski Award =

Polish visual arts award

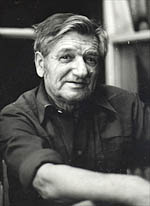
Kazimierz Ostrowski in 1975

The Kazimierz Ostrowski Award is one of the most important awards given to Polish artists and designers in recognition of their excellence. Founded in 2002, it is financed by the NDI construction group and presented annually by the Association of Polish Painters and Designers in Gdańsk. The official ceremony of the award is held in Gdańsk and is accompanied by an exhibition of the laureate's work.

The award was named after the Polish painter Kazimierz Ostrowski (1917-1999).

== Recipients ==
Source: NDI

- 2016: Janusz Lewandowski
- 2015: Lech Majewski
- 2014: Stanisław Białogłowicz
- 2013: Jarosław Modzelewski
- 2012: Stanisław Fijałkowski
- 2011: Zbigniew Makowski
- 2010: Stanisław Rodziński
- 2009: Tadeusz Dominik
- 2008: Aldona Mickiewicz
- 2007: Janina Kraupe
- 2006: Władysław Jackiewicz
- 2005: Maciej Świeszewski
- 2004: Stefan Gierowski
- 2003: Jacek Sempoliński
- 2002: Kiejstut Bereźnicki
- 2001: Teresa Pągowska

== See also ==
- List of European art awards
- Prizes named after people
