= Sempoliński =

Sempoliński is a surname. Notable people with the surname include:

- Jacek Sempoliński (1927–2012), Polish painter
- Joe Sempolinski (born 1983), American politician
- Ludwik Sempoliński (1899–1981), Polish film actor
