= Ryszard Grzyb =

Polish painter, poet and graphic designer

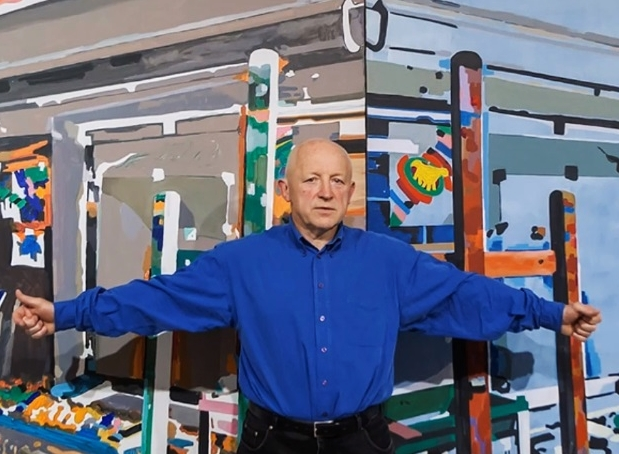
- Grzyb in 2016
- Born: Ryszard Grzyb; 17 July 1956 (age 70); Sosnowiec, Poland
- Education: Academy of Fine Arts in Warsaw
- Known for: Painting

Ryszard Henryk Grzyb (born 17 July 1956, in Sosnowiec), a Polish painter, poet, and graphic designer.

Born to a working-class family, Ryszard Henryk Grzyb gained his secondary education at the State High School of Fine Arts in Katowice in the years 1971–1976. In 1976–79, he was a student of Zbigniew Karpiński at the Eugeniusz Geppert Academy of Fine Arts in Wrocław. Subsequently, he moved to the Faculty of Painting at the Academy of Fine Arts in Warsaw to study under Rajmund Ziemski's tutelage. There he met Paweł Kowalewski, Jarosław Modzelewski, Włodzimierz Pawlak, Marek Sobczyk, and Ryszard Woźniak, who formed together an artist's group "Gruppa" in 1982. Grzyb was also a co-founder and editor of Gruppa's magazine Oj dobrze już (All Right, Then). He graduated with honours on 8 June 1981.

In the years 1983–1987, Grzyb painted mostly so-called papers, i.e. large tempera compositions on cardboard. In 1987, the artist changed his technique and gradually switched from tempera to oil on canvas. His work is characterised by jovial colours and broad lines painted around the edges of various objects.

While studying in Warsaw, Ryszard Henryk Grzyb was engrossed in poetry, besides painting. His poems were published in Nowy Wyraz magazine, issue 1980/4 and 1981/1, and in Miesięcznik Literacki monthly, issue 1981/7.

His paintings can be found in the collections of the National Museums in Warsaw, Wrocław, Cracow and Poznań, as well as in the Zachęta National Gallery of Art in Warsaw, in District Museums in Katowice, Bytom, Toruń, Bydgoszcz and Olsztyn, plus in private collections in Poland and abroad.

In 2004, he started a multimedia project Zdania napowietrzne (Air-borne sentences), which is a collection of short poetic sentences. The author calls them "ludicrous haiku" and puts them in a context that is completely disconnected from poetic experiments: on billboards, postcards, pencils, neon signs and information plates. Entering a space reserved for a different type of communication, the artist enhances the poems’ message and somehow creates suspense.

In 2010, Ryszard Henryk Grzyb received Jan Cybis Award.

== Bibliography ==
- Official website
- The aTAK Gallery about Ryszard Grzyb
- Zachęta National Gallery of Art about Ryszard Grzyb
- culture.pl about Ryszard Grzyb
