= Church of the Birth of the Blessed Virgin Mary, Biały Bór =

Church in West Pomeranian Voivodeship, Poland

Coordinates: 53°53′53.22″N 16°50′50.40″E

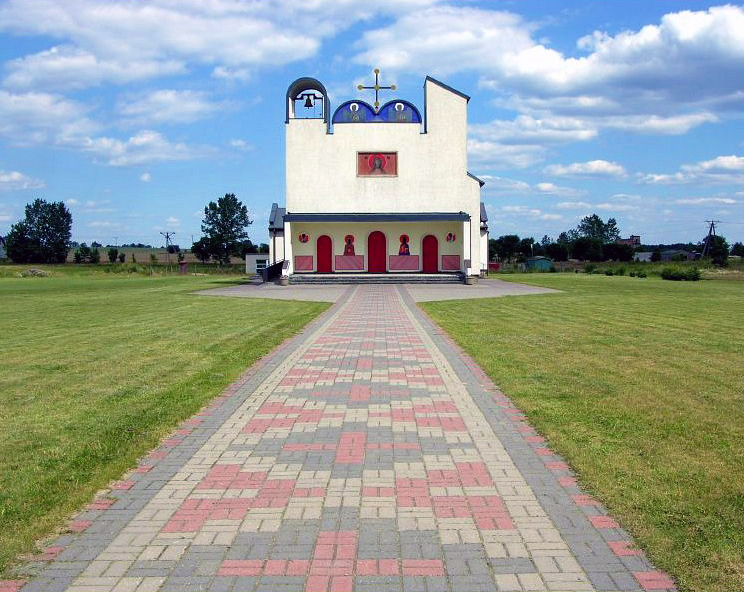
The Church of the Birth of the Blessed Virgin Mary

The Church of the Birth of the Blessed Virgin Mary (Polish: Cerkiew Narodzenia Przenajświętszej Bogarodzicy, Ukrainian: Церква Різдва Богородиці) is a modernistic church of the Ukrainian Greek Catholic Church in the city Biały Bór, Bazylego Hrynyka Street, in the West Pomeranian Voivodeship of Poland.

The church was built for the Ukrainian population of the village, displaced here during Operation Vistula 1947 from their homes in south-eastern parts of Poland.

The church was built from 1992 to 1997 after the design of Polish painter, professor Jerzy Nowosielski, with the collaboration of the architect Bogdan Kotarba.

The church was designed after the severe architecture of three-aisled early Christian basilicas. The dome shows the image of Christ Pantocrator. The color concept is based on the contrast of dark green walls and ceilings with white partitions and red door frames. The small iconostasis consists of only three icons, painted by Nowosielski.

During the pilgrimages thousands of worshipers remain outside the small church, and the flat main façade with three doors serves as a large iconostasis with two icons of Angels and the Veil of Veronica.

The Greek-Catholic parish of Biały Bór was established in 1957. It belongs to the Ukrainian Catholic Eparchy of Wrocław–Koszalin.
