= Ryszard Winiarski =

Polish postwar visual artist

- Born: May 2, 1936; Lwów, Second Polish Republic
- Died: December 14, 2006 (aged 70); Warsaw, Poland
- Education: Warsaw Institute of Technology, Warsaw Academy of Fine Arts
- Style: Geometric abstract art
- Movement: Conceptual art

Ryszard Winiarski (March 2, 1936 – December 4, 2006) was a Polish painter and set designer best known for his monochromatic abstract geometric compositions and spatial forms. He has been associated with Conceptualist tendencies in Poland during 1960s and 1970s and is considered one of the key representatives of indeterminism in Polish postwar art. Winiarski's work was informed by his interest in the relationship between art and science.

== Life and work ==
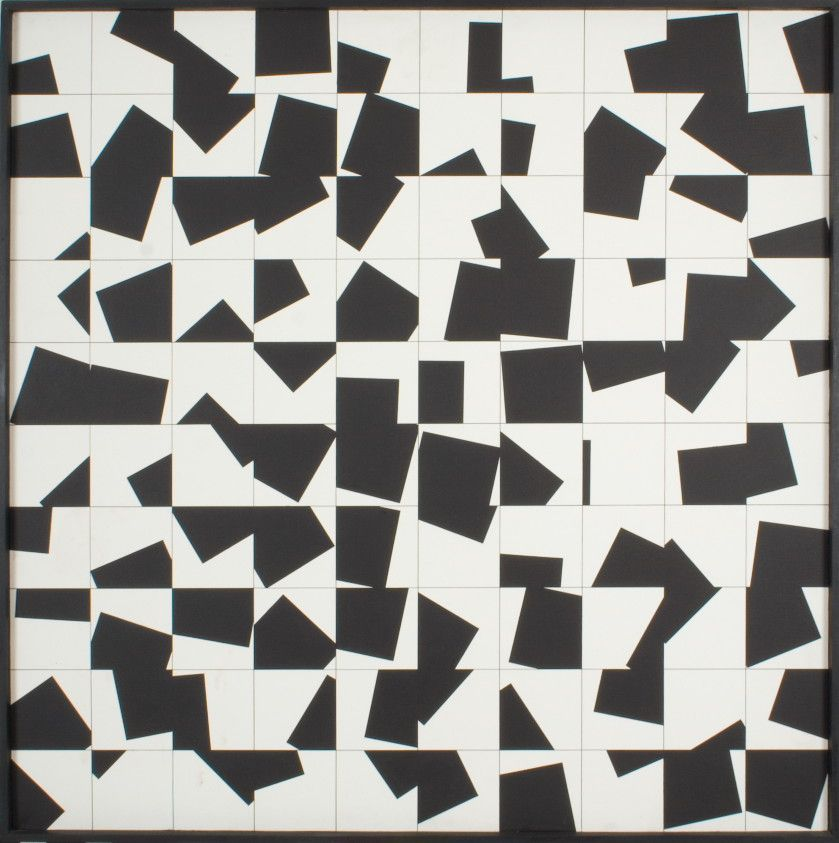
One hundred events 10x10, 1977

Ryszard Winiarski was born in Lwów, then part of the Second Polish Republic, on March 2, 1936. He studied at the Warsaw University of Technology from 1953 to 1959, graduating with a master's degree in precision mechanics. Subsequently, he pursued studies in painting under Aleksander Kobzdej at the Warsaw Academy of Fine Arts from 1958 to 1966. He later worked at the Warsaw Academy of Fine Arts as a lecturer and, between 1985 and 1990, as the vice-dean. In his art, Winiarski combined constructivist principles focused on geometry with elements of probability theory. This approach included the use of certain mathematical systems to compose and create visual forms.

Winiarski experimented with chance and probability by composing abstract arrangements of small squares, initially in black-and-white and later in color. Winiarski regarded the anonymous building blocks of a small square as "statistical material" from which to build the surface of the work. In 1966, Winiarski wrote: "My ambition involves attempts at visually recording events and presenting their statistical distributions visually. The multitude of possibilities that such treatment of the image offers fascinates me". Between 1967 and 1977, Winiarski created set designs for several plays performed in Poland, including Medea by Euripides, William Shakespeare's Othello and Macbeth, among others.

In 1987, he initiated the creation of geometric compositions using lit candles, a series titled Geometry, or a Chance for Meditation. Winiarski's works are included in permanent collections of major Polish museums, including the Museum of Art in Łódź and the National Museum in Kraków. Similarly to his contemporary Roman Opałka, Winiarski dedicated the majority of his career to exploring a singular conceptual project. In 1995 he received Jan Cybis Award. According to art historian and critic Bożena Kowalska, Ryszard Winiarski was among the most influential Polish artists in the second half of the twentieth century. Winiarski died in Warsaw on December 14, 2006, at the age of 70 following a long illness.
