= Jan Cybis Award =

Art award established in 1973 by the Association of Polish Artists and Designers

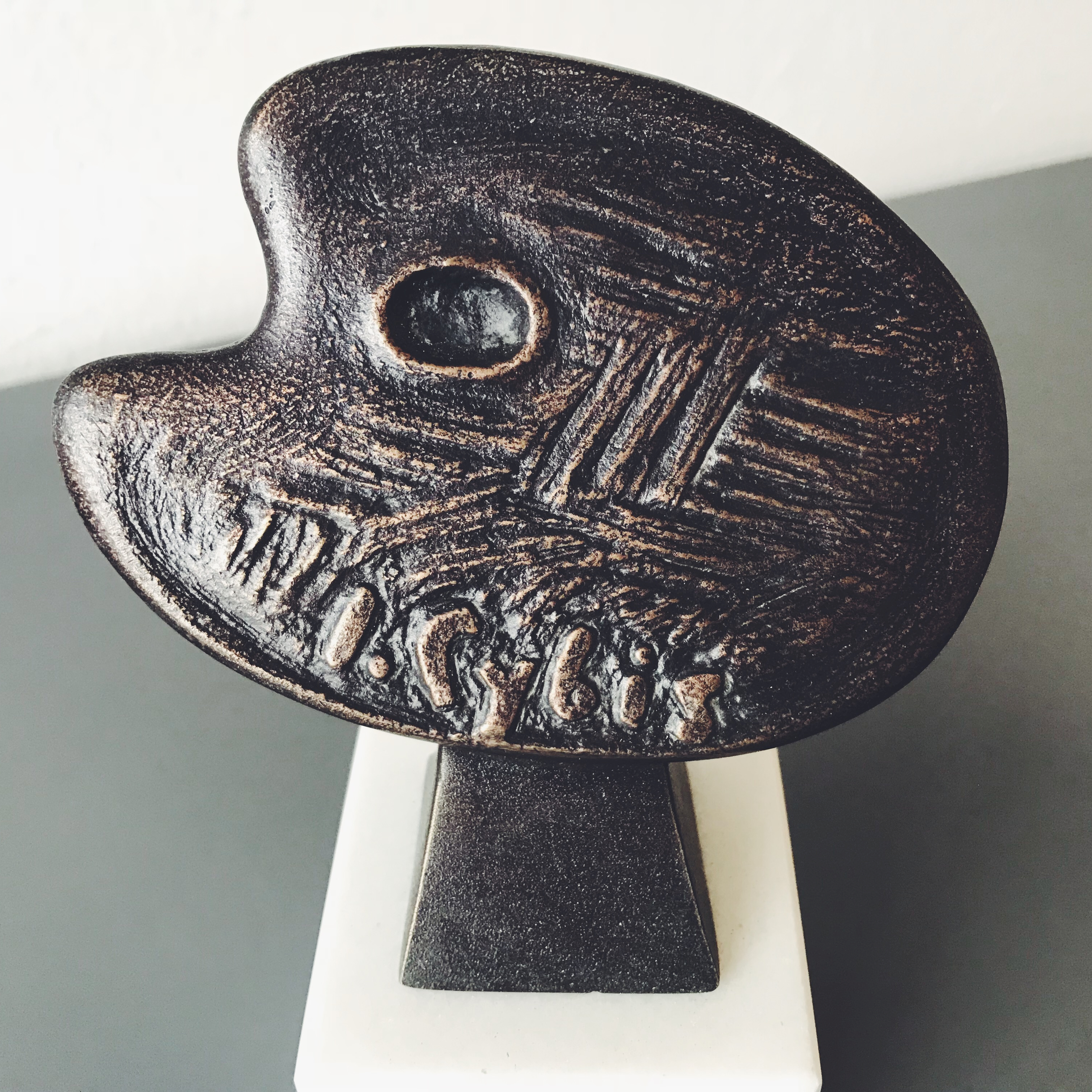
Award statuette

Jan Cybis Award is an art award established in 1973, awarded annually by the Warsaw District of the Association of Polish Artists and Designers. It is named after Jan Cybis.

== Recipients ==
Source.

- 1973 – Tadeusz Dominik
- 1974 – Krzysztof Bucki
- 1975 – Jan Dziędziora
- 1976 – Witold Damasiewicz
- 1977 – Jacek Sempoliński
- 1978 – Jan Berdyszak
- 1979 – Rajmund Ziemski
- 1980 – Stefan Gierowski
- 1981 – Barbara Jonscher
- 1982 – not awarded
- 1983 – Jacek Sienicki
- 1984 – Jerzy Tchórzewski
- 1985 – Jan Tarasin
- 1986 – Jerzy Panek
- 1987 – Jan Lebenstein
- 1988 – Jerzy Nowosielski
- 1989 – Stanisław Fijałkowski
- 1990 – Józef Czapski
- 1991 – Łukasz Korolkiewicz
- 1992 – Zbigniew Makowski
- 1993 – Henryk Błachnio
- 1994 – Jan Dobkowski
- 1995 – Ryszard Winiarski
- 1996 – Erna Rosenstein
- 1997 – Jerzy Mierzejewski
- 1998 – Leon Tarasewicz
- 1999 – Tomasz Ciecierski
- 2000 – Teresa Pągowska
- 2001 – Jadwiga Maziarska
- 2002 – Jacek Waltoś
- 2003 – Aleksandra Jachtoma
- 2004 – Jarosław Modzelewski
- 2005 – Jerzy Kałucki
- 2006 – Andrzej Dłużniewski
- 2007 – Roman Owidzki
- 2008 – Tomasz Tatarczyk
- 2009 – Robert Maciejuk
- 2010 – Ryszard Grzyb
- 2011 – Paweł Susid
- 2012 – Marek Sobczyk
- 2013 – Jadwiga Sawicka
- 2014 – Wojciech Fangor
- 2015 – Kōji Kamoji
- 2016 – Grzegorz Sztwiertnia
- 2017 – Włodzimierz Pawlak
- 2018 – Rafał Bujnowski
- 2019 – Wilhelm Sasnal – refused to accept the award
- 2020 – Magdalena Moskwa
- 2021 – Janusz Lewandowski
- 2022 – Andrzej Podkański
- 2023 – Grzegorz Pabel
- 2024 – Stanisław Baj
- 2025 – Tomasz Milanowski
