= Stanisław Waltoś =

Polish legal scholar and academic (born 1932)

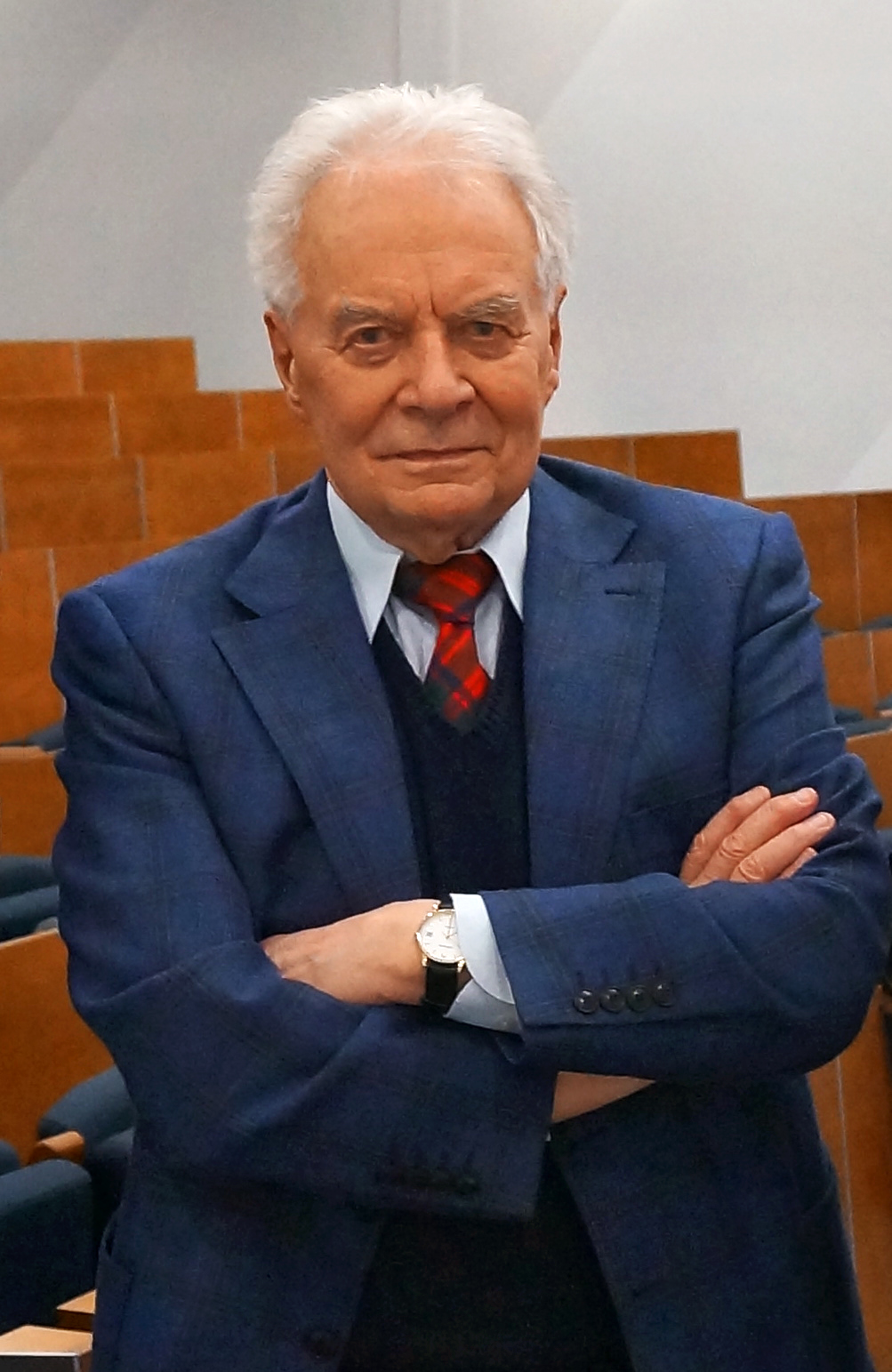
- Born: Stanisław Marian Waltoś; 9 February 1932; Stanisławów, Poland
- Citizenship: Polish
- Education: Jagiellonian University
- Occupations: legal scholar, academic

Stanisław Marian Waltoś (born 9 February 1932) is a Polish legal scholar and academic specializing in criminal law and legal history, professor of legal sciences, member of the Polish Academy of Sciences and the Polish Academy of Learning, professor of the Jagiellonian University, who was Head of the Department of Criminal Proceedings at the Faculty of Law of the Jagiellonian University from 1974, as well as the director of the Jagiellonian University Museum between 1977 and 2011.

In the 1990s he was an expert of the Council of Europe and the government of the Republic of Latvia. In 1987–1995 he was a member of the Commission for the Reform of Criminal Law in Poland. He participated in the work on Polish criminal codifications of 1997. He was the initiator of the introduction of anonymous witness and a turn state's evidence to the Polish criminal procedure. In 2000–2002 he was a member of the Legislative Council by the Prime Minister of Poland.

He authored about 400 academic papers and other works, including the regularly updated and re-issued academic textbook Proces karny: zarys systemu (Criminal Trial: The System Outline). Between 1985 and 2002 he was the editor-in-chief of the journals Archivum Iuridicum Cracoviense and Opuscula Muzealia (he took the position of editor-in-chief of the latter back in 2006). In 2006 he was elected the chairman of the Scientific Council of the Ossolineum National Institute.

== Life and work ==
=== Family and education ===
He was born in 1932 in Stanisławów, the son of Elma Cecylia née Buszyńska and Tadeusz Waltoś. His younger brother Jacek Waltoś was born in 1938.

Stanisław Waltoś attended the elementary school in Jasło until sixth grade. From 1946, he attended the Władysław Jagiełło High School in Dębica, where in 1950 he passed the matriculation examination with distinction. While in school, he was a member of the Polish Scouting Association, and was the commander of the scouts' poviat command in Dębica.

In 1954 he graduated in law from the Jagiellonian University. He mentioned Adam Vetulani, Marian Cieślak and Władysław Wolter as his “great masters”, that had decisive influence on his formation as a legal scholar.

=== Academic work ===
After completing his studies, he was prescripted to work at the District Prosecutor's Office in Kraków, where he was employed successively as an assessor, referendary and sub-prosecutor. In 1956, he was appointed an assistant at the Department of Criminal Proceedings at the Jagiellonian University. He was offered a position by Professor Marian Cieślak, who read his critical article on the penal code draft modeled on the Stalinist code.

In 1962 Stanisław Waltoś obtained a Ph.D. upon the dissertation Functions and forms of the indictment in a criminal trial, supervised by Marian Cieślak and subsequently awarded by the journal Państwo i Prawo. Between 1962 and 1964 he was a counselor at the District Prosecutor's Office in Kraków. In 1964, he received a habilitation scholarship and resigned from the work at the prosecutor's office.

In 1968 he obtained habilitation upon the work A model of preparatory proceedings against a comparative law background. In 1974, he was appointed the Head of the Department of Criminal Proceedings at the Faculty of Law of the Jagiellonian University. He obtained the title of associate professor in 1979, and full professor in 1987. In 2002 he retired, but continued to lecture at the University of Information Technology and Management in Rzeszów.

He published as author, co-author or editor about four hundred academic papers and other works, mainly in the field of criminal proceedings. These include the academic textbook Proces karny: zarys systemu (Criminal Trial: The System Outline), that has been resumed and updated several times. His research interests over the years have included: procedural rules, organization of the prosecutor's office, preparatory proceedings model, evidence issues (including the institution of the turn state's evidence and incognito witness), the principle of the fruit of the poisonous tree, as well as various aspects of the course of the trial, such as consensualism, analysis of the rights of participants in the proceedings against the background of the constitutional standard, press laws, special proceedings, issues of the validation of procedural acts, pragmatism and anti-pragmatism in criminal proceedings, procedural obstruction, i.e. abuse of law, excessive length of proceedings.

He collaborated on publications including with Kazimierz Buchała, Marian Cieślak and Andrzej Marek. In September 2004, he was awarded the Kraków Book of the Month Award for the book Na tropach doktora Fausta i inne szkice (On the Traces of Dr. Faust and Other Sketches).

He supervised three hundred and seventy master's theses and seventeen doctoral dissertations. A number of his doctoral students subsequently became specialists in law and criminal proceedings, including: Barbara Nita-Światłowska, Andrzej Światłowski, Dobrosław Szumało-Kulczyk and Antoni Bojańczyk.

Stanisław Waltoś was elected a correspondent member (2002) and then a real member (2007) of the Polish Academy of Sciences. He became a correspondent member (1996) and an active member (2008) of the Polish Academy of Learning. In 2001, he was elected a correspondent member of Nordrhein-Westphälische Akademie der Wissenschaften. He was the vice-chairman (1992–2002) and the chairman (2003–2007) of the Legal Sciences Committee of the Polish Academy of Sciences, the vice-chairman of the 'Poland in United Europe' Committee at the Presidium of the Polish Academy of Sciences (2002–2006), a member of the Presidium of the Polish Academy of Sciences Branch in Kraków (2002–2010), and a member of the Presidium of the Polish Academy of Sciences (2006–2011). He became a member of the Legal Sciences Committee of the Polish Academy of Sciences also for the 2020–2023 term.

In the years 1985–2002 he was the editor-in-chief of the journal Archivum Iuridicum Cracoviense, as well as the editor-in-chief of Opuscula Muzealia. He took the position of editor-in-chief of the latter back in 2006. He also became a member of the editorial board of the Czasopismo Prawno-Historyczne.

=== Social and public activities ===
From 1977 to 2011, he was the director of the Jagiellonian University Museum Collegium Maius. In this position he replaced the creator of the Museum, Karol Estreicher junior. He became the vice-chairman of the presidium of the Polish National Committee of the International Council of Museums (ICOM). Between 2004 and 2014 he was the chairman of the Permanent Conference of Directors of Kraków Museums. He became a member of the Presidium of the Social Committee for the Restoration of Historic Monuments in Kraków. In 2006 he was chosen the chairman of the Scientific Council of the Ossolineum National Institute.

In the 1980s, he participated in the work of the Center for Civic Legislative Initiatives of the Solidarity, which was a collaborating body with the democratic opposition. As he recalled, in 1990 he was offered to join the Poland's Supreme Court and become the president of the Supreme Court's Criminal Chamber. He refused, recommending his student Zbigniew Doda, who subsequently became a judge at the Supreme Court and the president of its Criminal Chamber.

In 1994–1997 Stanisław Waltoś was the chairman of the Foundation for the Jagiellonian University Council. In 1992–1997 he was an expert of the Council of Europe, and in 1994 an expert of the government of the Republic of Latvia. In 1987–1995 he was a member of the Commission for the Reform of Criminal Law. In the years 1995–2004 he was the secretary general of the Polish group Association Internationale de Droit Pénal, and in the years 1999–2003 chairman of the Association internationale des sciences juridiques.

He participated in the work on criminal codifications of 1997 in Poland. He was the initiator of the introduction to the Polish criminal procedure of an anonymous witness and a turn state's evidence. In 2000–2002 he was a member of the Legislative Council by the Prime Minister of Poland. In the years 2004–2006 he was the chairman of the Criminal Law Codification Commission, in the years 2009–2015 he was a member of this commission.

In 2015, he became a member of the honorary support committee for Bronisław Komorowski before the Polish presidential election.

He criticized the judicial reforms introduced in Poland since 2015 by Law and Justice, above all the reform of the penal code. In an interview in 2017, he stated that as a lawyer he would have wished “the independent and fairly functioning Constitutional Court restored (...), the authentic independence of judges a fact (...). The executive authority seeks to ensure its influence over the judiciary by selection of judges. (...) Thirdly, I wish the independence of prosecutors. I agree with those who say that the prosecutor should be obliged to follow orders. However, he should not be afraid of the consequences of taking his own position. And at the moment he has reason to be afraid.”

== Books ==
- Pitaval krakowski. Warszawa: Wydawnictwo Prawnicze. 1962. Co-author with Stanisław Salmonowicz and Janusz Szwaja. 5 editions until 2010.
- Akt oskarżenia w procesie karnym. Warszawa: Wydawnictwo Prawnicze. 1963.
- Zarys prawa karnego materialnego i procesowego. Kraków: Wydawnictwo Uniwersytetu Jagiellońskiego. 1971. Co-author with Kazimierz Buchała.
- Postępowanie szczególne w procesie karnym: postępowania kodeksowe. Warszawa: Polskie Wydawnictwo Naukowe. 1973.
- Proces karny w kazusach. Warszawa: Polskie Wydawnictwo Naukowe. 1974.
- Zasady prawa i procesu karnego. Warszawa: Polskie Wydawnictwo Naukowe. 1975. Co-author with Kazimierz Buchała.
- Krajobraz "Wesela". Kraków: Wawel-Tourist. 1982. 3 editions until 2000.
- Proces karny: zarys systemu. Warszawa: Polskie Wydawnictwo Naukowe. 1985. 10 editions until 2009.
- Świadek w procesie sądowym (Editor). Warszawa: Wydawnictwo Prawnicze. 1985.
- Podstawy prawa i procesu karnego. Warszawa: Wydawnictwo Prawnicze PWN. 1999. Co-author with Andrzej Marek. 4 editions until 2008.
- Collegium Maius Uniwersytetu Jagiellońskiego. Kraków: Karpaty. 1999.
- Naczelne zasady procesu karnego. Warszawa: Wydawnictwo Prawnicze. 1999.
- Na tropach doktora Fausta i inne szkice. Warszawa: Wydawnictwa Szkolne i Pedagogiczne. 2004.
- Owoce zatrutego drzewa. Kraków: Universitas. 2010.
- Zagadnienia dowodowe w procesie karnym (Editor). Kraków: Wydawnictwo Uniwersytetu Jagiellońskiego. 2011. Editor.
- Grabież Ołtarza Wita Stwosza. Warszawa: Wolters Kluwer. 2015.
- Wędrowanie po wyspach pamięci (Memoir). Warszawa: Wolters Kluwer. 2019.
- Czy profesor powinien mieć psa… i inne eseje. Warszawa: Wolters Kluwer. 2022.

== Awards and honors ==
=== Distinctions ===
- Commander's Cross with Star of the Order of Polonia Restituta (2011)
- Commander's Cross of the Order of Polonia Restituta (1998)
- Knight's Cross of the Order of Polonia Restituta (1980)
- Gold Cross of Merit (1976)
- Gold Medal for Merit to Culture – Gloria Artis (2005)
- Honoris Gratia badge from the mayor of Kraków (2005)

=== Honorary doctorates ===
- Honoris causa degree of the Maria Curie-Skłodowska University (2004)
- Honoris causa degree of the Immanuel Kant Baltic Federal University (2007)
- Honoris causa degree of the University of Warsaw (2011)

=== Awards ===
- Award of the Minister of National Education of Poland, 1st degree (1986)
- “Merentibus” Medal awarded by the Senate of the Jagiellonian University (2001)
- Aleksander Gieysztor Award awarded by the Kronenberg Foundation at Citi Handlowy “for caring for the good of Polish culture, manifesting itself in consistent efforts to strengthen the position of the Jagiellonian University Museum, as well as for spreading and promoting the achievements of Polish culture in the world” (2003)
- Kraków Book of the Month Award for the book Na tropach doktora Fausta i inne szkice (2004)
- Edwarda J. Wende Award awarded by the Foundation for Poland (Fundacja dla Polski) “for special achievements in the field of promoting and raising legal culture and implementation of the idea of the rule of law” (2010)
- Jagiellonian University Medal “Plus ratio quam vis” (2007)
- Gold Medal of the National Museum in Kraków (2007)
- Gold Medal of the University of Wrocław (2010)
