= Tadeusz Dominik =

Polish artist

- Born: 14 January 1928; Szymanów, Second Polish Republic
- Died: 20 May 2014 (aged 86); Warsaw
- Resting place: Powązki Military Cemetery
- Education: Academy of Fine Arts in Warsaw
- Known for: Painting, sculpture
- Awards: Order of Polonia Restituta; Gloria Artis Medal for Merit to Culture

Tadeusz Dominik (14 January 1928 – 20 May 2014) was a Polish painter, draftsman, and art professor.

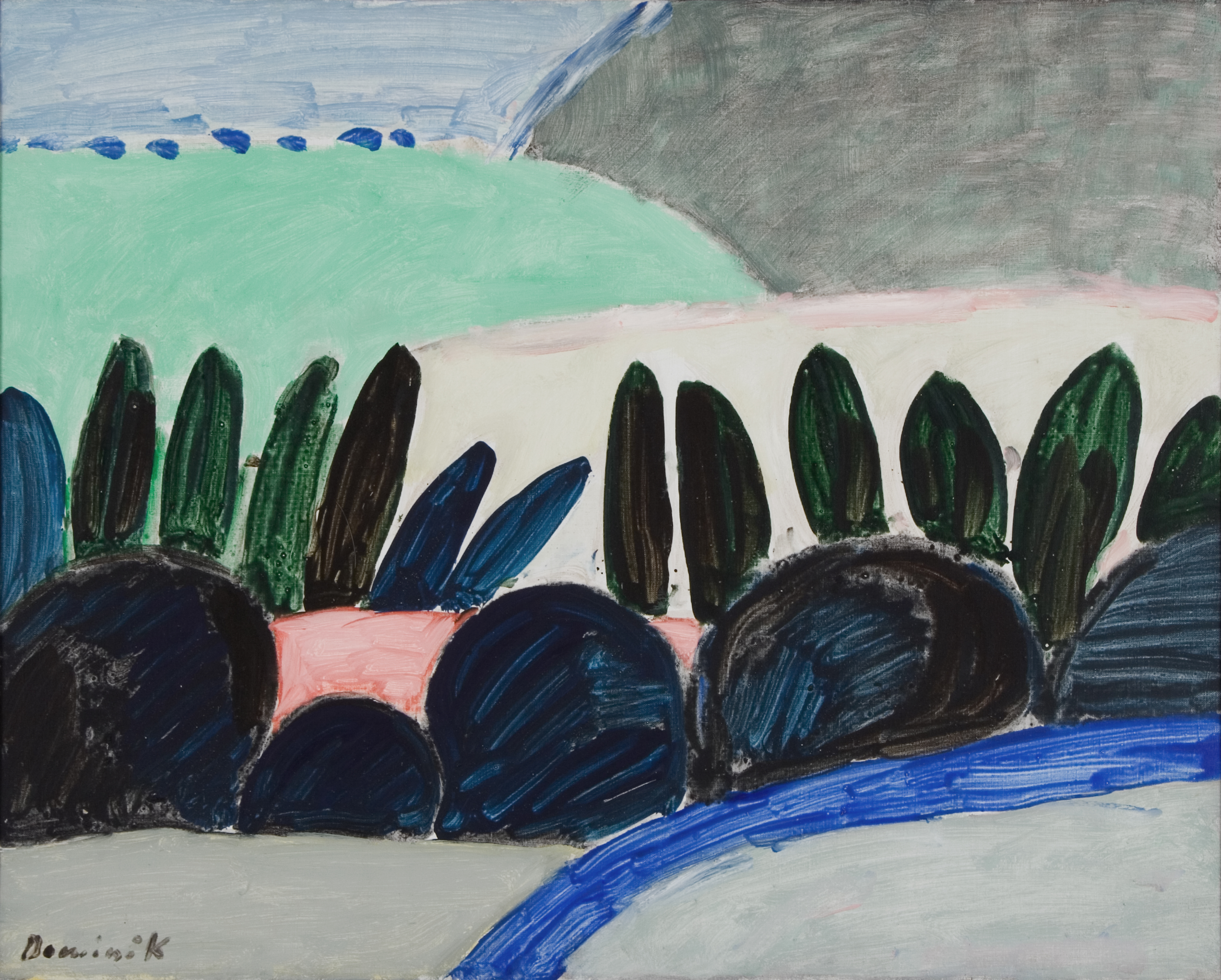
Tadeusz Dominik, Landscape, 1988

Dominik was born in Szymanów near Góra Kalwaria. He studied painting at the Academy of Fine Arts in Warsaw and received his degree in the painting studio of Prof. Jan Cybis in 1953. He taught at his alma mater from 1951 until his death in 2014. From 1958 until 1959, Dominik resided in Paris thanks to a French government scholarship. During the period of 1961 until 1962, he worked in the United States as a scholar of the Ford Foundation. Dominik died in Warsaw on May 20, 2014, at the age of 85.

== Awards ==
- 1964 – Festiwal International d'art. Contemporain, Monte Carlo
- 1973 – Jan Cybis Prize, Warsaw
- 2010 – The Kazimierz Ostrowski Award, Gdansk
