= Kazimierz Ostrowski =

Polish painter (1917–1999)

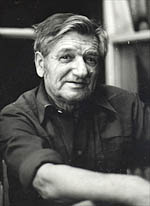
- Kazimierz Ostrowski in 1975
- Born: February 14, 1917; Berlin
- Died: July 12, 1999 (aged 82); Gdynia
- Spouse: Halina Krywald
- Children: 2
- Relatives: Kazimierz Zygmunt (brother)

Kazimierz Ostrowski (February 14, 1917, in Berlin – July 12, 1999, in Gdynia) was a Polish painter.

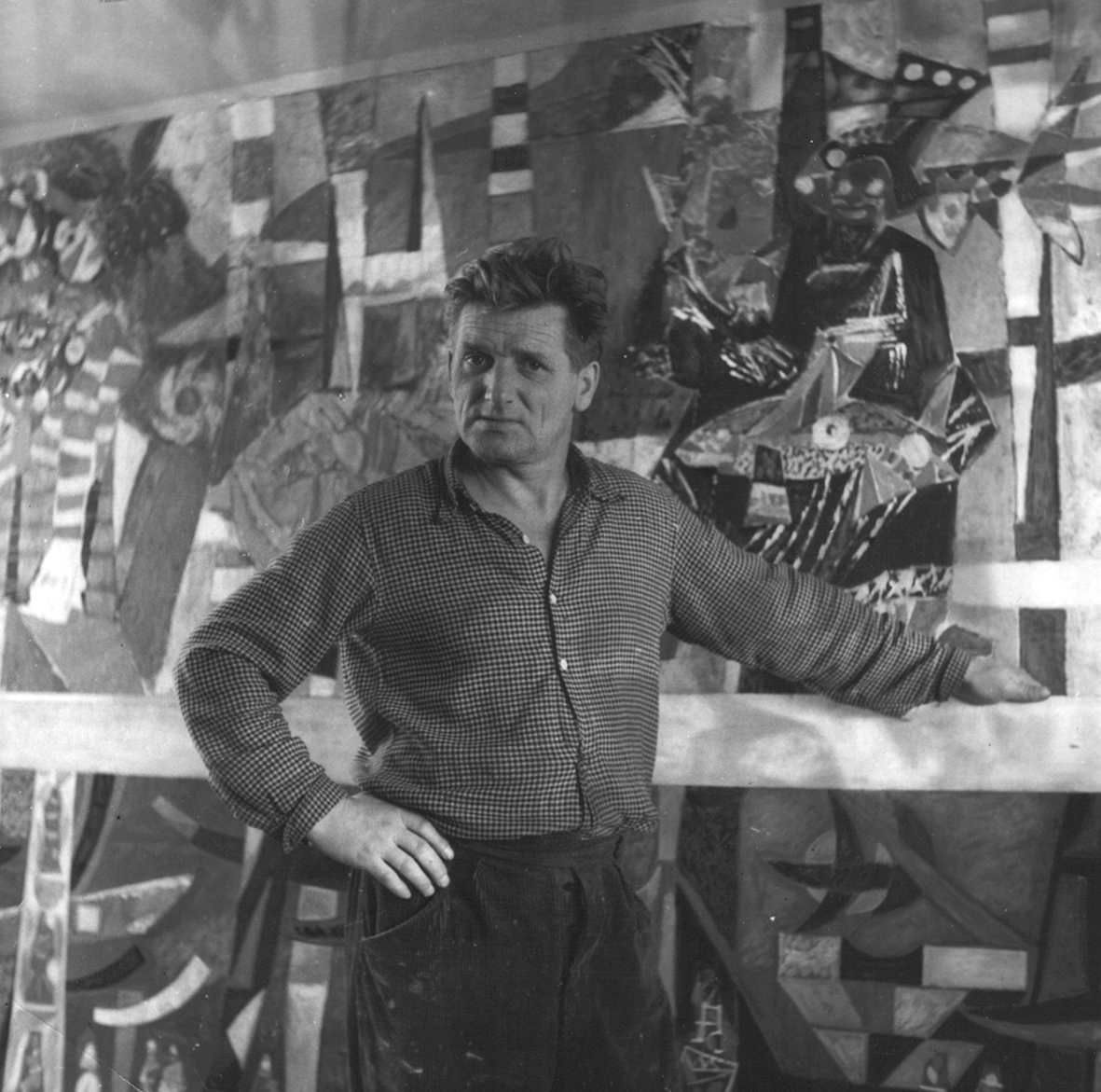
Kazimierz Ostrowski, 1960

== Biography ==
Kazimierz Ostrowski was born on February 14, 1917, in Berlin. In 1920, his family moved to Poznań. In 1934, Ostrowski left for Gdynia where together with his brother Zygmunt he painted signs and names of ships (among others SS Kościuszko and MS Batory).

After World War II in 1945, he reported together with his father and two brothers to the Urban Office in Gdynia where he was given the task of changing the street names and signs on the buildings of State institutions. In the same year he began his painting studies at the Academy of the Fine Arts in Sopot.

In 1949, he received a scholarship from the French government to study in Paris where he apprenticed to the famous French painter Fernand Léger. In 1950, he came back to Gdynia and married Halina Krywald, with whom he had two children. From 1964 to 1987, he was professor in the painting atelier at the Academy of Fine Arts in Gdańsk. In October 1981, he received the title of associate professor.

Ostrowski presented his paintings on more than 60 individual and collective exhibitions. He was awarded with approximately 20 different awards.

== Honors ==
- 1957 – First prize for painting in the First Exhibition of Polish young painting, sculpture and graphics
- 1959 – Artistic award of the city of Gdynia
- 1970 – Golden Cross of Merit
- 1974 – Commemorative medal for his efforts for the city from the MRN Presidium in Gdynia
- 1974 – Award of the President of the City of Gdynia for the entirety of his creative work
- 1976 – Medal from the Mayor of the City of Gdynia on the occasion of the 50th anniversary of the city
- 1982 – First prize of the Ministries of Culture and Arts
- 1985 – First prize of PWSSP-Vice-chancellor in Gdańsk
- 1988 – Officers’ Cross of the Order of Polonia Restituta
- 1991 – Award from the District of Gdańsk for his work as an outstanding artistic teacher
- 1995 – Artistic award of the Mayor of the City of Gdynia
- 2002 – Kazimierz Ostrowski Award named after Kazimierz Ostrowski

On July 12, 1999, Ostrowski died in his flat-atelier in 62 Abrahama Street in Gdynia. On the facade of the building a commemorative bronze plate was uncovered in October 26, 2006.

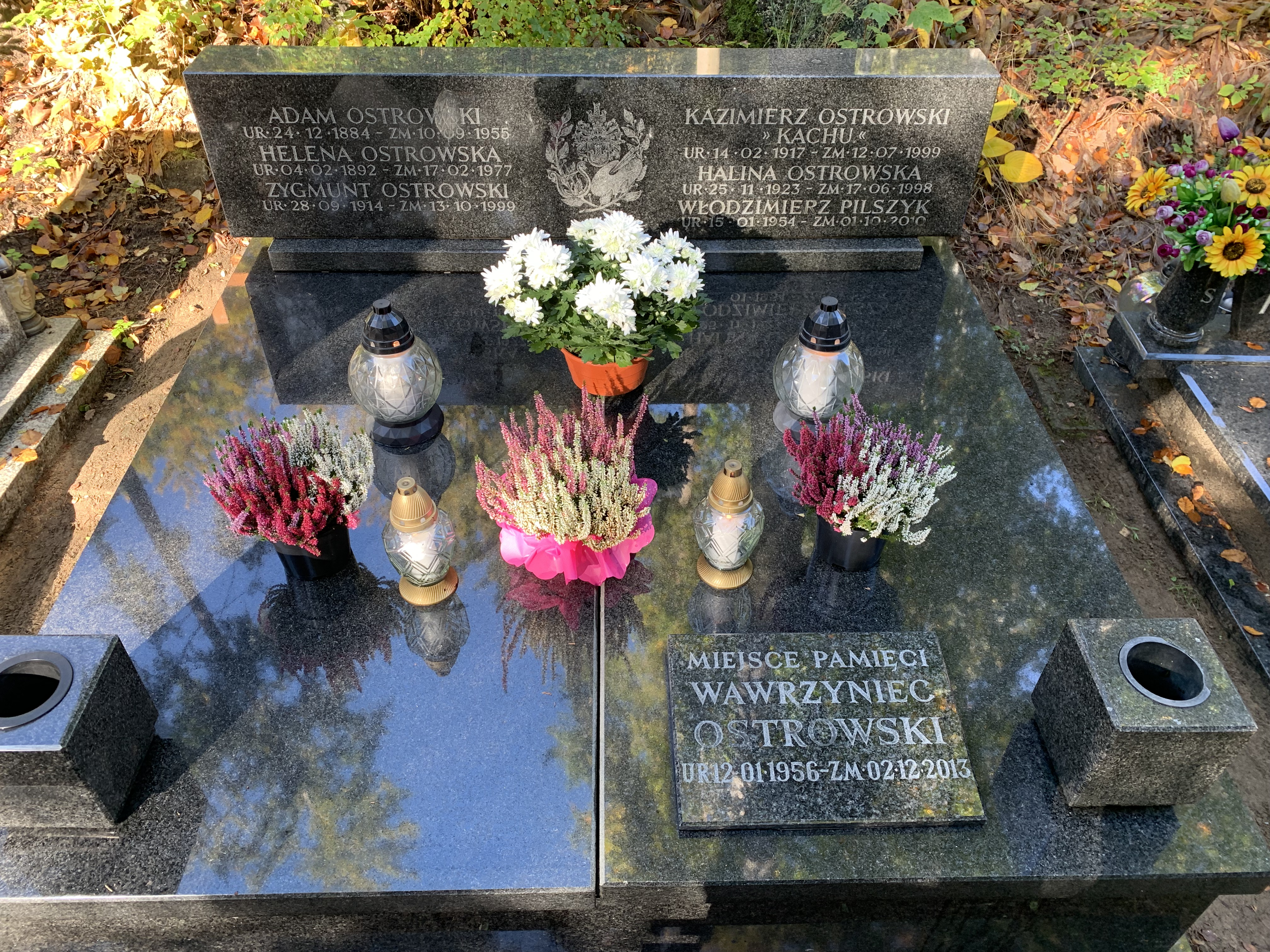
Grób_rodziny_Ostrowskich_na_cmentarzu_Witomińskim_w_Gdyni
