= Roman Bratny =

Polish writer, poet, columnist, playwright, and screenwriter (1921–2017)

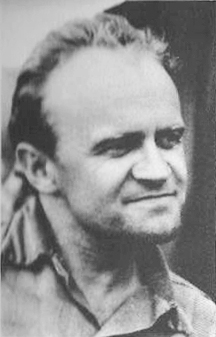
- Roman Bratny, c. 1961
- Born: Roman Mularczyk; 5 August 1921; Kraków
- Died: 6 November 2017 (aged 96); Radzie
- Citizenship: Polish
- Occupations: Writer, poet, screenwriter, columnist, playwright
- Spouse(s): Joanna Żwirska (Halszka), Alicja Wahl

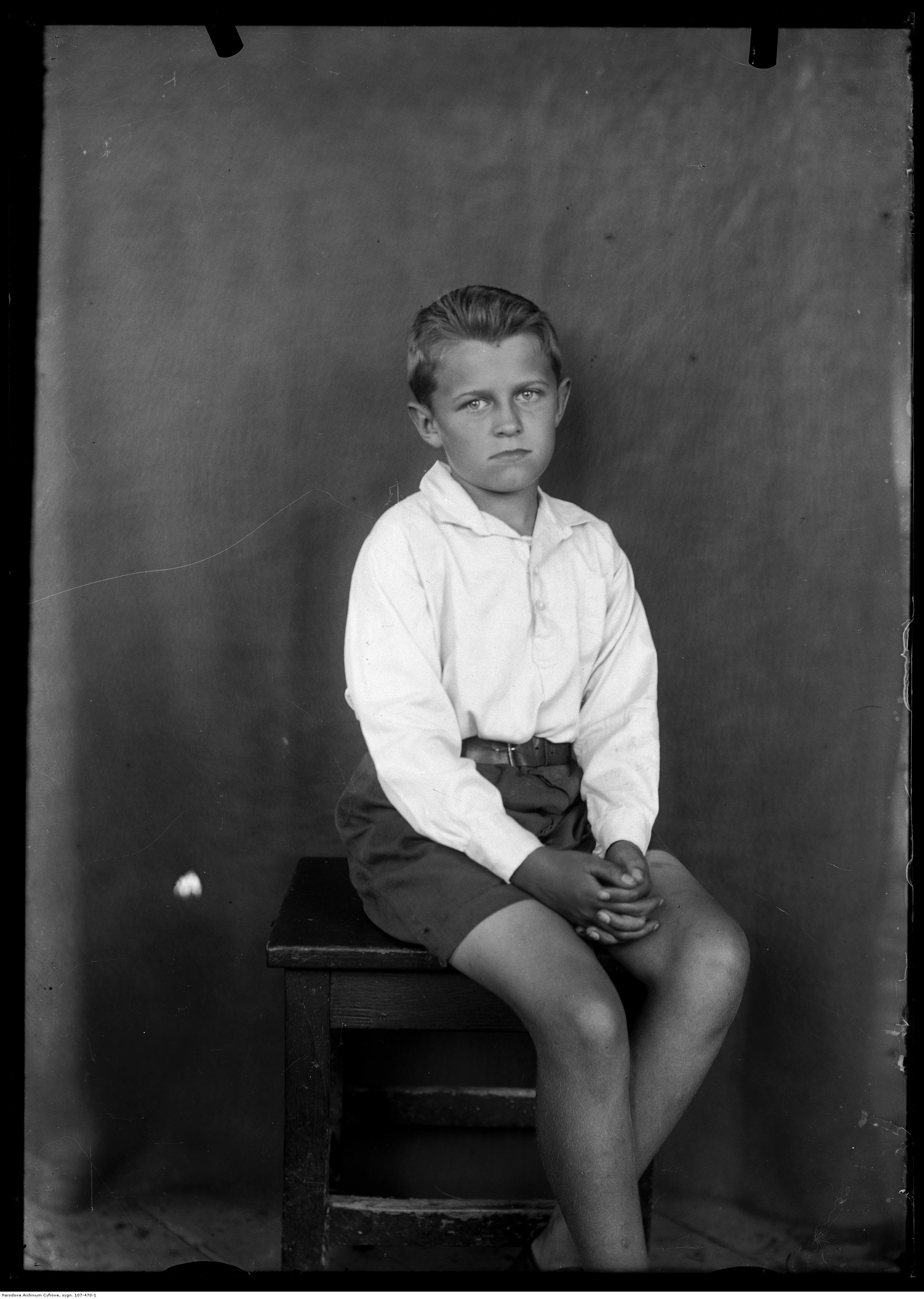
Roman Mularczyk in 1932, photographed by Narcyz Witczak-Witaczyński

Roman Jerzy Bratny born Mularczyk (5 August 1921 – 6 November 2017) was a prose writer, poet, columnist, playwright and screenwriter.

== Biography ==
He was the son of Józef Mularczyk and Wanda née Repetowska, brother of Andrzej Mularczyk.

He fought in the Warsaw Uprising as deputy platoon commander in the “Bełt” battalion (Śródmieście-Południe “Sławbor” Group).

In 1949 he joined Polish United Workers' Party and remained its member until its dissolution in 1990. He was married to Joanna Żwirska (Halszka). In 1955 he married Alicja Wahl, they had a daughter, Julia.

== Works ==
=== Poetry books ===
- Pogarda. 1944.
- Losy. 1948.
- 15 batalionów. 1948.
- W karty z historią. 1948.
- Słowo miliarda. 1949.
- Człowieku, żyć będziesz. 1951.
- Wiersze wybrane. 1957.

=== Collections of short stories ===
- Ślad. 1946.
- Ile serce wytrzyma. 1953.
- Rola główna. 1953.
- Kryśka Brzytew. 1955.
- Spacer w ZOO. 1961.
- Wybór opowiadań. 1963.
- Historia najnowsza Polski u Antka Półgłówki. 1964.
- Przesłuchanie Pana Boga. 1969.
- Opowiadania. 1969.
- Izba tonów i drwina. 1970.
- Noc księżycowa. 1971.
- Sześć osób pierwszych. 1972.
- Zgoda na gniew. 1974.
- Hobby wielkie jak łoś. 1976.
- Wybór opowiadań. 1976.
- Radość nagrobków. 1978.
- Czwartki ubogich. 1979.
- Koszenie pawi. 1983.
- Racja wilków. 1983.
- Twarde ojczyzny. 1984.
- Honor germańskiego bobra. 1985.
- Co las mi powiedział. 1987.
- Żarty. 1987.
- Klapa, czyli Pan Bóg rozdaje karty. 1987.
- Przyducha. 1988.
- Bez diabła. 1989.
- Błazen Królestwa Niebieskiego. 1989.
- Paradoks istnienia. 1989.
- "Jeżeli żyjesz" i inne opowiadania. 1989.
- List gończy. Komiks quasi-utopijny. 1990.
- Puste poduszki. 1990.
- Rok 199?, czyli Dziura w Płocie. 1990.
- Szaleństwo Rewizora. 1990.
- Super Prezydent. 1991.
- Tryptyk paradoksalny. 1992.
- Dzieci Ojca Świętego. 1994.
- Historie miłosne pod psem. 1995.

=== Novels ===
- Krok ostateczny. 1955.
- Kolumbowie. Rocznik 20. 1957.
- Szczęśliwi torturowani. 1959.
- Śniegi płyną. 1961.
- Życie raz jeszcze. 1962.
- Brulion. 1962.
- Nauka chodzenia. 1965.
- Ciągle wczoraj; Ciemięga i inni; Nauka chodzenia. 1968.
- Trzech w linii prostej. 1970.
- Ile jest życia. 1971.
- Pięć opowieści. 1974.
- Losy. 1973.
- Lot ku ziemi. 1976.

=== Plays ===
- Pobita kra. 1949.
- Zwycięstwo Gralaków. 1950.
- Ludzie, którzy rosną. 1952.
- Przeciw krzywdzie. 1952.
- Sześć godzin ciemności. 1952.
- Spór o wiek XX-sty. 1956.
- Przesłuchanie Pana Boga. 1960.
- Trzecia strona. 1960.
- Urodziny. 1974.

=== Collections of columns ===
- Głos bomby Ishi. 1953.
- Rok myśliwego. 1993.

=== Non-fiction books ===
- Niespokojne tropy. Wrażenia z podróży do ZSRR. 1959.
- Tygodnie zdumienia. 1971.

=== Memories ===
- Pamiętnik moich książek. Vol. 1. 1978.
- Pamiętnik moich książek. Vol. 2. 1983.

=== Screenplays ===
- Trudna miłość (1954)
- Powrót (1960)
- Śniegi płyną (1963), television show
- Naganiacz (1964)
- Zerwany most (1964)
- Życie raz (1965)
- Niedziela sprawiedliwości (1965)
- Kontrybucja (1967)
- Przeszło, nie minęło (1968), television show
- Kolumbowie (1970), TV series
- Ile jest życia (1974), TV series
- Czwartki ubogich (1981)
- Piwko i Zdesperowany (1982), television show

== Awards ==
- Medal of the 10th Anniversary of People's Poland (19 January 1955)
- Officer's Cross of the Order of Polonia Restituta (1959)
- Order of the Banner of Labour, 2nd class (1964)
- Bronze Medal of Merit for National Defence (1966)
- Medal of the 40th Anniversary of People's Poland (1984)
- Order of the Banner of Labour, 1st class (1986)

== Bibliography ==
- Nawrocki, Witold (1972). Bratny. Warszawa: Agencja Autorska i Zjednoczenie Księgarskie. Translated into French: B. Grzegorzewska. Varsovie 1973.
- Macużanka, Zenona (1982). Roman Bratny. Warszawa: Państwowy Instytut Wydawniczy.
- Marat, Emil (2024). Bratny. Hamlet rozstrzelany. Wołowiec: Wydawnictwo Czarne.
