= Jacek Mierzejewski =

Polish painter (1883–1925)

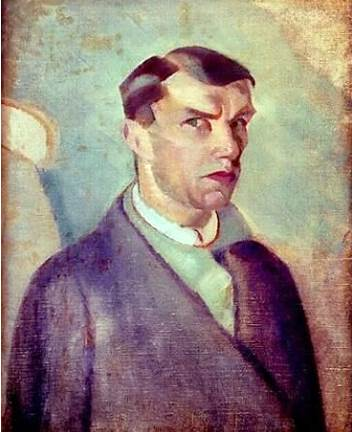
Self-portrait (1915)

Jacek Mierzejewski (1883, Częstochowa - 1925, Otwock) was a Polish painter, associated with "Formism", a Polish art movement that combined Cubism, Impressionism and Futurism.

== Biography ==
He began his studies at the Warsaw School of Drawing, then enrolled at the Krakow Academy of Fine Arts, where he studied with Florian Cynk, Leon Wyczółkowski and Józef Mehoffer. In poor health after 1905, he spent much of his free time at the resort in Zakopane.

In 1913, he received a scholarship that enabled him to study in France, where he spent most of his time in Paris and Brittany. The works of Cézanne became a major influence there. His first major exhibition was with the Kraków Society of Friends of Fine Arts in 1916.

During this time, he was diagnosed with tuberculosis. He returned to Poland after the war and settled in Piotrowice near Nałęczów, the site of a well-known sanatorium. He died of his illness in 1925.

In addition to paintings, he produced etchings and lithographs. He also illustrated children's books and textbooks and did satirical cartoons for the short-lived (1911–12) biweekly magazine Abdera. In 1923, he displayed toys and Christmas decorations he had designed, at the Exhibition of the Decorative Arts in Monza.

His sons, Andrzej and Jerzy also became well-known painters.

== Selected paintings ==
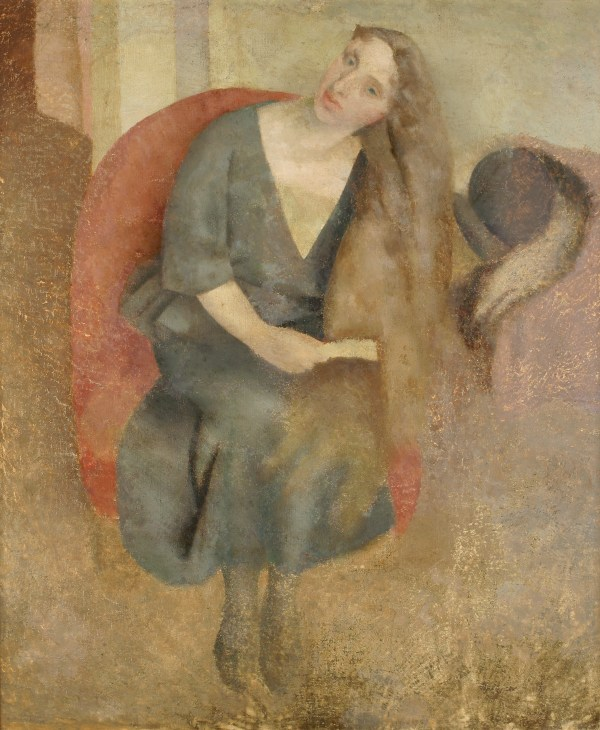
Woman Combing Her Hair

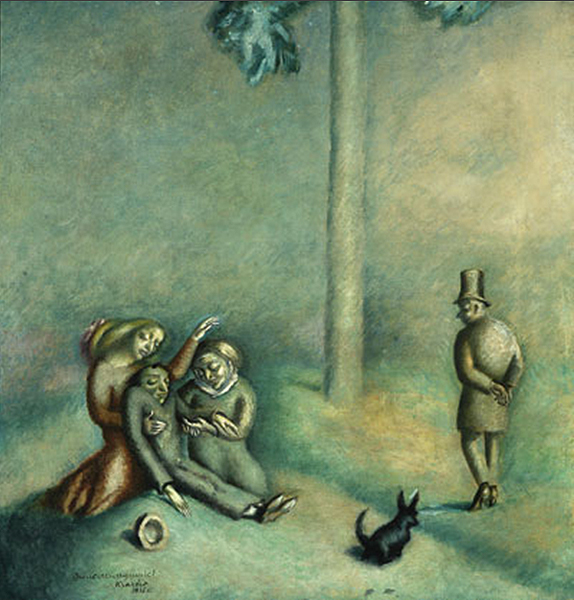
A "Goner"

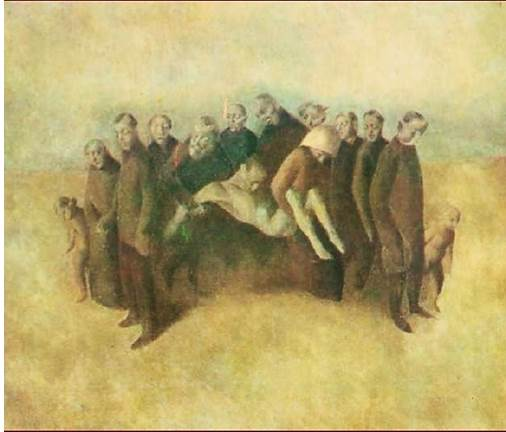
Burial

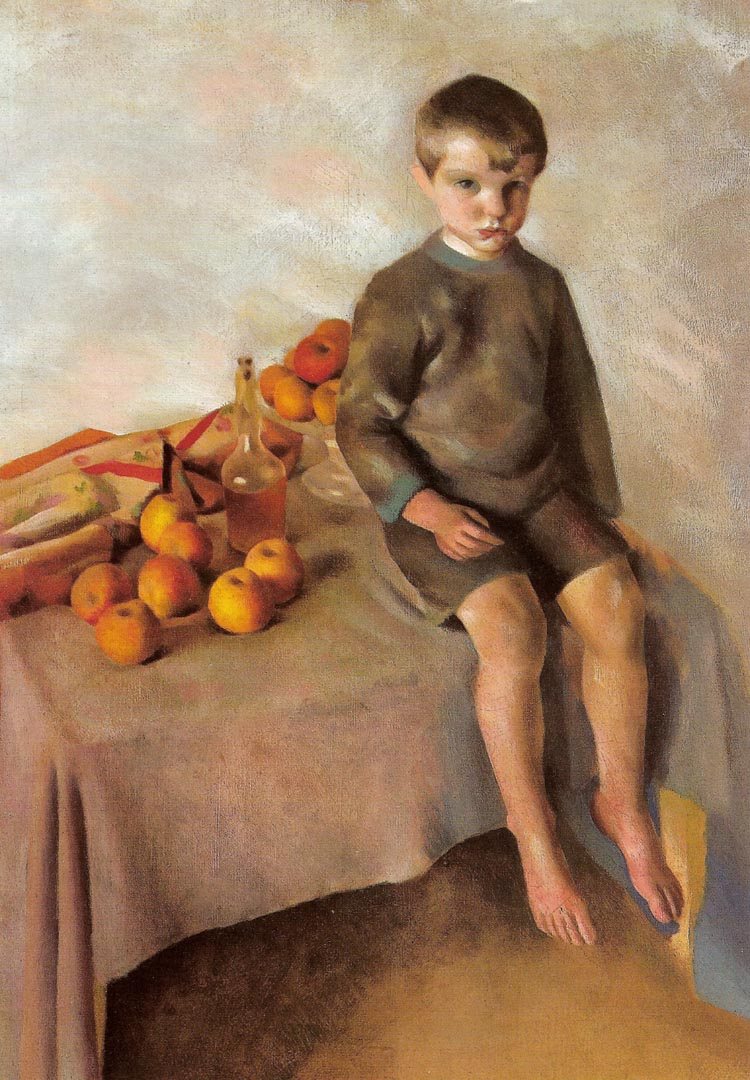
His son, Andrzej, with Apples
