= Jacek Sempoliński =

Polish painter, poet, and interior designer

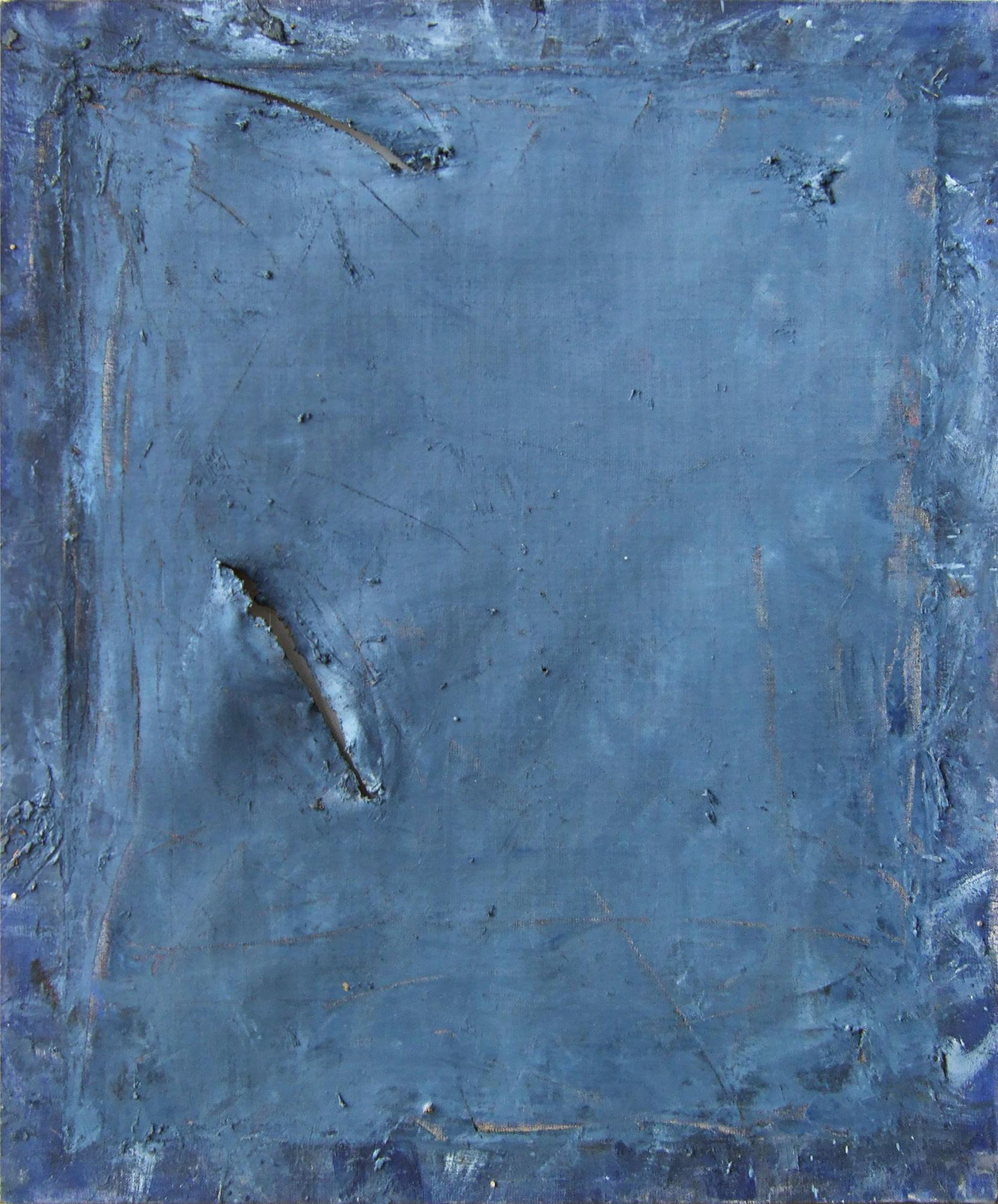
- Born: 27 March 1927; Warsaw, Poland
- Died: 30 August 2012; Warsaw, Poland
- Education: Academy of Fine Arts in Warsaw
- Known for: drawing, painting
- Movement: abstract expressionism
- Awards: Gloria Artis medal, Jan Cybis Prize, Kazimierz Ostrowski Award

Jacek Sempoliński (27 March 1927 – 30 August 2012) was a Polish painter, draftsman, art professor, critic, and essayist.

Sempoliński was born in Warsaw. He studied painting at the Academy of Fine Arts in Warsaw. He taught at his alma mater from 1956.

His works are held in the collections of Zachęta, Museum of Modern Art, Warsaw, BWA Bielsko Biała, Starak Family Foundation

== Selected exhibitions ==
- 2017 – Jacek Sempoliński, Gazing pictures, Manggha, Cracow
- 2002 – A me stesso, Zachęta, Warsaw
- 1995 – Jacek Sempoliński. Malarstwo, rysunek, Galeria Kordegarda, Warsaw
- 1983 – Jacek Sempoliński, Czaszka, Poznań Museum of Art

== Awards ==
- 1976 – Jan Cybis Prize, Warsaw
- 1986 – Brother Albert Award, Warsaw
- 2004 – The Kazimierz Ostrowski Award, Gdańsk
- 2012 – Gloria Artis (Zasłużony Kulturze – Gloria Artis) Medal, Warsaw
