= Jacek Waltoś =

Polish painter and sculptor (born 1938)

- Born: 5 December 1938 (age 87); Chorzów
- Citizenship: Polish
- Education: Jan Matejko Academy of Fine Arts
- Known for: painting, sculpture, graphic arts, drawing
- Awards: Jan Cybis Award (2002)

Jacek Romuald Waltoś (born 5 December 1938) is a painter, sculptor, graphic artist, draftsman, art critic and curator.

== Biography ==
The brother of Stanisław Waltoś.

He graduated from the Fine Arts High School in Kraków, and from 1952 to 1957 studied at the Faculty of Painting at the Academy of Fine Arts in Kraków, graduating under the supervision of Emil Krcha in 1963. From 1976 to 1979, he taught at his alma mater. Since 1979, he has lectured at the State Higher School of Fine Arts in Poznań (Academy of Fine Arts since 1996).

In 1966 he was a co-founder a member of the Grupa Wprost. He was the curator of several exhibitions, including, together with Marek Rostworowski, co-creator of the exhibition Romantyzm i romantyczność w sztuce polskiej XIX i XX wieku (Romanticism in Polish Art of the 19th and 20th Centuries, 1975). In the years 1975–1979 he ran the Pryzmat gallery in Kraków.

== Cycles of works ==
- Przemiany – Androgyne (Metamorphoses – Androgyne; 1962–1966)
- Kręgi (Circles; 1963–1966)
- Fedra wg. Jeana Racine'a (Phaedra after Jean Racine; 1968–1974)
- Pieta w trójnasób (Pietà in a Triple Way; 1976–1984)
- Pomiędzy nami – kres (Between Us – The End; 1978–1984)
- Eros-Agape (1980–1984)
- Płaszcz miłosiernego Samarytanina (The Cloak of the Good Samaritan; 1981–1988)
- Ludzie Czechowa (Chekhov's People; 1984–1991)
- Dr Freud bada duszę ludzką (Dr. Freud Explores the Human Soul; 1987–1992)
- Ofiarowanie I. przez A. (The Sacrifice of I. by A.; 1992–1997)
- Samuel i głos; Wołanie (Samuel and the Voice; The Calling; 1985–1999)
- Obrazy zdarzone (Occurring Images; 2000–2009)

Source.

== Books ==
- 100 najsłynniejszych obrazów. Co-authored with Andrzej Osęka.

== Awards ==
- Awards of the Independent Culture Committee "Solidarity" for the series of paintings "Coat of the Good Samaritan" (1984)
- Jan Cybis Award (2002)
- Knight's Cross of the Order of Polonia Restituta (2005)
- Award of the Minister of Culture and National Heritage (2006)
- Alba Romer-Taylor Award for Creativity in Sacred Art
