= Szymanów, Piaseczno County =

Szymanów
- Village
- Location within Poland
- Coordinates: 52°2′40″N 21°7′23″E
- Country: Poland
- Voivodeship: Masovian
- County: Piaseczno
- Gmina: Góra Kalwaria

Szymanów (Polish pronunciation: [ʂɨˈmanuf]) is a village in the administrative district of Gmina Góra Kalwaria, within Piaseczno County, Masovian Voivodeship, in east-central Poland.
