= Jerzy Nowosielski =

Polish artist (1923–2011)

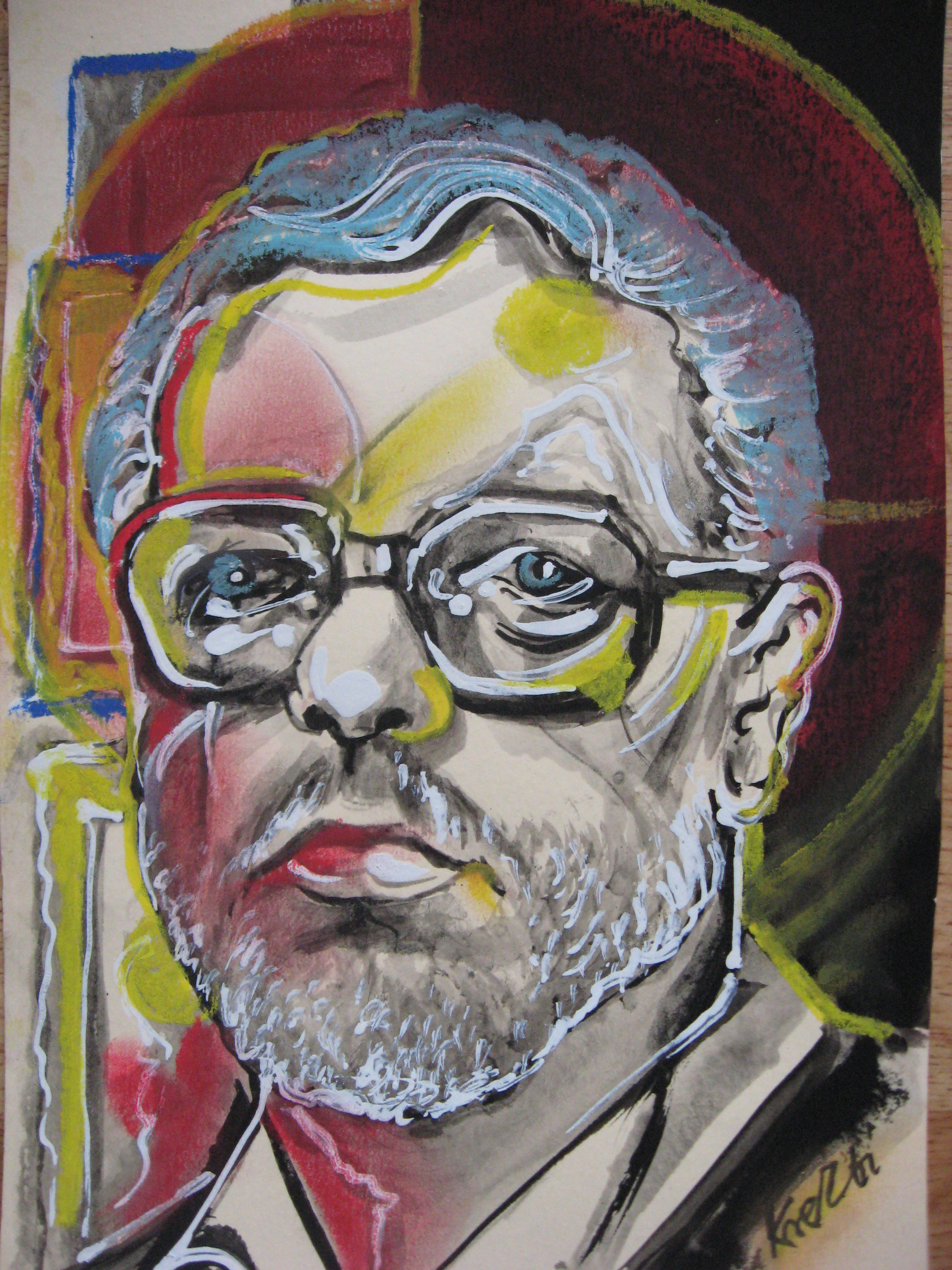
- Nowosielski by Zbigniew Kresowaty
- Born: January 7, 1923; Kraków, Poland
- Died: February 21, 2011 (aged 88); Kraków, Poland
- Known for: Painting

Jerzy Nowosielski (Polish: [ˈjɛʐɨ nɔvɔˈɕɛlskʲi]; born 7 January 1923 – died 21 February 2011) was a Polish painter, graphic artist, scenographer, illustrator and Eastern Orthodox theologian. He is regarded among the greatest contemporary Polish icon painters.

== Life and career ==
He was born in Kraków. His father was a Lemko of Greek Catholic Rite and came from Odrzechowa in the Sanok district, his mother Anna Harnlender was a Pole with German roots.

He was well known for his religious compositions (wall paintings, iconostases, polychromies) in the Eastern Orthodox Churches in Kraków, Białystok, and Jelenia Góra, the Roman Catholic Church of the Holy Cross at Wesoła, the Franciscan Church in the Azory district of Kraków, and the Ukrainian Catholic Church in Lourdes, France. Nowosielski designed and erected the Ukrainian Catholic Church of the Birth of the Blessed Virgin Mary in Biały Bór.

He also painted portraits, landscapes, still lifes, and abstract pictures. His works are found in Polish museums and in private collections in Canada, the US, and Germany. In 1988 he received Jan Cybis Award. In 1993, he received the Commander's Cross of the Order of Polonia Restituta and was also awarded a prize by the Polish cultural foundation Wielka Fundacja Kultury. In 2000, he received an honorary doctorate from the Jagiellonian University. In 2008, he was awarded the Gold Medal for Merit to Culture – Gloria Artis.

In 2022, a unique ceramic mosaic depicting St Francis of Assisi by Nowosielski created in 1980 was discovered in the Warsaw district of Izabelin and added in 2023 to the register of cultural property due to its artistic and historic significance.

== Remembrance ==
In 2023, on the 100th anniversary of Nowosielski's birth, the Polish Parliament declared 2023 as the Year of Jerzy Nowosielski to celebrate the artist and his legacy. In December 2023, he was the central figure of the exhibition "The Art of Seeing: Nowosielski and Others" organized at the Royal Castle in Warsaw.

== Gallery ==
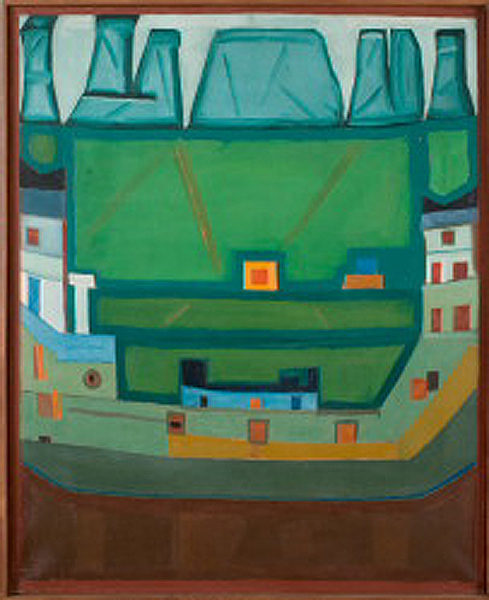
Town at the Foot of Mountains (1963)

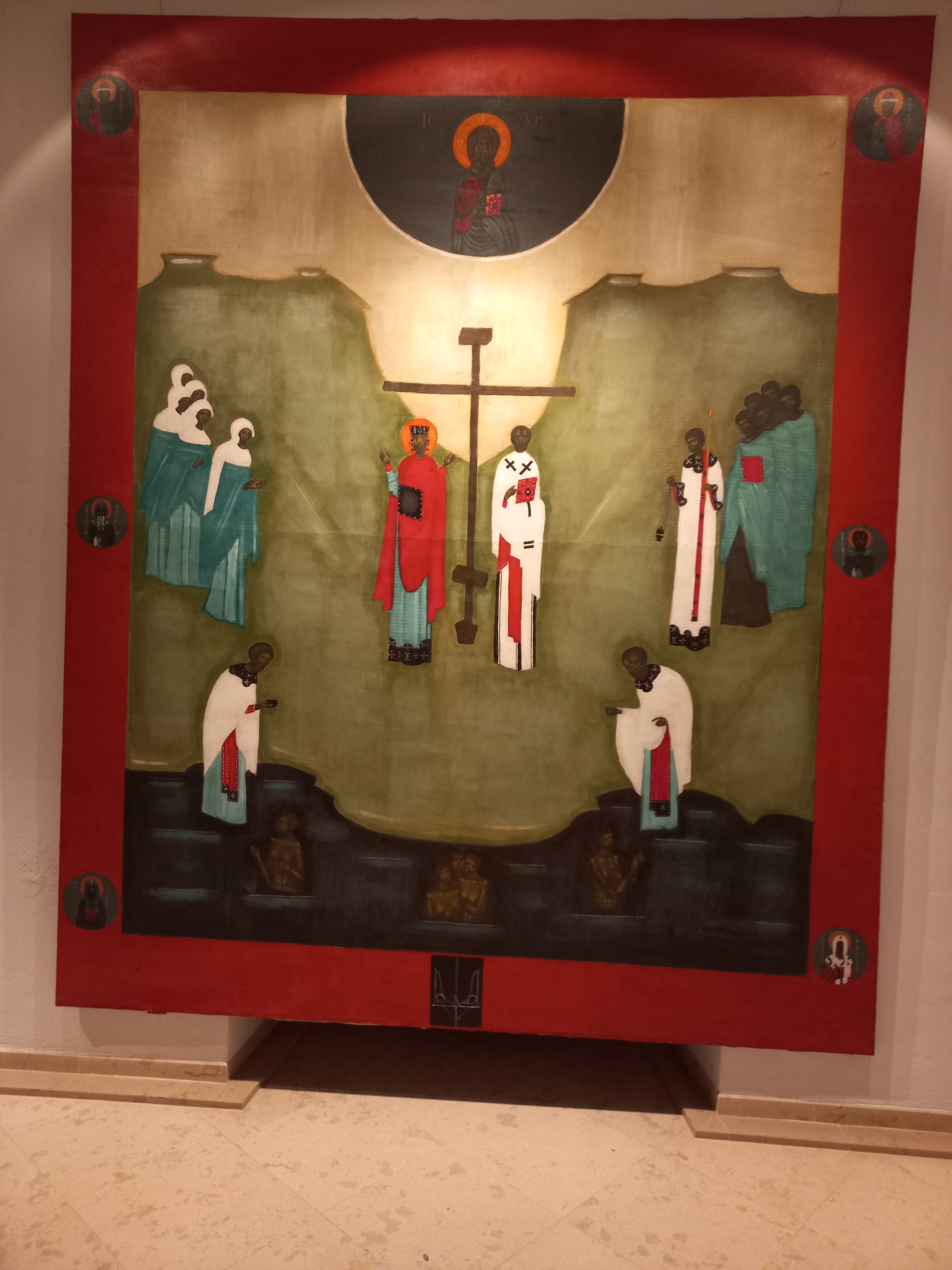

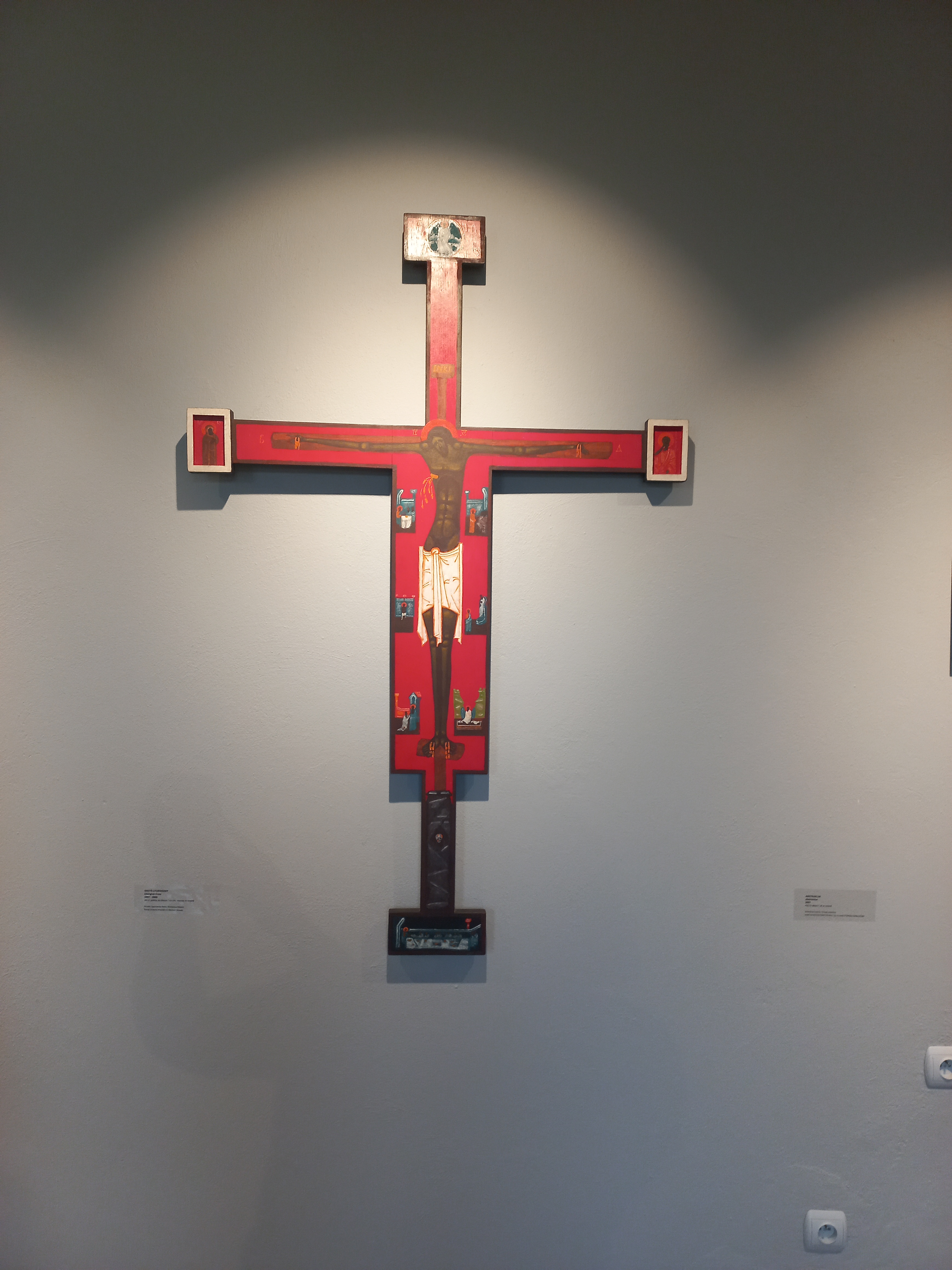

== See also ==
- List of Polish painters
- List of Polish artists
