= Association of Polish Artists and Designers =

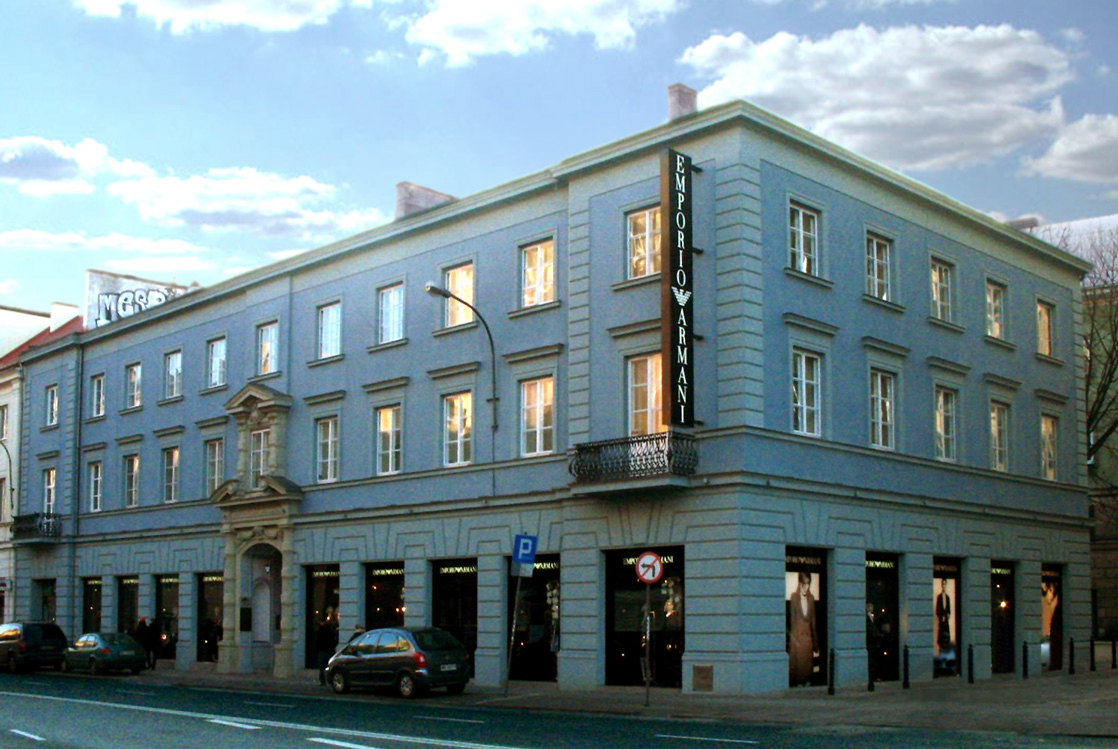
- ZPAP main office in Warsaw
- Abbreviation: ZPAP
- Type: NGO; Copyright collective
- Headquarters: Warsaw, kamienica Efrosa at ul. Nowy Świat 7
- Coordinates: 52°14′30″N 21°00′56″E
- Official language: Polish
- Website: www.zpap.pl

The Association of Polish Artists and Designers (Związek Polskich Artystów Plastyków, ZPAP) is an official association of professional artists in Poland. It represents more than 4,500 learned artists working in the field of visual arts, including: painting, sculpture, graphic design, interior and set design, ceramics, fabric arts, as well as new media, and art restoration.

The Association was founded in 1911 in Kraków during the Partitions of Poland. In the interwar period until 1939 it served as a trade union and in 1945, following World War II, it was formally re-established as an association. In 1980, ZPAP supported the Solidarity movement and opposed the imposition of martial law in 1981. Consequently, the military authorities disbanded the Association when it refused to retract its communiqués. ZPAP operated unofficially until the restoration of democracy in 1989. Today, ZPAP features prominently across the country with 23 regional Chapters, paid staff, curators, publications, and regional art galleries promoting work of its members.

== Structure ==
ZPAP membership is limited to graduates of art faculties of relevant institutions of higher learning, with the main emphasis on regional Academies of Fine Arts. On top of its creative presence in major Polish cities, the Association operates two professional development retreats, in Ustka and in Świnoujście. It sponsors dozens of commercial art galleries across Poland as well as selected stores with professional art supplies. ZPAP organizes a number of annual events, and offers its own Jan Cybis Award for creative achievement. In 1996 the Association organized the UNESCO conference around the international status of an artist. It is the leading advocacy group working in conjunction with the Polish governmental agencies regulating labor laws applicable to practising art professionals. ZPAP is represented in the World Executive Committee of the International Association of Art (IAA).

Since 1995, ZPAP has been designated a copyright collective and has managed copyrights of about 1,000 members and has been in charge of issuing licenses for the commercial use of their artwork. In 2019, ZPAP lost its permit for collective copyright management. The economic nonprofit activity of the Association is geared toward generating funds necessary for the maintaining of its venues, as well as providing financial support for members in need.

The main office of ZPAP is in Warsaw and is located at the upper floor of the historic kamienica Efrosa at ul. Nowy Świat 7 (pictured), where Princes of the Lubomirski family once lived in the 18th century. The building was rebuilt with its original Baroque portal intact following wartime destruction of the Polish capital.

Regional chapters of ZPAP are located in the following cities: Białystok, Bielsko-Biała, Bydgoszcz, Częstochowa, Gdańsk, Katowice, Kielce, Koszalin, Kraków, Lublin, Łódź, Olsztyn, Opole, Poznań, Radom, Rzeszów, Szczecin, Toruń, Warsaw, Wrocław, Zakopane, Zielona Góra, and Gliwice.
