= Zuzanna Janin =

Polish artist

- Born: Warsaw, Warsaw Voivodeship, Polish People's Republic
- Died: 1961 (age 64–65)
- Education: Warsaw Academy of Fine Arts
- Known for: Video artist, installation artist
- Awards: The Best Artist Art Vilnius'16

Zuzanna Janin (née Antoszkiewicz, born 1961) is a Polish visual artist and former teen actor. Janin lives and works in Warsaw and London. Janin has created sculpture, video, installation, photography and performatives. She used the names Zuzanna Baranowska (1990-1992) and from 1992 Zuzanna Janin. Her work was shown in the Museum of Contemporary Art in Chicago and the A.I.R. Gallery in New York City. She is included in Feminist Artists Data in the Brooklyn Museum, NYC.

== Career ==
Janin is a visual artist, and participated in numerous shows in Europe and worldwide (in 1990-1992 under the name Zuzanna Baranowska, and from 1992 under the name Zuzanna Janin) i.e. Pompidou Metz, Jeu de Paume Paris, Art Institute Chicago, Museum of Contemporary Art Chicago, Whitechapel London, Moderna Museet Stockholm, Hoffmann Sammlung Berlin, Galerie Progr Bern, Hamburger Bahnhof Berlin, Kunsthalle Bern, Kunstmuseum Bern, The Art Institute of Philadelphia, SALM National Gallery Prague, Tate Exchange / Tate Modern London, TOP Tokyo Photographic Art Museum, NOMUS National Gallery Gdańsk, and many other institutions, museums and galleries. She took part in Sonbeek'92, Sydney Biennale 1992-1993, Istanbul Biennal 1992, Liverpool Biennale 1996, and 54th Venice Art Biennale 2011 (Romanian programme)., Manifesta 14, Priszina 2022 and A.I.R Gallery New York 2022.

Janin had a solo presentation and screening at Kunstverein Salzburg; National Gallery Zacheta Warsaw; Foksal Gallery Warsaw; Center for Contemporary Art Warsaw; Kunsthalle Wien Project Space; Momentum Berlin, Sculpture Museum at Królikarnia National Museum Warsaw; Museum of Modern Art Warsaw; National Museum Cracow; lokal_30 Warsaw; Galeria Federico Bianchi Milano; A.v.Scholz Galerie Berlin; Galeria Labirynt Lublin, City Gallery Gdańsk, ASAB Bogota/Colombia; MAM Museu de Arte Moderna Rio de Janeiro; MODEM Debrecen; Foksal Gallery Warsaw, RazemPomoja Gallery Cracow.

Her work includes the sculpture of cotton candy "Sweet Girl, Sweet Boy", an installation made out of car models "Dreaming of Speed & Adventure", the video installation "All that Music!" made of 6 simultaneous HD videos showing teenagers playing at home or the video-performance "Fight", which portrays her fighting a never-ending-box-mach with a Polish heavy-weight world champion. The work is included i.e. in the Collection of National Museum Cracow, Sammlung Hoffmann Berlin.

In 2005, until 2012, Zuzanna Janin opened her studio in Warsaw for exhibition and event creating together with art historian and curator Agnieszka Rayzacher independent space in Warsaw called lokal_30. In 2012 lokal_30 changed the location into bigger space and is now operating as contemporary art gallery lokal_30, directed by Agnieszka Rayzacher.

In 2009-2010, Janin started working on the first series of video installations Majka from the Movie. The video series is composed of non-narrative episodes based on the 1970s Polish television series Szaleństwo Majki Skowron (Madness of Majka Skowron). Majka, a teenage girl vagabonds through a kaleidoscope of cinema and television frames from the 70s till present. Majka from the Movie is in the collections i.e. MAM Rio, National Museum Warsaw, Museum of Modern Art Warsaw, Hoffmann Sammlung Berlin.

In 2014-2018 she have done series of sculptures dealing with the problems of today, f.ex. violence, xenophobia, refugees problem and planet destruction: SHAME, Cyber-Violence, In Bed with M. Sleeping Blue, Red from Shame, Black Like Me(selfies), ROOMS and sculptures Anthropocene from epoxy resin.

In 2022, she presented her performance, which scenario she wrote in 2018 and then performed in several galleries: "ROOMS. A Story of a Certain Betrayal" in her triptych video installation at the main scene of the TR theater in Warsaw (artistic director Grzegorz Jerzyna, cooparation Roman Pawłowski).

She was nominated to the prize Paszporty Polityki in 1999, 2000, 2001 for her solo shows at CCA Warsaw, Foksal Gallery Warsaw and Zacheta National Gallery Warsaw. She was awarded the prize of "The Best Artist" on Art Vilnius'16 for her solo show "Volvo 240 Transformed into 4 Drones" on special shows presentation. Her sculpture presented in a public space Home Transformed into Sphere was shown in the Open City Festival awarded "The Best Event of 2017". In 2018 she was awarded by WO (Wysokie Obcasy weekly) among "50 Bold Women 2018" (for her honest interview on art and domestic violence).

Janin has collaborated with a numerous artists and writers including Olga Tokarczuk who wrote a text for her first catalogue.

== Film career ==
Janin was a teen actress, playing the title role of Majka Skowron in a Polish TV serial Szalenstwo Majki Skowron (Madness of Majka Skowron) created in 1976.

She played Natalia Rosińska Siłaczka in a Polish film on "SIŁACZKi / Strong Women" (2018) directed by Marta Dzido and Piotr Śliwowski, about the history of the first Polish Feminists fighting for Women's Right in 1918 in Poland.

== Private life ==
Janin's mother who survived Auschwitz, was famous Polish painter Maria Anto. Zuzanna Janin's husbands were: Paweł Baranowski (1982-1990) and Mirosław Bałka (1990-2018). Her children are: Mel Baranowska and Ignacy Bałka.

From 2018 the artist has been a member of SURWIWALKI / SURVIVORS, a group of women who experienced domestic violence, established at the Women's Rights Center in Warsaw.
