= Jerzy Mierzejewski =

Polish painter

- Born: 13 July 1917; Kraków, Poland
- Died: 14 June 2012 (aged 94); Warsaw, Poland
- Resting place: Powązki Cemetery
- Known for: Painting, Drawing, Ceramics.
- Movement: Cubism
- Spouse: Krystyna Sznerr-Mierzejewska (1923–1994)
- Awards: Jan Cybis Award (1997)

Jerzy Mierzejewski (13 July 1917 – 14 June 2012) was a Polish painter, pedagogue and long-term dean of Cinematography and Directing at the Łódź fim school. He was the son of Jacek Mierzejewski, and brother of Andrzej Mierzejewski, both also painters.

== Awards ==
- Jan Cybis Award (1997)
- Honorary Doctorate Honoris-Causa of the Łódź fim school (2006)
