= List of ambassadors of Poland to Ireland =

Poland Ambassador to Ireland
- Ambasador Rzeczypospolitej Polskiej w Irlandii

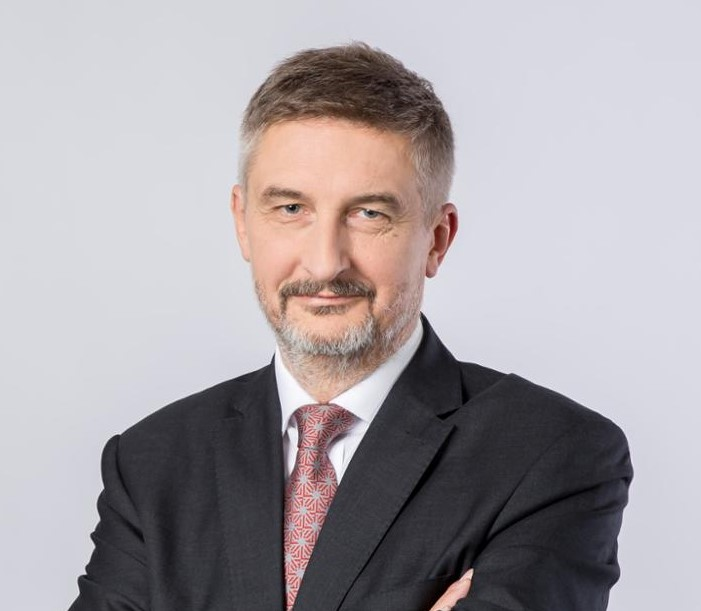
- Incumbent; Artur Michalski (Chargé d'affaires) since 2024
- Reports to: Polish Ministry of Foreign Affairs
- Seat: Dublin, Ireland
- Appointer: President of Poland
- Term length: No fixed term
- Website: Embassy of Poland, Dublin

The Republic of Poland Ambassador to Ireland is the ambassador extraordinary and plenipotentiary from the Republic of Poland to Ireland. The current ambassador is Artur Michalski.

The main embassy building is located in Ballsbridge, affluent neighbourhood in the City of Dublin. The ambassador's residence is located on the same street as embassy building. The Consular and Polish Diaspora Section of the embassy is located in the centre of Dublin, on the Eden Quay, next to the O'Connell Bridge.

== History ==
Before Second World War Poland did not establish diplomatic relations with Ireland. First diplomatic relations between the two countries were established in 1976, however until 1991, Poland Ambassador to Ireland was not residing in Ireland. The Embassy of Poland in Dublin was opened in 1991.

== List of ambassadors of Poland to Ireland ==
=== Polish People's Republic ===
- 1977–1979: Stanisław Pichla (Poland Ambassador to Denmark, accredited to Ireland)
- 1979–1981: Jerzy Feliksiak (Poland Ambassador to Belgium, accredited to Ireland)
- 1981–1984: Alojzy Bartoszek (Poland Ambassador to Netherlands, accredited to Ireland)
- 1984–1987: Stefan Staniszewski (Poland Ambassador to the United Kingdom, accredited to Ireland)
- 1987–1990: Zbigniew Gertych (Poland Ambassador to the United Kingdom, accredited to Ireland)

=== Third Polish Republic ===
- 1990–1991: Tadeusz de Virion (Poland Ambassador to the United Kingdom, accredited to Ireland)
- 1991–1995: Ernest Bryll
- 1995–1996: Marek Grela (chargé d’affaires)
- 1996–1997: Stanisław Szymański
- 1997–2002: Janusz Skolimowski
- 2002–2006: Witold Sobków
- 2006–2010: Tadeusz Szumowski
- 2010–2015: Marcin Nawrot
- 2015–2018: Ryszard Sarkowicz
- 2018–2019: Łukasz Chimiak (chargé d’affaires)
- 2019–2023: Anna Sochańska
- 2023–2024: Arkady Rzegocki
- since 2024: Artur Michalski (chargé d’affaires)
