= List of ambassadors of Poland to the United Nations =

Ambassador of Poland to the United Nations
- Ambasador Rzeczypospolitej Polskiej przy ONZ
- Coat of arms of Poland

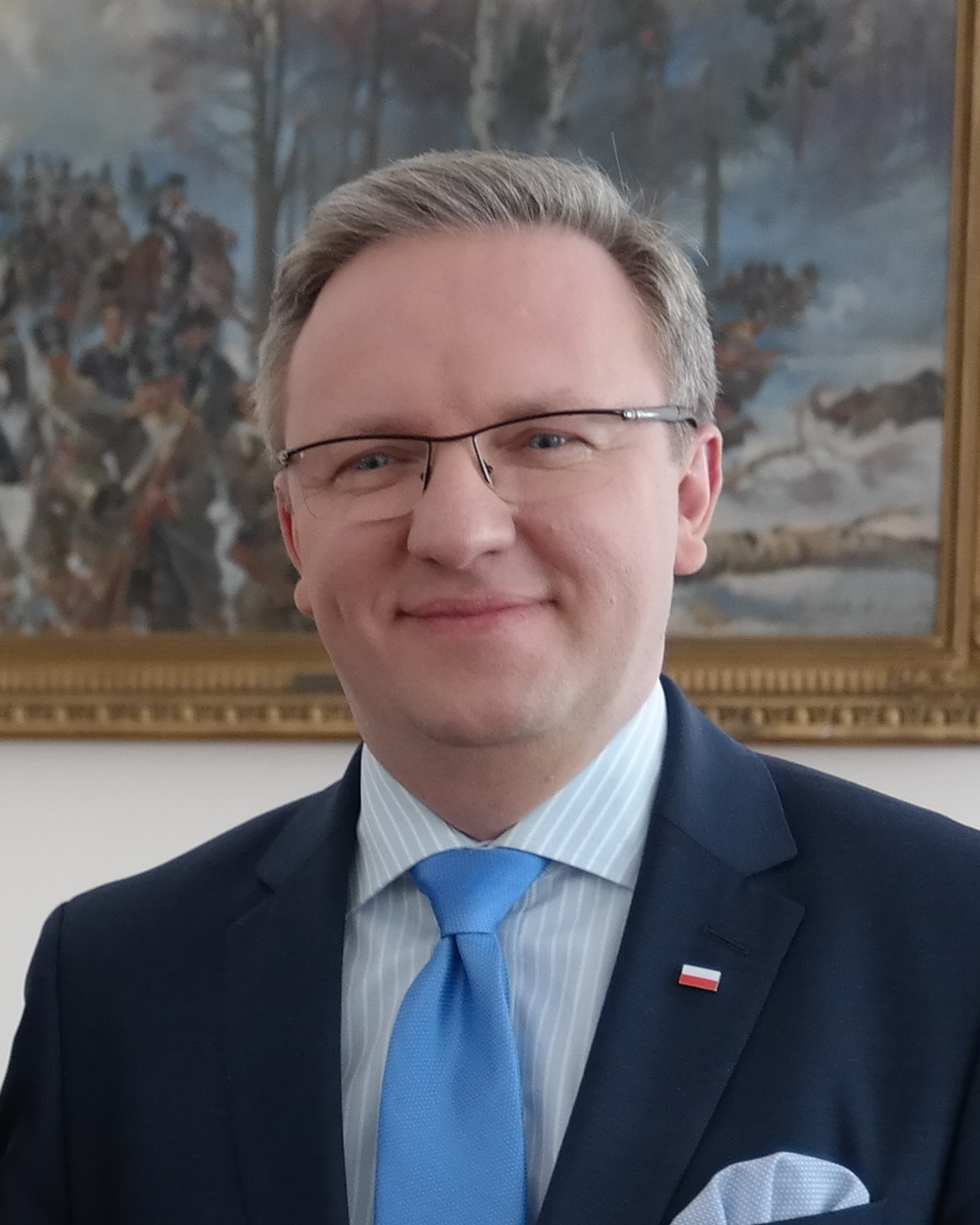
- Incumbent; Krzysztof Szczerski since August 18, 2021
- Style: Mr. Ambassador (informal); His Excellency (diplomatic)
- Seat: 750 Third Avenue, 30th Floor New York, NY 10017 United Nations
- Appointer: President of Poland
- Term length: No fixed term
- Formation: 1947
- First holder: Juliusz Katz-Suchy
- Website: Permanent Mission of the Republic of Poland to the United Nations in New York

The Poland ambassador to the United Nations is the leader of the Poland delegation, Poland Mission to the United Nations. The position is formally known as the permanent representative of Poland to the United Nations, with the rank and status of ambassador extraordinary and plenipotentiary.

As with all Poland Ambassadors, the ambassador to the UN is nominated by the President of Poland and confirmed by the Parliamentary Commission of the Foreign Affairs. The ambassador serves at the pleasure of the president, and enjoys full diplomatic immunity.

The current ambassador is Krzysztof Szczerski, who was nominated by President Andrzej Duda in 2021.

== List of Ambassadors ==
#	Portrait	Ambassador	Years served	Poland Head of State	Ref.
1		Juliusz Katz-Suchy	1947-1951	President Bolesław Bierut	
2		Henryk Birecki	1951-1956	Chairman of the Council of State Bolesław Bierut Chairman of the Council of State Aleksander Zawadzki	
3		Jerzy Michałowski	1956-1960	Chairman of the Council of State Aleksander Zawadzki	
4		Bohdan Lewandowski	1960-1966	Chairman of the Council of State Aleksander Zawadzki Chairman of the Council of State Edward Ochab	
5		Bohdan Tomorowicz	1966-1968	Chairman of the Council of State Edward Ochab	
6		Eugeniusz Kułaga	1969-1975	Chairman of the Council of State Marian Spychalski Chairman of the Council of State Józef Cyrankiewicz Chairman of the Council of State Henryk Jabłoński	
7		Henryk Jaroszek	1975-1980	Chairman of the Council of State Henryk Jabłoński	
8		Ryszard Frelek	1980-1981	Chairman of the Council of State Henryk Jabłoński	
9		Eugeniusz Wyzner	1981-1982	Chairman of the Council of State Henryk Jabłoński	
10		Włodzimierz Natorf	1982-1985	Chairman of the Council of State Henryk Jabłoński	
11		Eugeniusz Noworyta	1985-1989	Chairman of the Council of State Wojciech Jaruzelski	
12		Stanisław Pawlak	1989-1991	President Wojciech Jaruzelski President Lech Wałęsa	
13		Robert Mroziewicz	1991-1992	President Lech Wałęsa	
14		Zbigniew Włosowicz	1993-1997	President Lech Wałęsa President Aleksander Kwaśniewski	
15		Eugeniusz Wyzner	1998-1999	President Aleksander Kwaśniewski	
16		Janusz Stańczyk	2000-2004	President Aleksander Kwaśniewski	
17		Andrzej Towpik	2004-2010	President Aleksander Kwaśniewski President Lech Kaczyński	
18		Witold Sobków	2010-2012	President Bronisław Komorowski	
19		Ryszard Sarkowicz	2012-2014	President Bronisław Komorowski	
20		Bogusław Winid	2014-2017	President Bronisław Komorowski President Andrzej Duda	
21		Joanna Wronecka	2017-2021	President Andrzej Duda	
22		Krzysztof Szczerski	2021-present	President Andrzej Duda President Karol Nawrocki	
