= Włosowicz =

Włosowicz is a Polish surname. Notable people with the surname include:

- Jacek Włosowicz (born 1966), Polish politician
- Zbigniew Włosowicz (born 1955), Polish politician
