= National Museum in Kraków =

Museum in Kraków, Poland

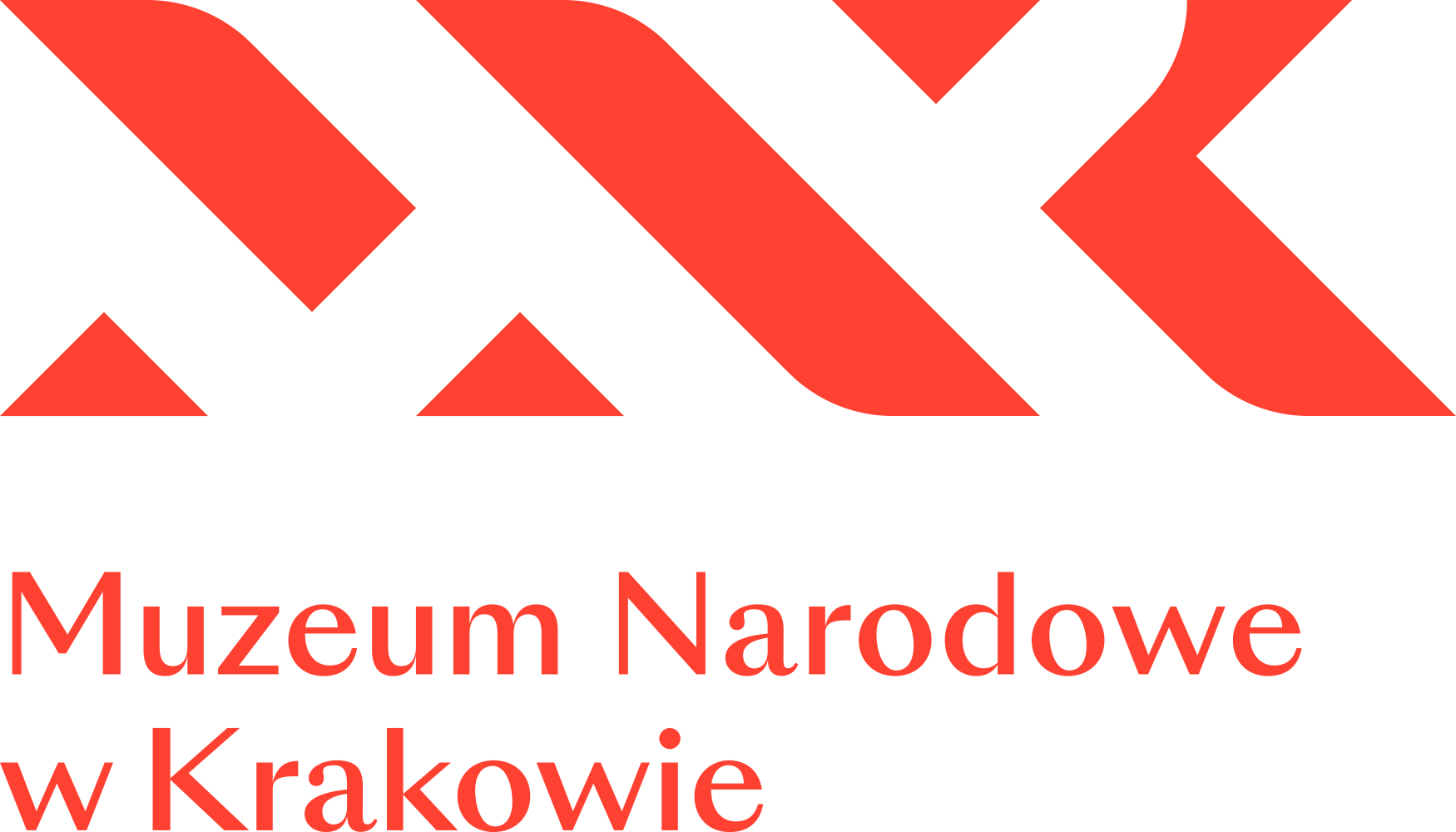

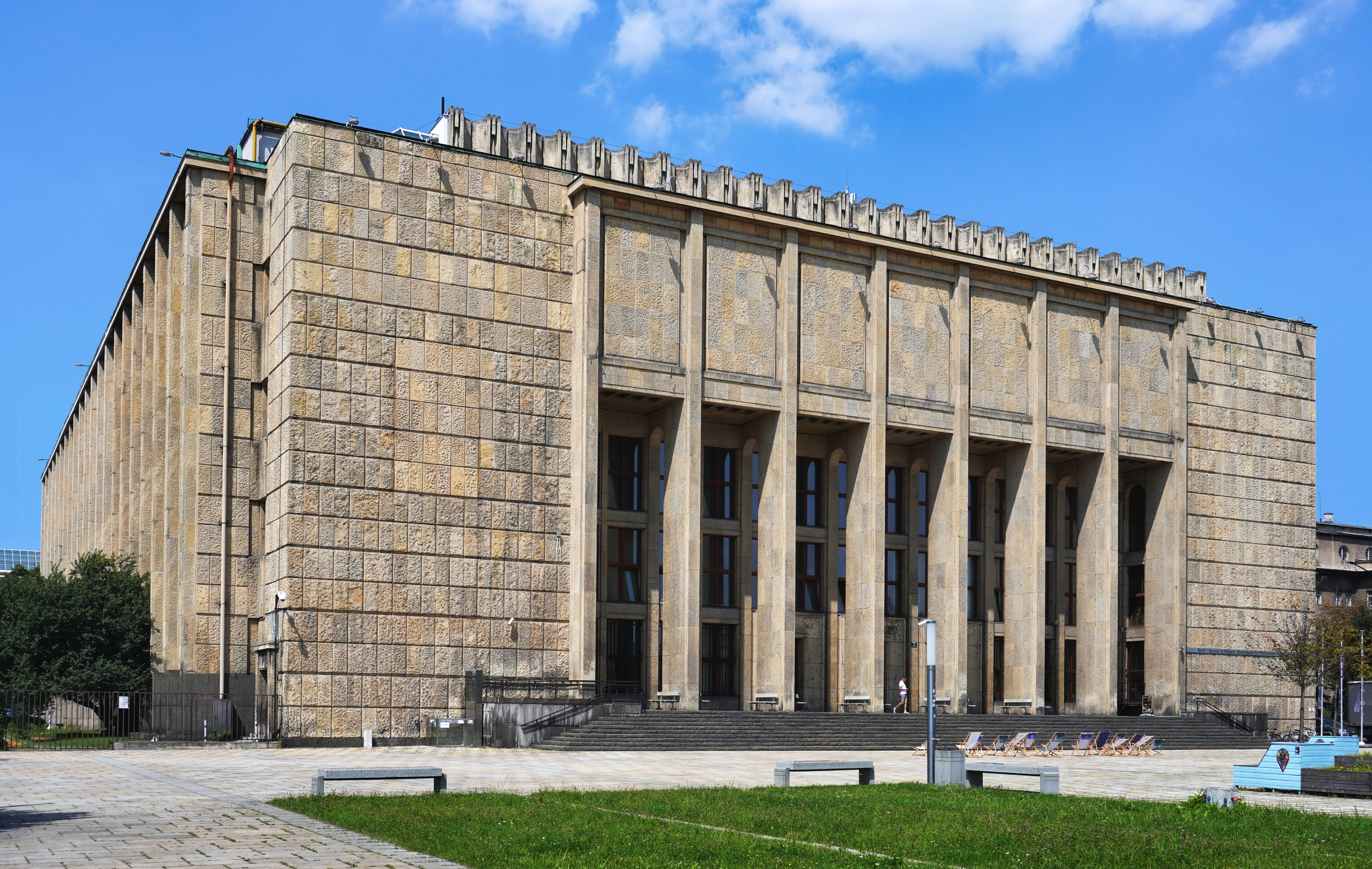
- Main building
- Interactive fullscreen map
- Established: 7 October 1879
- Location: 3 Third of May Avenue; Kraków, Poland
- Coordinates: 50°03′37″N 19°55′26″E
- Type: National museum
- Director: Andrzej Szczerski
- Website: mnk.pl

The National Museum in Kraków (Polish: Muzeum Narodowe w Krakowie), popularly abbreviated as MNK, is the largest museum in Poland. Established in 1879, the museum consists of 21 departments which are divided by art period: 11 galleries, 2 libraries, and 12 conservation workshops. It holds some 780,000 art objects, from classical archeology to modern art, with special focus on Polish painting. In 2023, the museum was visited by over 1.85 million people, making it the third most-visited art museum in Poland and the 38th most-visited art museum in the world.

== Location ==
The Kraków National Museum was first housed at the upper floor of the Renaissance Sukiennice building located at the Main Square in the Kraków Old Town, now home to one of its most popular divisions in the city. The construction of the museum's contemporary New Main Building located at 3 Maja Street, started in 1934, but was interrupted by World War II. It was fully completed only in 1992, after the collapse of the Eastern Bloc. The collections – consisting of several hundred thousand items in total – are kept in big part in the Main Building where the administrative offices are located, but also in the nine of its divisions around the city.

During World War II the collection was looted by the German occupation forces. After the war the Polish Government retrieved many of the works seized by the Germans. Still more than 1,000 artifacts are missing, including the 16th-century Pieter Bruegel the Elder painting The Fight Between Carnival and Lent (which Polish authorities allege was stolen in 1939 by German invaders, reportedly taken away and sold in Vienna, and currently resides in the Kunsthistorisches Museum there). It was donated to the museum in 1937 by Stanisław Ursyn-Rusiecki.

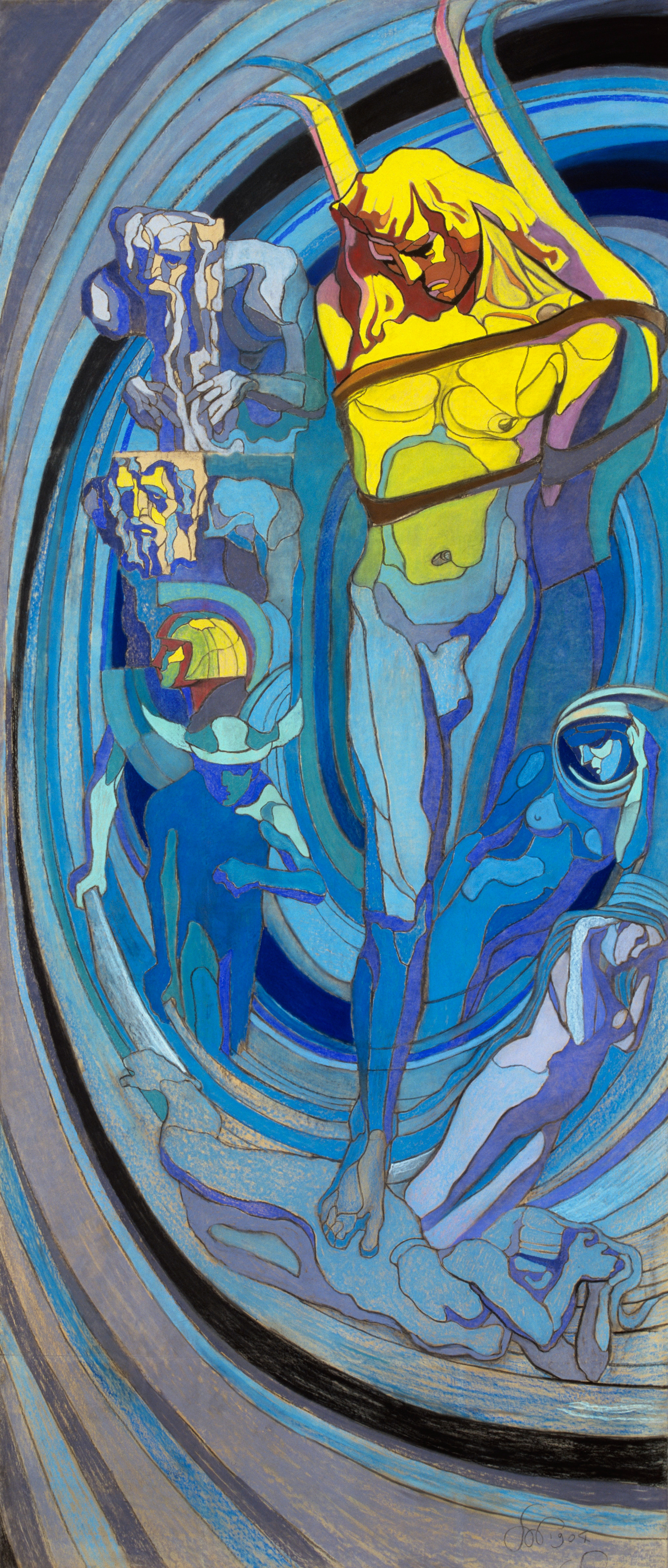
Apollo - Copernicus solar system by Stanisław Wyspiański, 1904

== Collections ==
The Main Building features the newly renovated upper Gallery of the Twentieth Century Polish Art, one of the largest galleries of painting and sculpture from the late 19th century on in Poland, with most celebrated artwork by Jacek Malczewski, Leon Wyczółkowski, Włodzimierz Tetmajer; an extensive collection of works by Stanisław Wyspiański; and also, works by artists of the interwar and postwar periods: the Polish cubists, expressionists, colorists, the avant-garde of the 1930s, and representatives of New Directions from the 1960s.

Paintings in the collection include masterpieces of the Young Poland movement (Konrad Krzyżanowski, Olga Boznańska, Józef Pankiewicz, Władysław Ślewiński, Wacław Szymanowski, Ludwik Puget, Jan Stanisławski, Tadeusz Makowski). Polish avant-garde is represented by Zbigniew Pronaszko, Leon Chwistek, Tytus Czyżewski, Stanisław Osostowicz, Eugeniusz Waniek, Jan Cybis, Hanna Rudzka-Cybisowa, Artur Nacht-Samborski, Jan Szancenbach, Józef Czapski, Piotr Potworowski, Wacław Taranczewski, Juliusz Joniak.

The collection of post-war art includes works by Tadeusz Kantor, Jonasz Stern, Maria Jarema, Jerzy Nowosielski, Andrzej Wróblewski, Katarzyna Kobro, Alina Szapocznikow, Maria Pinińska-Bereś, Katarzyna Kozyra. It also holds works by a wide range of influential contemporary Polish artists including Grzegorz Sztwiertnia, Rafał Bujnowski, Wilhelm Sasnal, Jadwiga Sawicka, Leon Tarasewicz, Stanisław Rodziński, Jan Pamuła, and Jan Tarasin.

=== Militaria ===
The arsenal building has a vast display of militaria ranging from 12th to 20th century, including Polish armor from 16th and 17th centuries, Polish sabers, firearms, saddles and caparisons, military uniforms from 18th to 20th century, military orders, medals, and distinctions. The museum holdings also include a collection of Western and Eastern European weapons. The militaria are presented at the "Arms and Colours" exhibition.

=== Decorative arts ===
Decorative arts and crafts are exhibited in the Decorative Arts and Crafts Gallery, with gold, silver and precious stone artifacts ranging from twelfth to eighteenth century; copper, pewter and iron objects, such as bowls and wrought iron chests; old furniture, musical instruments, clocks, ceramics and glass, notably stained glass from the churches of Kraków. The museum has one of Poland's largest collections of Polish and Oriental antique rugs and carpets, as well as a collection of sixteenth to twentieth century costumes.

== Museum Divisions ==
1. The Main Building, at 3 Maja St., featuring nearly 500 works by Poland's leading modern artists.
2. Gallery of the 19th Century Polish Art in Sukiennice, with the collection of some of the best known paintings of the Young Poland Movement, including sculpture.
3. Czartoryski Museum, with world-famous for Leonardo's painting of Lady with an Ermine. The museum has other old masters on display including dramatic landscapes by Rembrandt.
4. Czartoryski Library, with illuminated medieval and early modern manuscripts.
5. Bishop Erazm Ciołek Palace with polish gothic, renaissance and baroque art
6. Stanisław Wyspiański Museum
7. Jan Matejko House on Floriańska Street
8. Józef Mehoffer House - artist's house
9. Szołayski's House - temporary exhibitions
10. Emeryk Hutten-Czapski Museum - numismatic collection
11. Karol Szymanowski Museum at Villa Atma in Zakopane
12. Cracovia Hotel - in Kraków

In 2009 a new project "Museum Forum" was launched to promote art in front of National Museum's Main Building. The winning design from architect Michal Bernasik was than chosen.

== Gallery ==
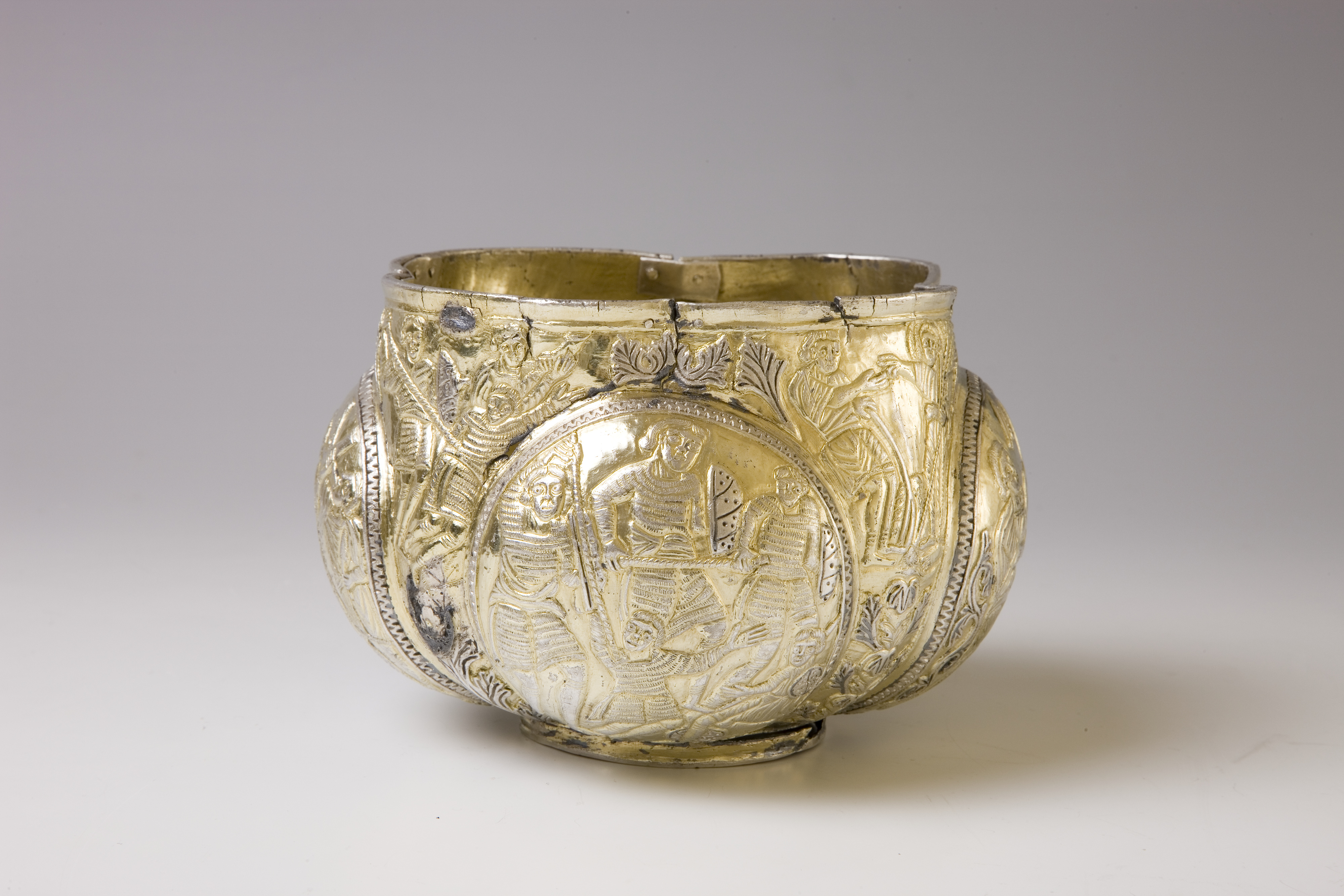
The Włocławek Goblet, 10th century

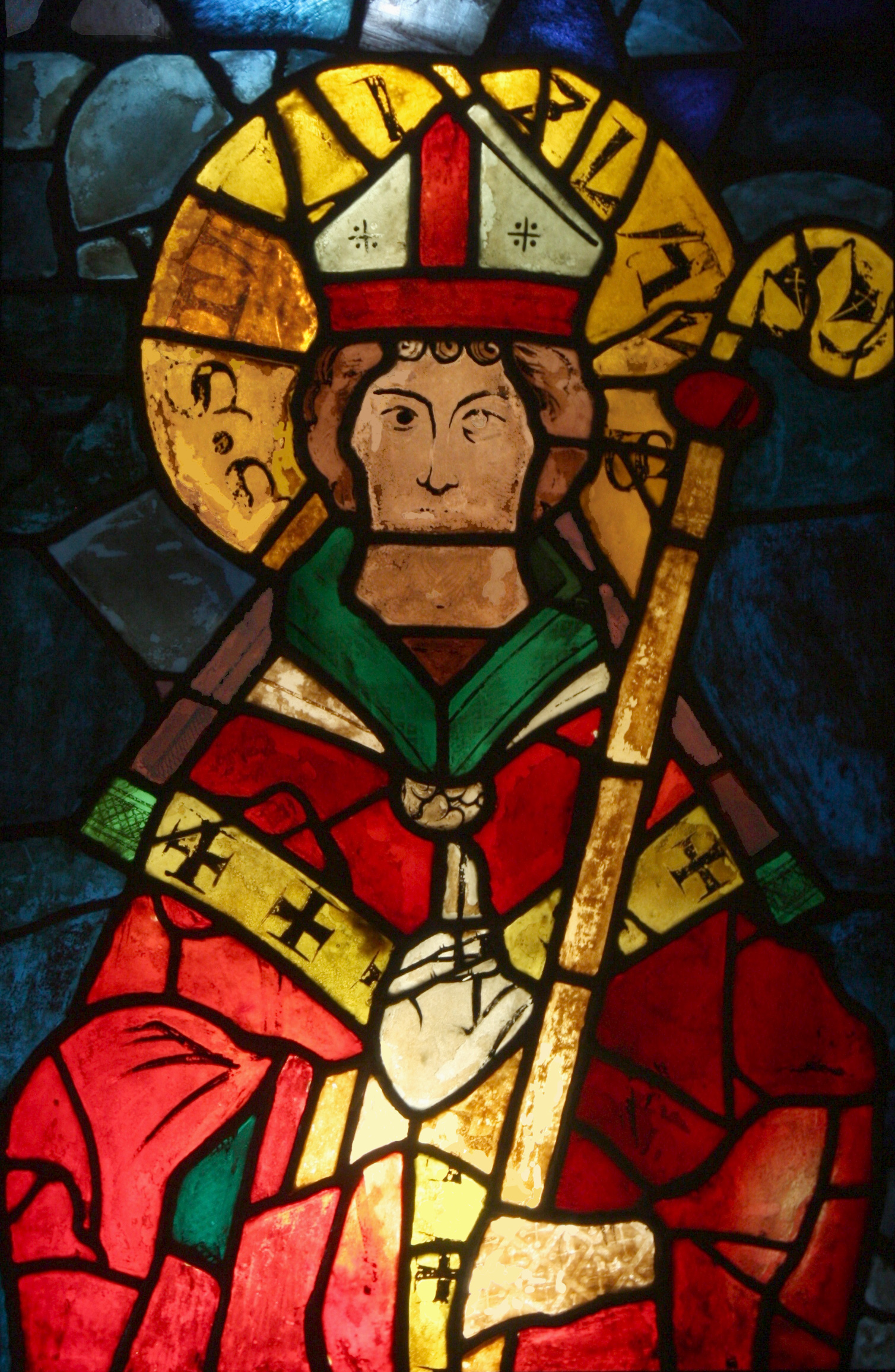
St Stanislaus. Gothic stained-glass window from Dominican Monastery in Kraków

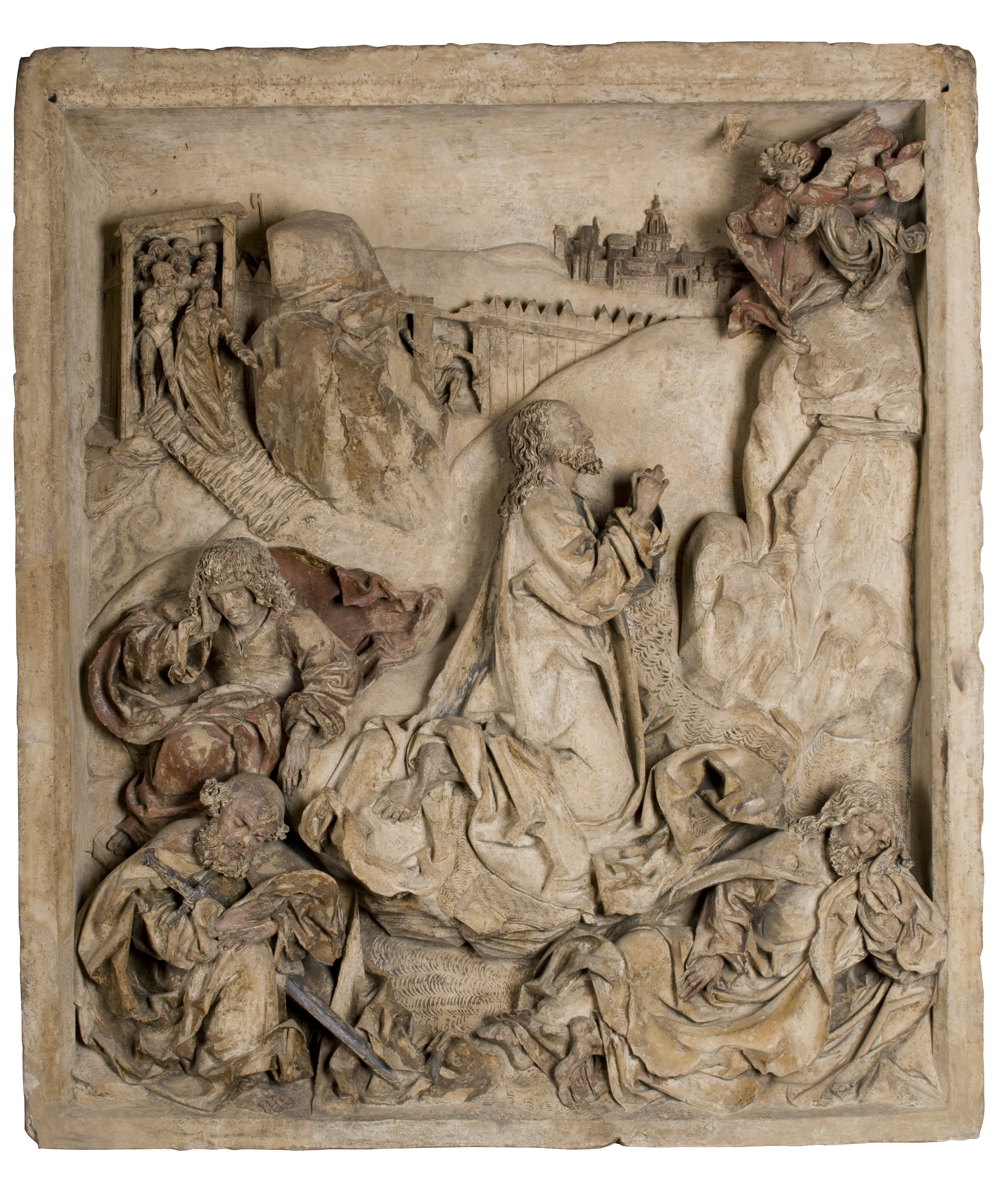
Christ in the Garden of Gethsemane, bas-relief by Veit Stoss, ca. 1485

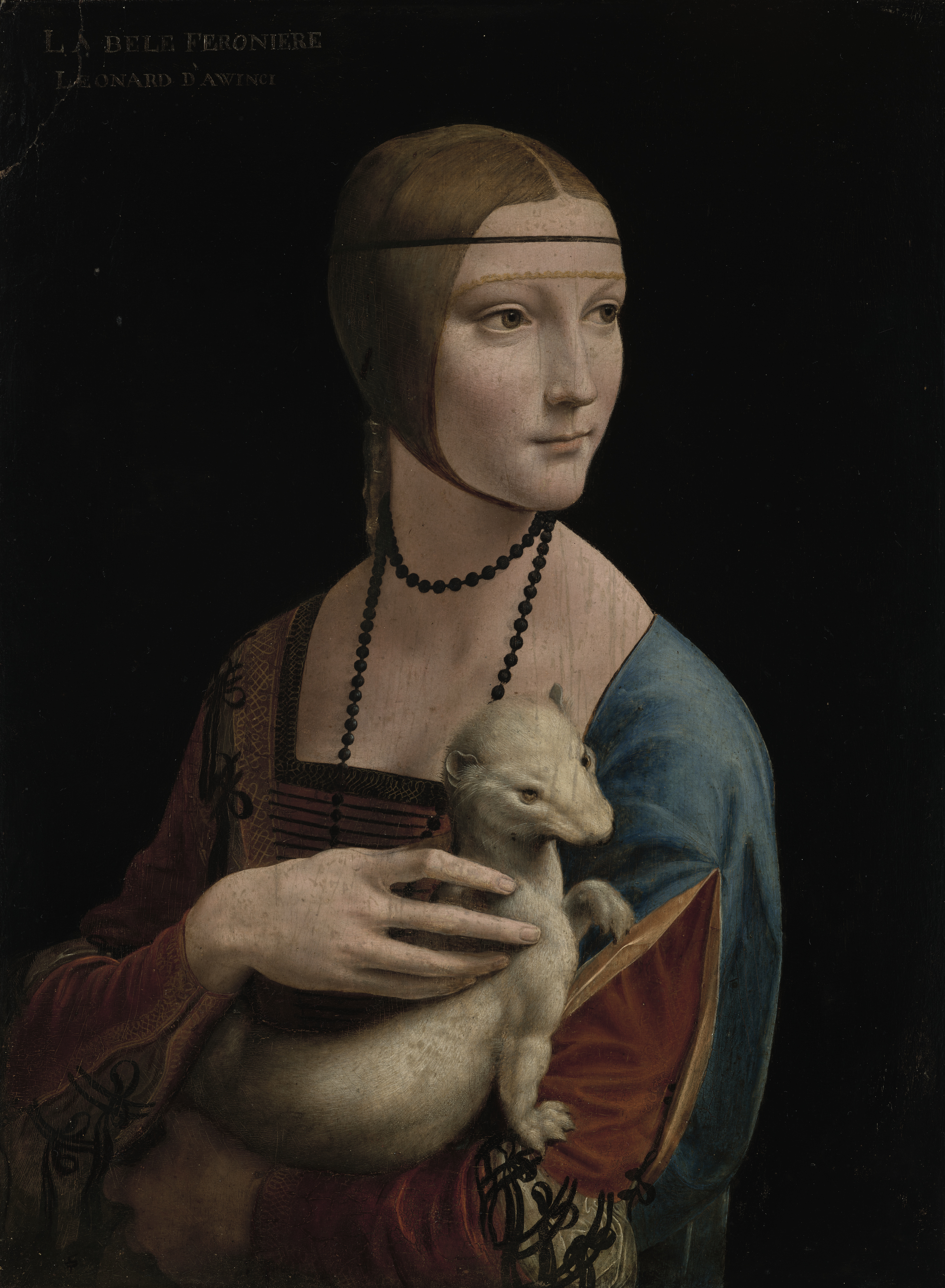
Lady with an Ermine, Leonardo da Vinci, c. 1490

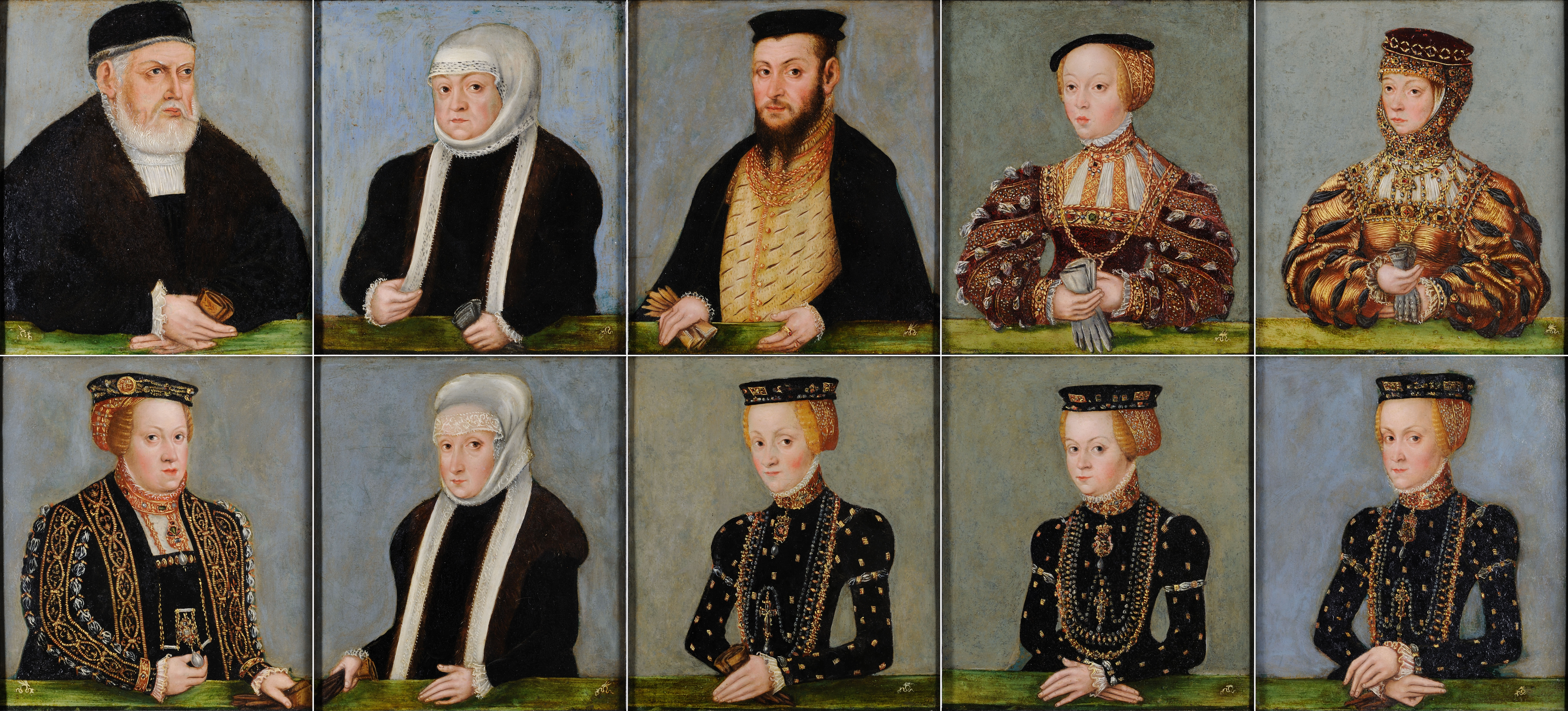
The Family of Sigismund I of Poland, Lucas Cranach the Younger, c. 1553-1555

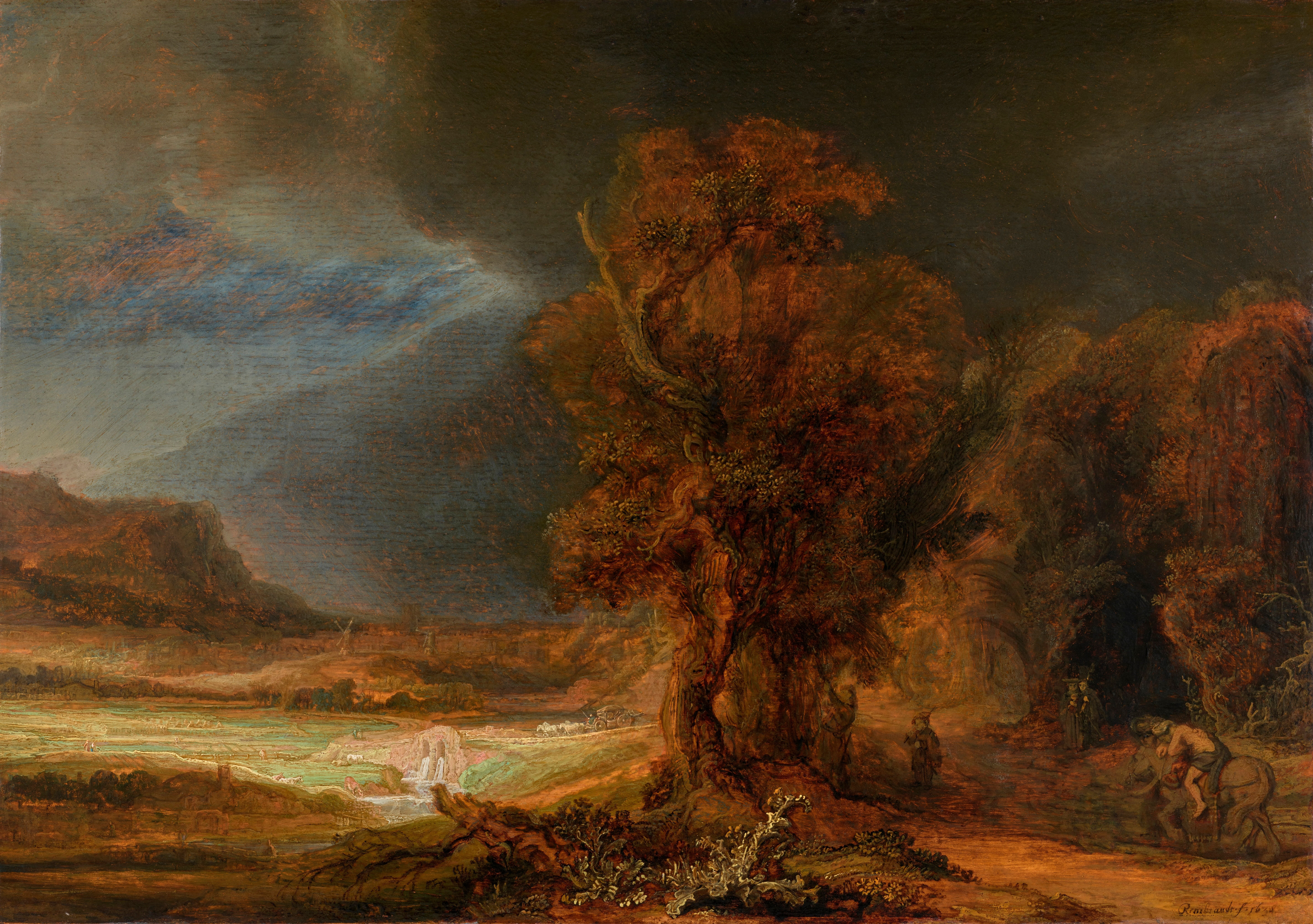
Landscape with the Good Samaritan, Rembrandt, 1638

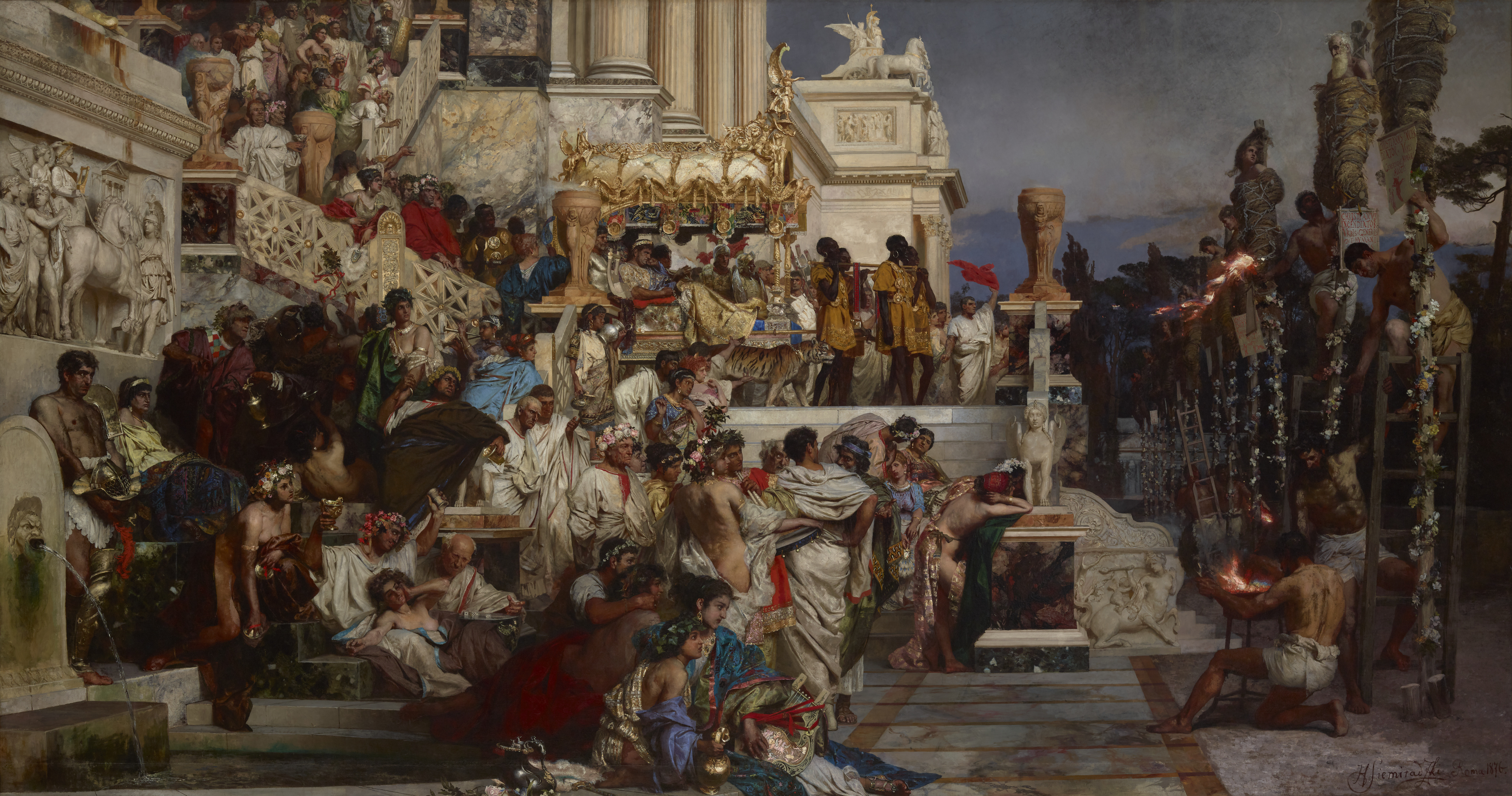
Nero's Torches, Henryk Siemiradzki, 1876

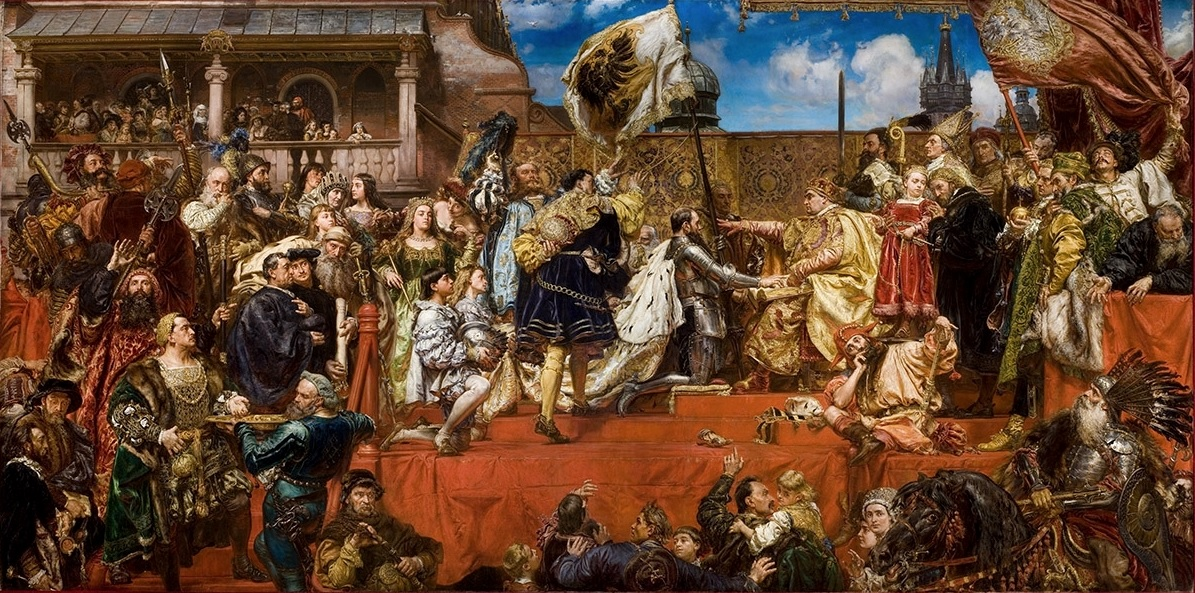
Prussian Homage, Jan Matejko, 1879–1882

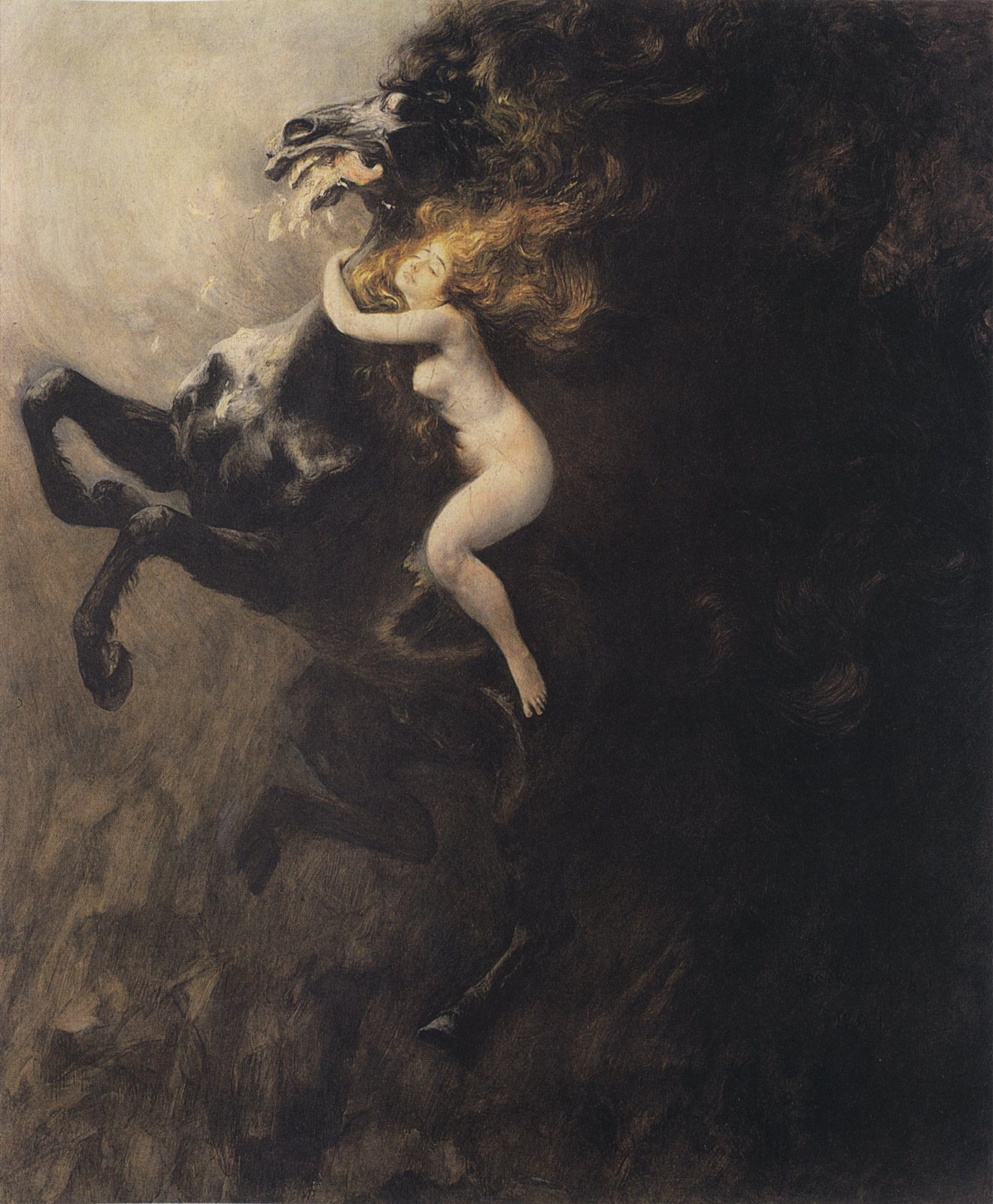
Frenzy of Exultations, Władysław Podkowiński, 1893

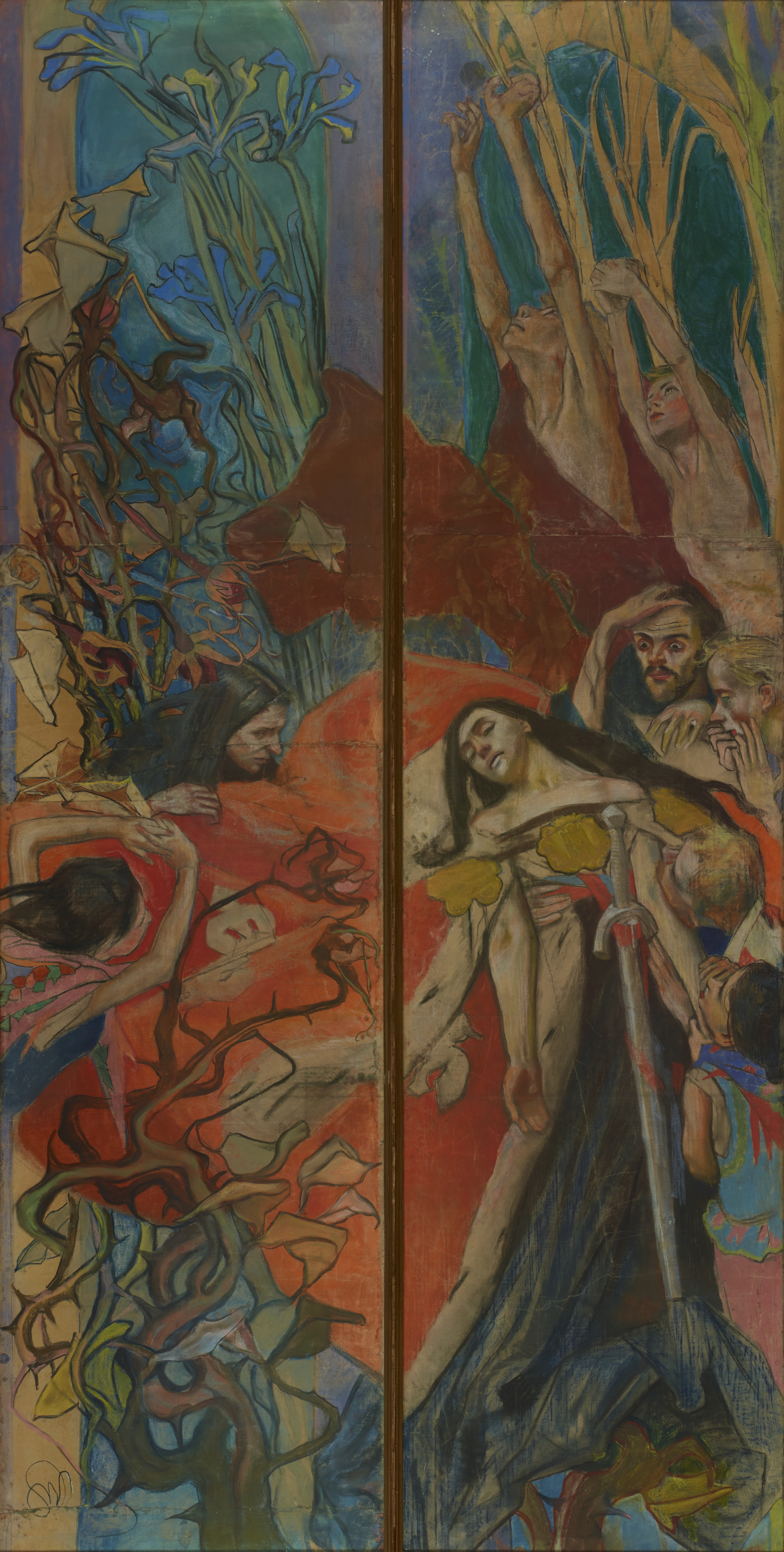
Polonia, Stanisław Wyspiański, 1893-1894

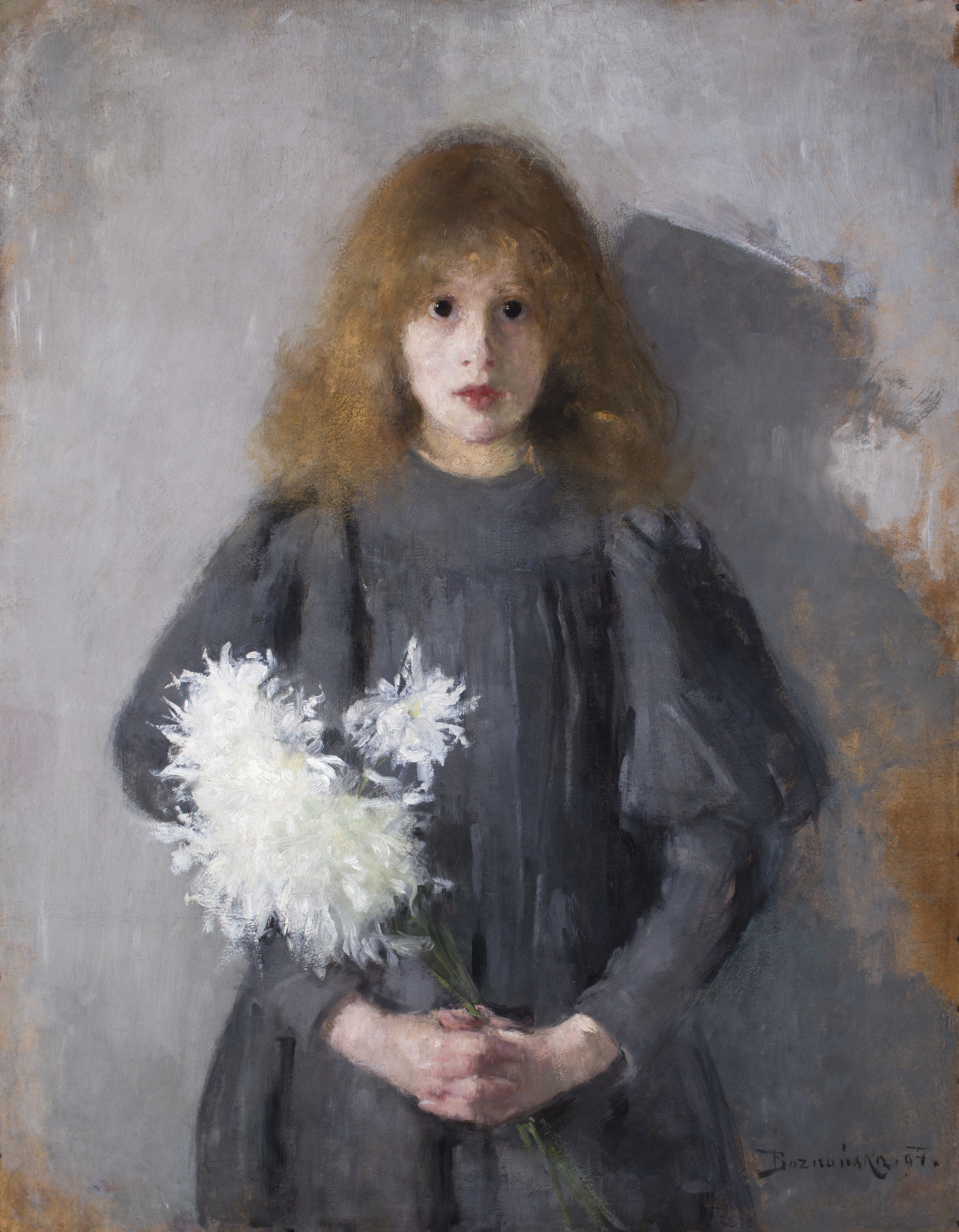
Girl with Chrysanthemums, Olga Boznańska, 1894

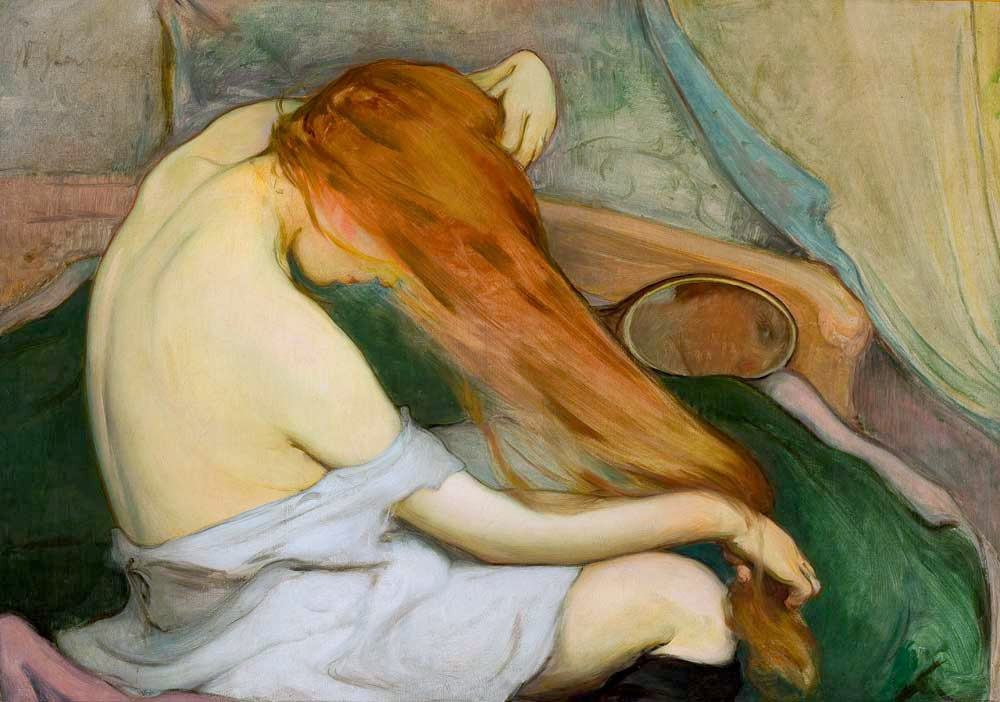
Woman Combing Hair, Władysław Ślewiński, 1897

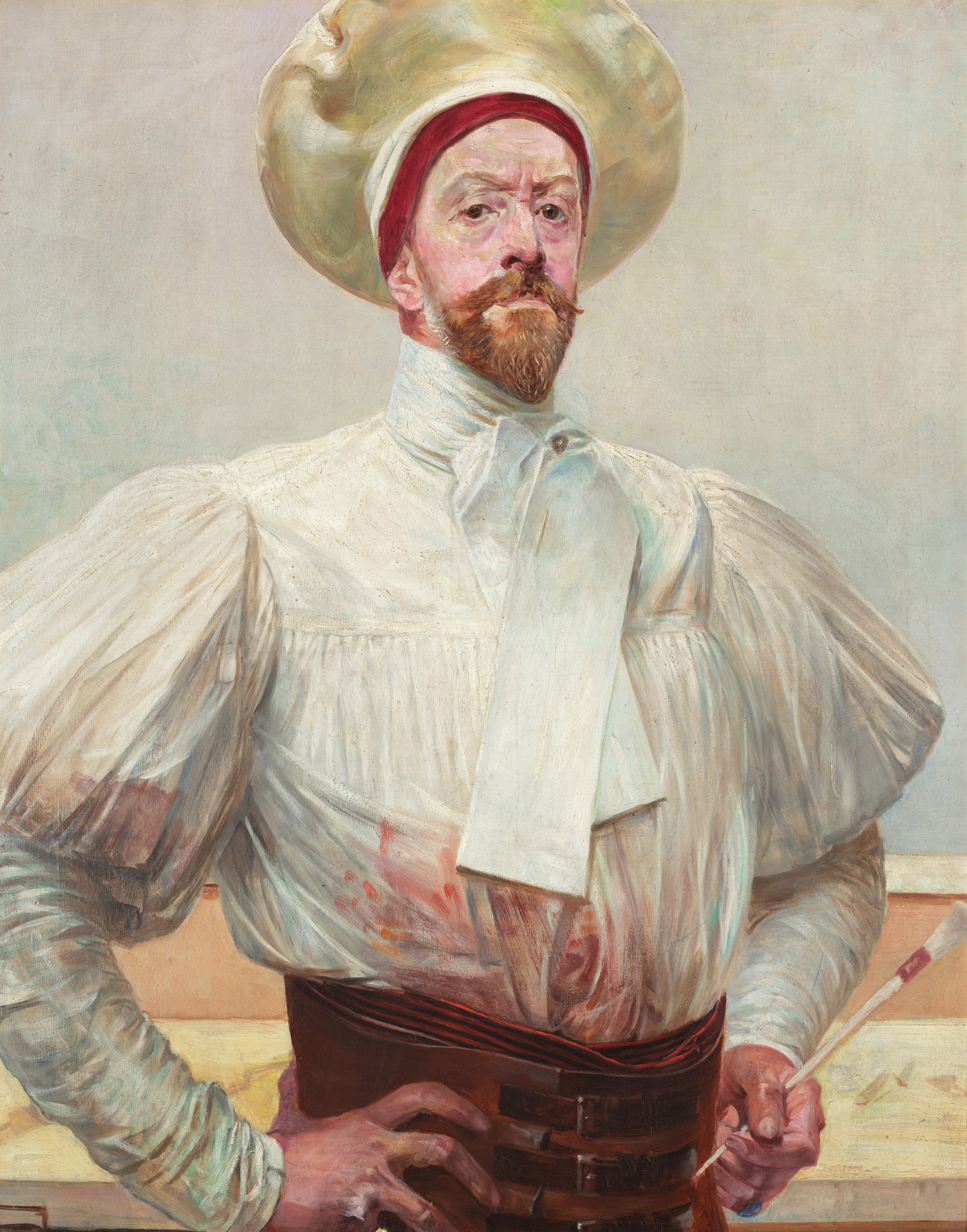
Self-Portrait in a White Attire, Jacek Malczewski, 1914

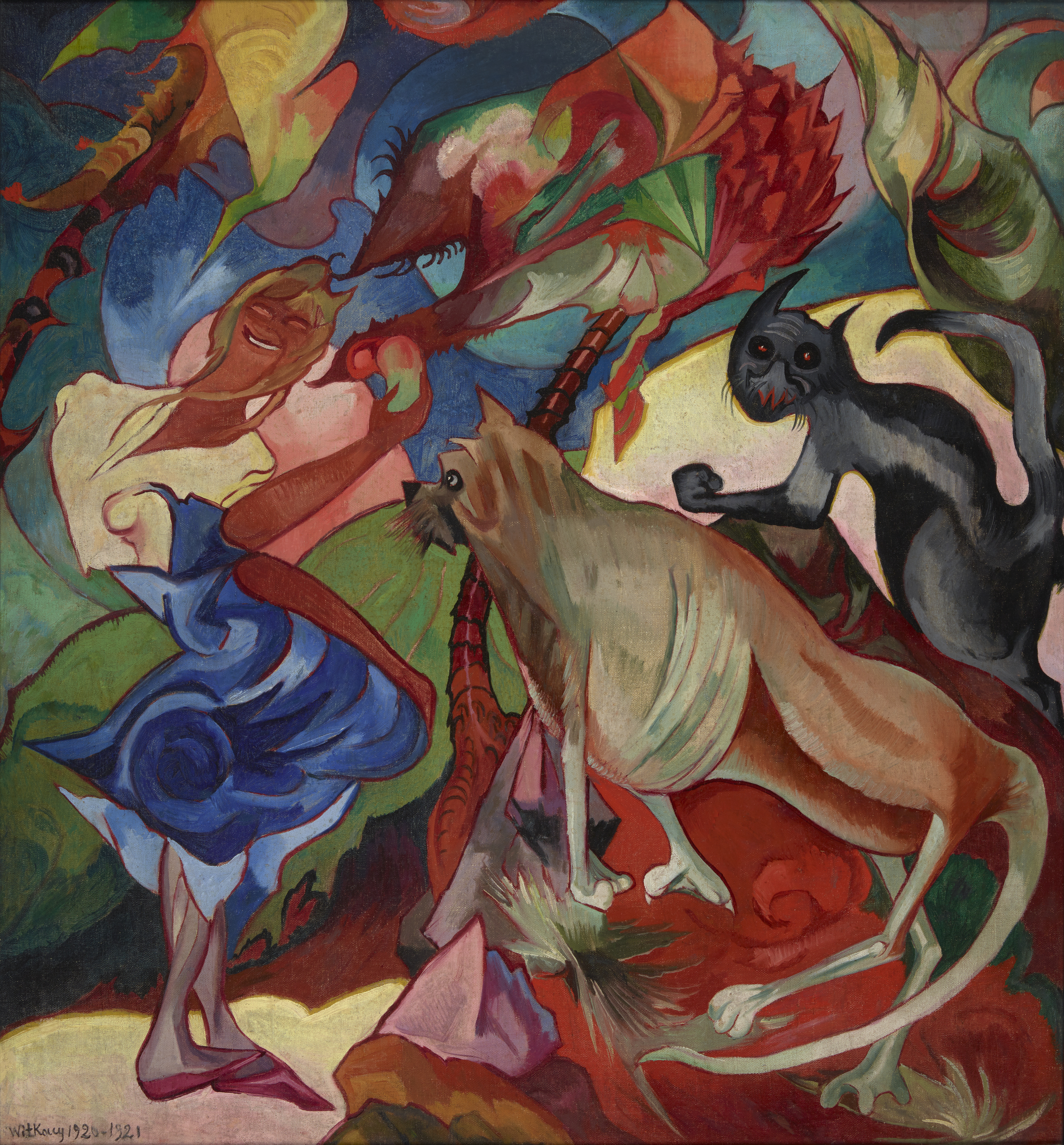
Marysia with the Dog Burek on Ceylon, Stanisław Ignacy Witkiewicz, 1920-1921

== Wartime losses ==
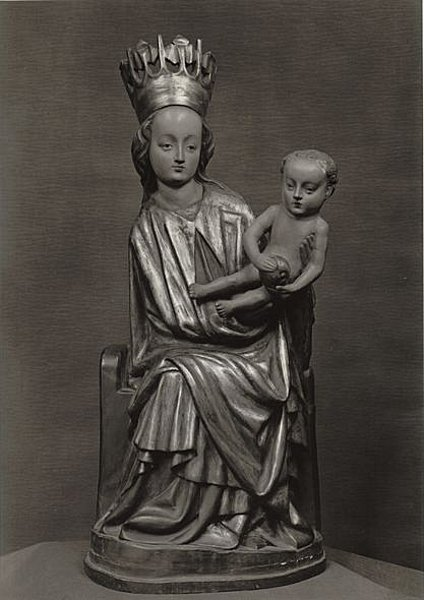
Throning Madonna of Rabka, Lesser Poland

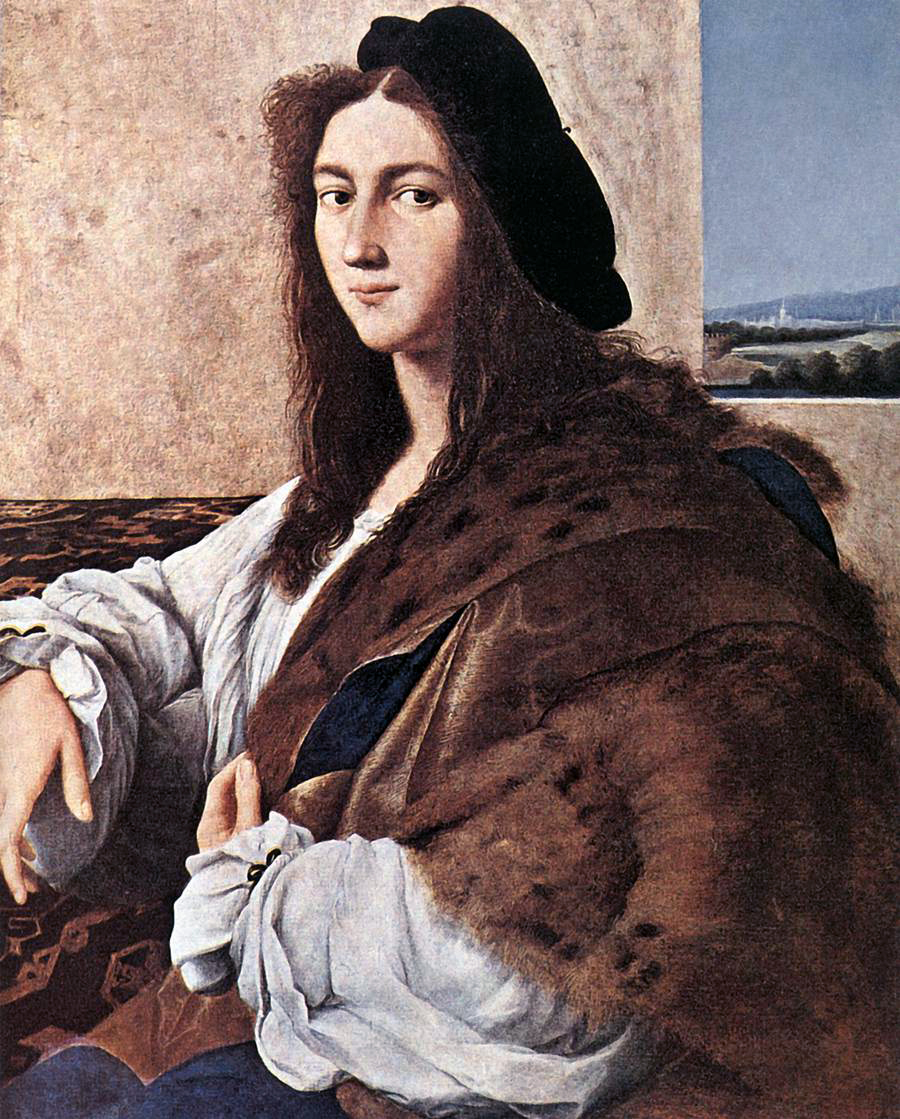
Portrait of a Young Man, Raphael

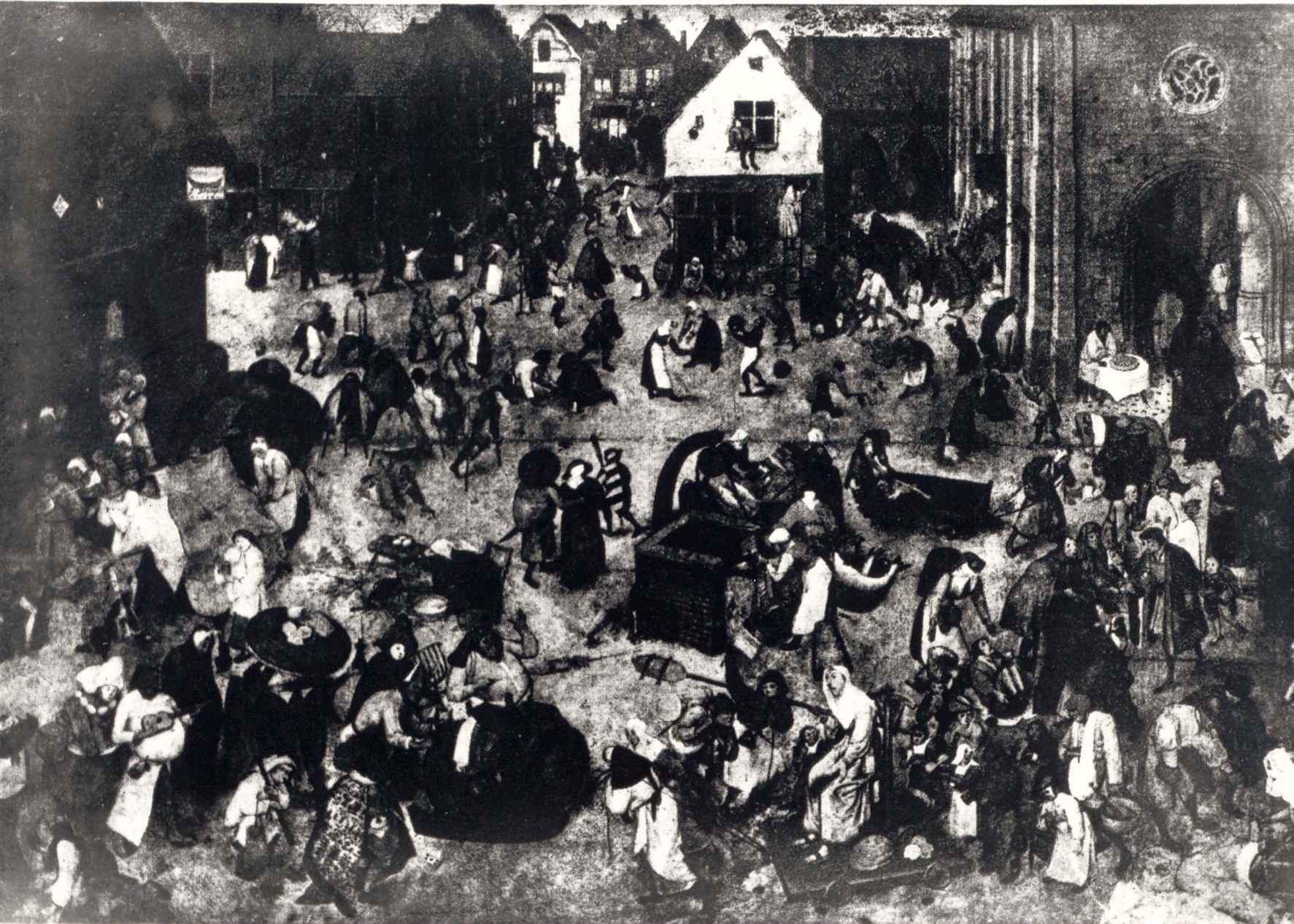
The Fight Between Carnival and Lent, Pieter Bruegel the Elder

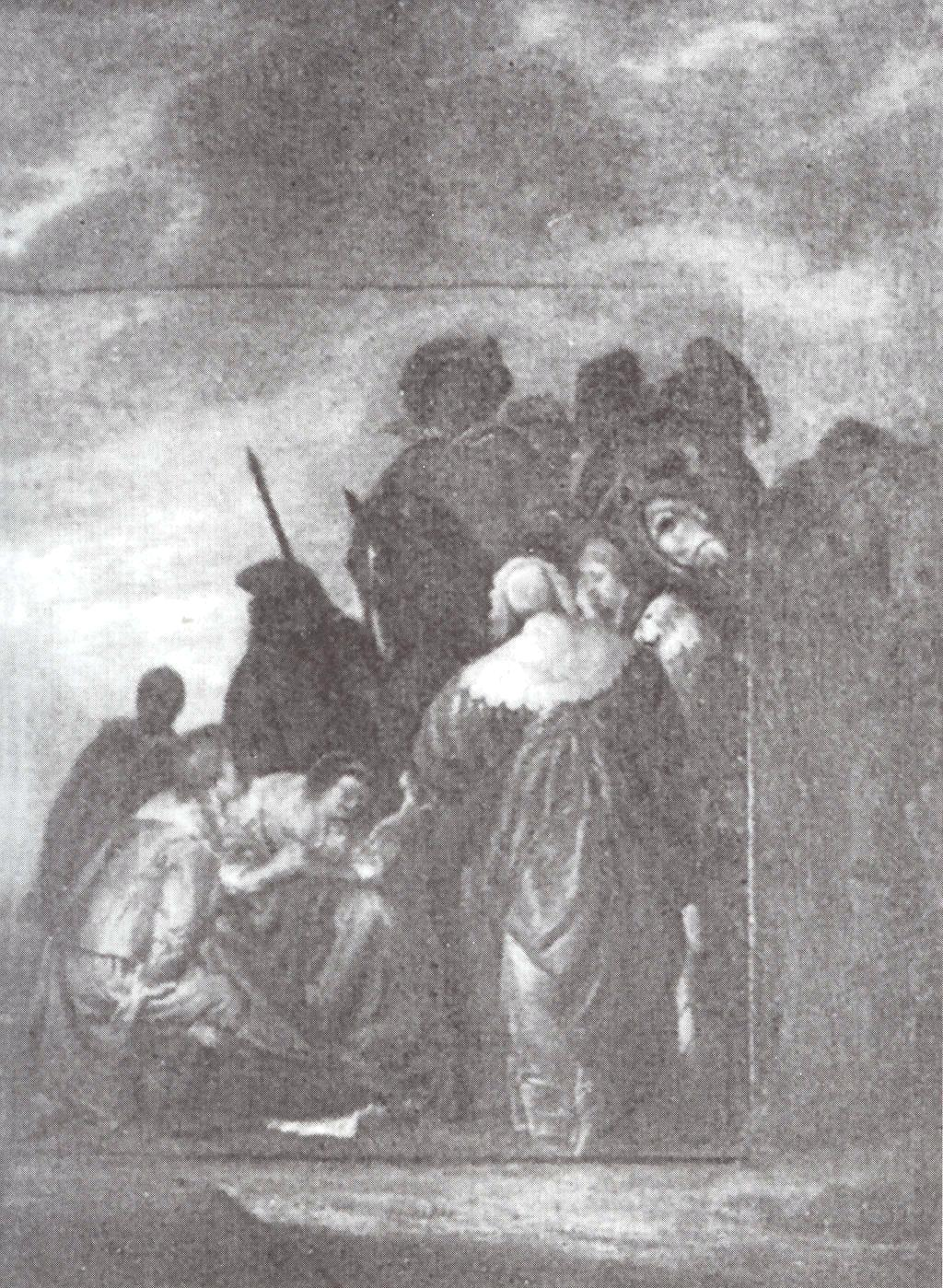
Historical scene, Pieter Codde

== Directors ==
- Władysław Łuszczkiewicz (1883–1900)
- Feliks Kopera (1901–1949)
- Tadeusz Dobrowolski (1950–1956)
- Adam Bochnak (1957–1962)
- Jerzy Banach (1963–1974)
- Tadeusz Chruścicki (1974–1985)
- Janina Bezwińska (acting; 1985–1986)
- Kazimierz Nowacki (1986–1989)
- Tadeusz Chruścicki (1989–2000)
- Zofia Gołubiew (2000–2015)
- Andrzej Betlej (2016–2020)
- Andrzej Szczerski (2020-2025)

Source.

== See also ==
- Culture of Kraków
- National Museum, Poznań
- National Museum, Warsaw
- National Museum, Wrocław
- Culture of Poland
- Beautiful Virgin Mary from Krużlowa
