= Andrzej Szczerski =

Art historian (born 1971)

- Born: 1971; Kraków
- Occupations: Art historian, art critic
- Known for: Director of the National Museum in Kraków

Academic background
- Education: Jagiellonian University

Academic work
- Discipline: Art history
- Institutions: National Museum in Kraków

Andrzej Szczerski (born 1971) is an art historian and critic, professor at the Jagiellonian University, director of the National Museum in Kraków.

== Biography ==
Brother of Krzysztof Szczerski. In 1995 he graduated with a master's degree in art history from the Jagiellonian University. In 2000 he obtained doctorate. In 2010 he obtained habilitation.

He was appointed head of the Department of the History of Modern Art at the Institute of History of the Jagiellonian University. He supervised four doctoral dissertations. In the years 2009–2017, he was President of the Polish Section of the International Association of Art Critics (AICA).

== Works ==
- Wzorce tożsamości. Recepcja sztuki brytyjskiej w Europie Środkowej około roku 1900. Kraków. 2002.
- Modernizacje. Sztuka i architektura w nowych państwach Europy Środkowo-Wschodniej 1918–1939. Łódź. 2010.
- Sztuka projektowania. Z historii Wydziału Form Przemysłowych ASP w Krakowie. Kraków. 2014.
- Cztery nowoczesności. Teksty o sztuce i architekturze polskiej XX wieku. Kraków. 2015.
- Views of Albion, The Reception of British Art and Design in Central Europe (1890–1918). Oxford. 2015.
- Transformacja. Sztuka w Europie Środkowo-Wschodniej po 1989 roku. Kraków. 2018.
- Transformation. Art In East-Central Europe after 1989. Kraków. 2018.

== Awards and honors ==
- Curatorial Prize from the Association for Art History (2022)
- Knight's Cross of the Order of Polonia Restituta (2023)
