= List of ambassadors of Poland to the United Kingdom =

Ambassador of Republic of Poland to the United Kingdom
- Ambasador Rzeczypospolitej Polskiej w Wielkiej Brytanii
- Coat of arms of Poland
- Style: Mr. Ambassador (informal); His Excellency (diplomatic)
- Reports to: Polish Ministry of Foreign Affairs
- Seat: London, United Kingdom
- Appointer: President of Poland
- Term length: No fixed term
- Formation: 1766
- Website: Polish Embassy – London

The Republic of Poland ambassador to the United Kingdom (known formally as the Ambassador Extraordinary and Plenipotentiary of the Republic of Poland to the Court of St James's) is the official representative of the Government of the Republic of Poland to the King and Government of the United Kingdom of Great Britain and Northern Ireland.

The main building of the embassy is located in the City of Westminster close to the Regent's Park. Moreover the Consular and Economic sections are located in the City of London on Bouverie Street. In addition there are Consulates General located in Belfast, Edinburgh and Manchester.

== History ==
The first permanent Polish diplomatic mission was created in late 18th century by the last King of Poland, Stanislaus Augustus. After partitions of Poland, there was over a century gap in diplomatic relations. The mission was re-established following Poland regaining independence in the aftermath of World War I.

== Ambassadors of Poland to the Court of St James's ==
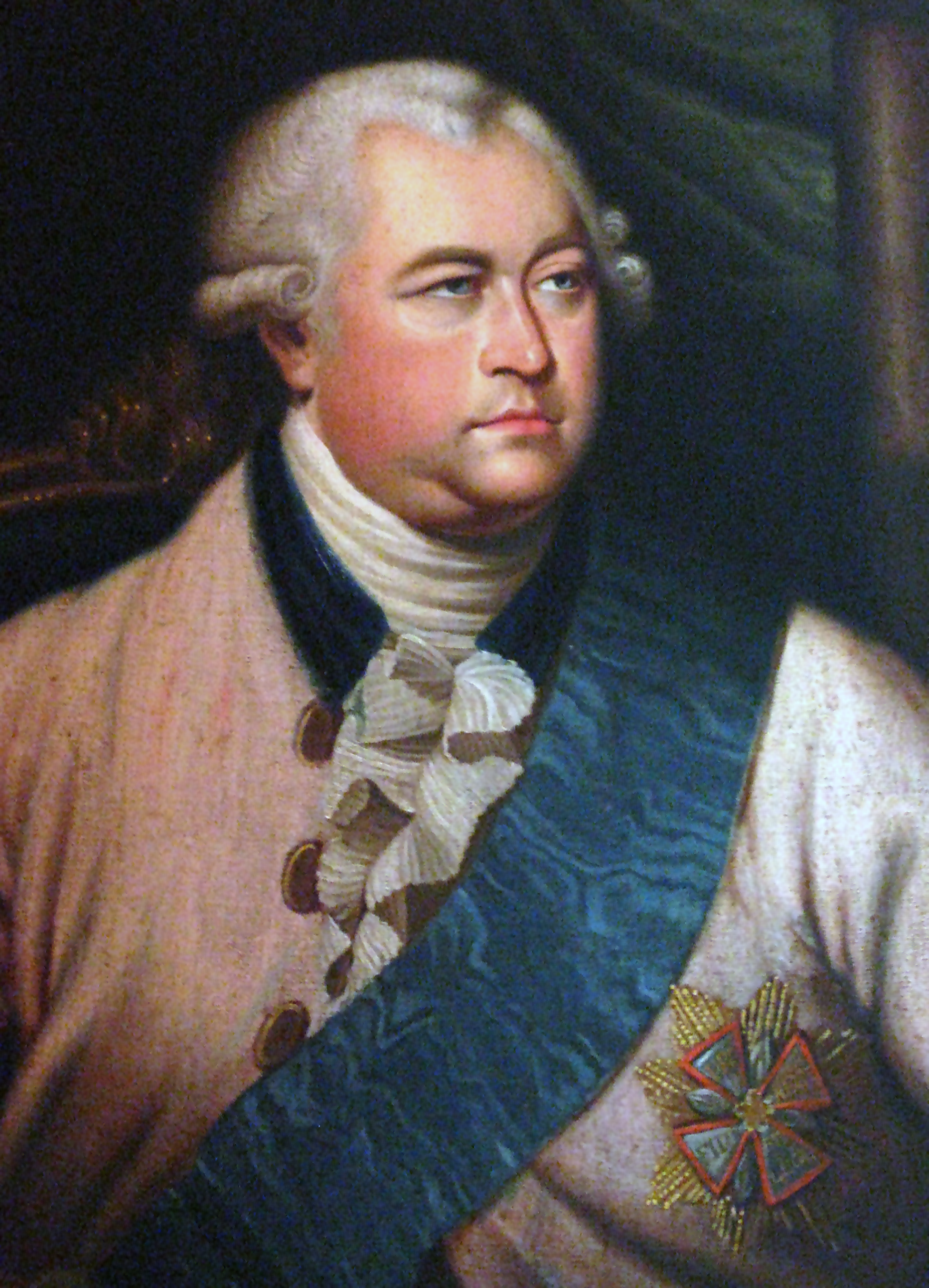
Franciszek Bukaty

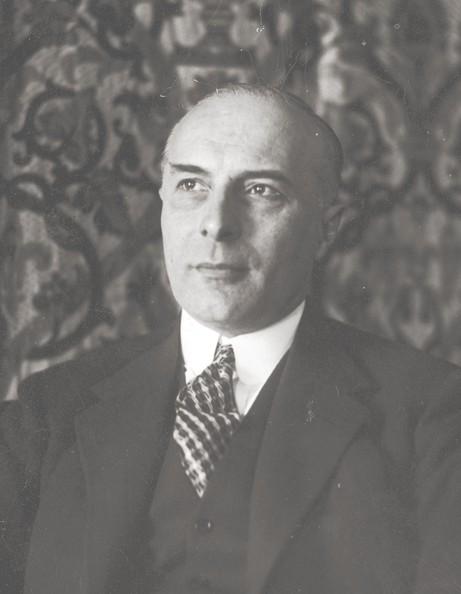
Prince Eustachy Sapieha

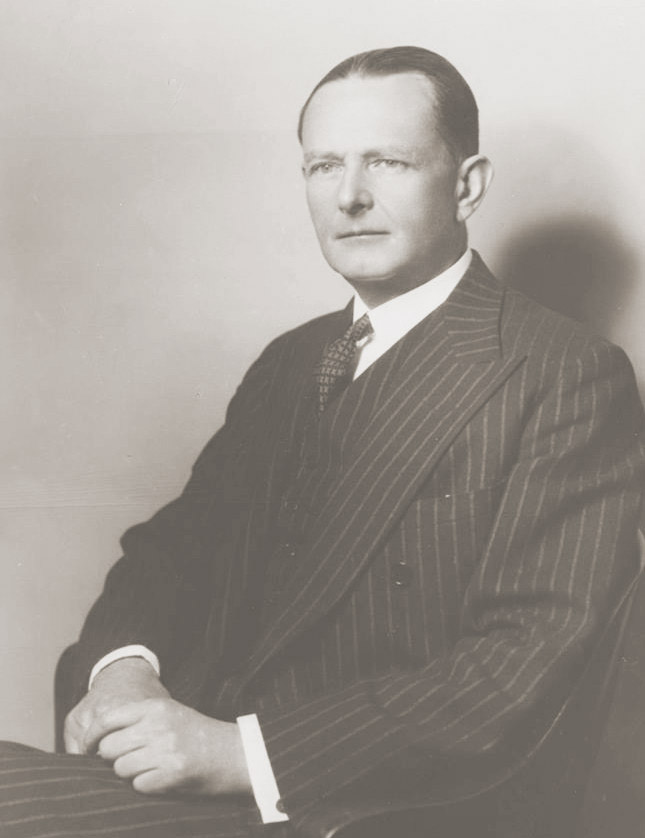
Count Edward Bernard Raczyński

=== Polish-Lithuanian Commonwealth ===
1. 1553 Thomas Stafford
2. 1763 Józef Poniński
3. 1766–1768 General Charles Lee
4. 1769–1772 Tadeusz Burzyński
5. 1772–1785 Franciszek Bukaty

Note: Military Partitions of Poland ended the existence of a sovereign Polish state for over a century.

=== Second Polish Republic ===
Note: Second Republic was created in 1918.

1. 1918–1919 Władysław Sobański (Delegate of the Polish National Committee)
2. 1919–1920 Eustachy Sapieha (Envoy)
3. 1920–1921 Jan Ciechanowski (Chargé d'Affaires a.i.)
4. 1921–1922 Władysław Wróblewski (Envoy)
5. 1922–1929 Konstanty Skirmunt (Envoy)
6. 1929–1934 Konstanty Skirmunt (Ambassador)
7. 1934–1945 Edward Raczyński

Note: Edward Raczyński was the ambassador of the Polish government-in-exile to United Kingdom from 1939 until 1945.

=== Polish People's Republic ===
Note: Officially, Polish People's Republic is the name used since 1952. Unofficially, this name is used for all Polish communist governments since 1944.

1. 1945–1949 Henryk Strasburger
2. 1949–1953 Jerzy Michałowski
3. 1953–1956 Eugeniusz Milnikiel
4. 1960–1964 Witold Rodziński
5. 1964–1969 Jerzy Morawski
6. 1969–1972 Marian Dobrosielski
7. 1972–1978 Artur Starewicz
8. 1978–1983 Jan Bisztyga
9. 1987–1990 Zbigniew Gertych

=== Third Polish Republic ===
Note: modern Poland.

1. 1990–1993 Tadeusz de Virion
2. 1994–1999 Ryszard Stemplowski
3. 1999–2004 Stanisław Komorowski
4. 2004–2006 Zbigniew Matuszewski
5. 2006–2012 Barbara Tuge-Erecińska
6. 2012–2016 Witold Sobków
7. 2016–2021 Arkady Rzegocki
8. 2022–2025 Piotr Wilczek
9. since 2026 Rafał Wiśniewski (Chargé d'Affaires a.i.)

== See also ==
- List of ambassadors of the United Kingdom to Poland
- Poland–United Kingdom relations
