= Anna Sochańska =

Polish politician

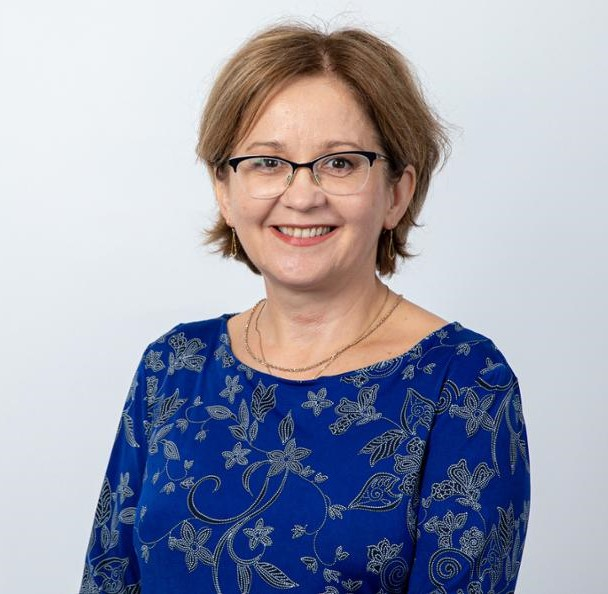

Poland Ambassador to Ireland
- In office September 2019 – 25 August 2023
- Appointed by: Andrzej Duda
- President: Michael D. Higgins
- Preceded by: Ryszard Sarkowicz
- Succeeded by: Arkady Rzegocki

Personal details
- Education: University of Warsaw
- Profession: Diplomat

Anna Jolanta Sochańska is a Polish diplomat who served as an Ambassador to Ireland between 2019 and 2023.

== Life ==
Sochańska received master's degree from the Institute of Social Prevention and Resocialization at University of Warsaw, writing her thesis about the informal behavior of prisoners in concentration camps. She also studied at the College of Europe in Bruges (1993–1994).

In 1991, Sochańska started her professional career at the Ministry of Health, where she was responsible for international scientific cooperation. In 1994, she worked for the Office of the Council of Ministers, specifically at the office of the Plenipotentiary for European Integration. In 1995, she joined the Ministry of Foreign Affairs and became a member of the team negotiating the accession of Poland to the European Union, in charge of handling foreign and security policy issues and external affairs. In 1997, she served at the embassy in the Hague during the Dutch and Luxembourg EU presidency. Between 2001 and 2006 she was a Counselor for EU matters at the embassy in London.Upon her return to the MFA, Sochańska was appointed as the head of the EU enlargement policy division and afterwards – a deputy director for South-Eastern Europe, EU Enlargement and the external aspects of migration. In 2014, Sochańska was awarded with Gold Cross of Merit. In 2018, she became director of the Department of European Policy. In August 2019, Sochańska was nominated Ambassador Extraordinary and Plenipotentiary of Poland to Ireland. She presented her letter of credence in October 2019 to the President Michael D. Higgins. She ended her term on 25 August 2023. On 1 December 2023, she became deputy director of the Department of Public and Cultural Diplomacy. Between 26 February 2024 and July 2026, she was director of this Department.
