= Zbigniew Włosowicz =

Polish politician (born 1955)

Deputy Head of the National Security Bureau
- In office 1 February 2013 – August 2015
- Appointed by: Bronisław Komorowski

Undersecretary of State at the Ministry of National Defense
- In office 8 June 2010 – 12 August 2012
- Appointed by: Donald Tusk

Ambassador of Poland to the United Nations
- In office 1993–1997
- Appointed by: Lech Wałęsa
- Secretary-General: Boutros Boutros-Ghali; Kofi Annan
- Preceded by: Robert Mroziewicz
- Succeeded by: Eugeniusz Wyzner

Personal details
- Born: Zbigniew Maria Włosowicz; 3 May 1955 (age 70); Kraków, Poland

Zbigniew Maria Włosowicz (born 3 May 1955) is a Polish politician and diplomat who is current the Deputy Head of the National Security Bureau. He previously served as the Undersecretary of State at the Ministry of National Defense from 2010 to 2012, and was an Ambassador to the United Nations from 1993 to 1997.

== Biography ==
Zbigniew Włosowicz was born in Kraków on 3 May 1955. He graduated from the Faculty of Law and Administration of the Jagiellonian University. He holds a PhD degree in legal sciences. For many years he worked at his home faculty as a lecturer. He specializes in public international law, especially in diplomatic law.

He has been working in diplomacy since 1990. For several years, he was an employee of the Permanent Representation of Poland to the United Nations in New York City, where he was the first secretary from 1990 to 1991, and promoted to the deputy Permanent Representative from 1991 to 1993. From 1993 to 1997, Włosowicz was the ambassador to the United Nations, including from 1996 to 1997, where he represented Poland in the UN Security Council.

From 1998 to 2000, he was Special Adviser on Intergovernmental Affairs in the United Nations Development Program. From 2000 to 2005, he was a Special Representative of the Secretary General of the United Nations and head of UNFICYP, the UN peacekeeping forces stationed in Cyprus.

From 2006 to 2007, he was the dean of the Faculty of International Relations of the Higher School of Administration in Bielsko-Biała, until the faculty was incorporated into the Faculty of Social Sciences (then the Faculty of Humanities and International Studies). From 2008, he lectured at the Fr. Józef Tischner, and from 2009 to 2010, he lectured again at the Higher School of Administration in Bielsko-Biała.

On 8 June 2010, Włosowicz was appointed Undersecretary of State for International Affairs at the Ministry of National Defense. On 12 August 2012, he was dismissed from that position.

On 1 February 2013, Włosowicz was appointed deputy head of the National Security Bureau.

In May 2015, Włosowicz was one of the Polish people sanctioned by Russia during the Russo-Ukrainian war.

He ceased to perform this function in August 2015.

In 2015, Włosowicz was awarded the Knight's Cross of the Order of Polonia Restituta.
