= Krzysztof Szczerski =

Polish politician

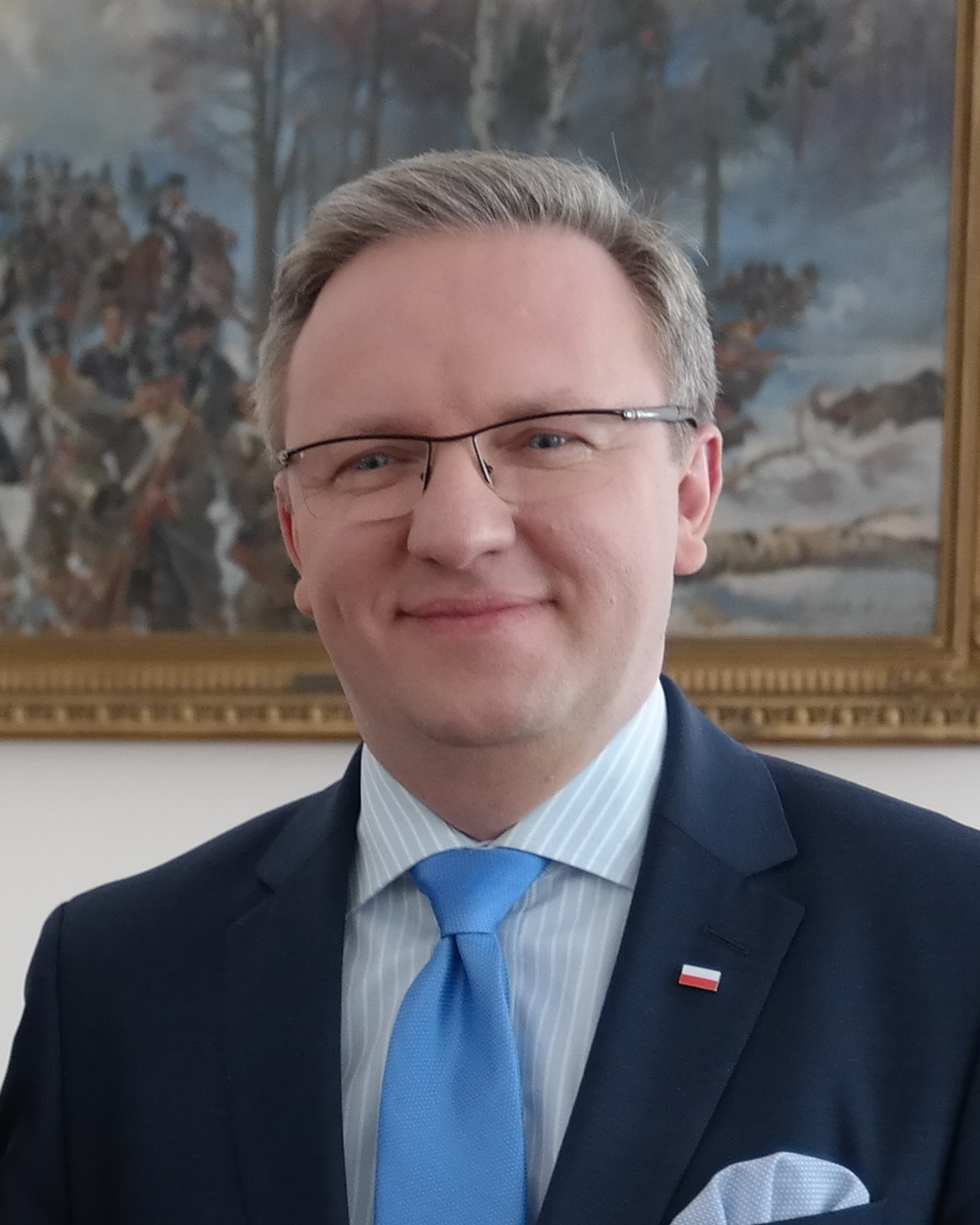

Poland Ambassador to the United Nations
- In office 18 August 2021 – 2026
- Appointed by: Andrzej Duda
- Secretary-General: António Guterres
- Preceded by: Joanna Wronecka

Head of the International Policy Bureau
- In office 15 April 2021 – 13 July 2021
- Appointed by: Andrzej Duda
- Preceded by: Office established
- Succeeded by: Jakub Kumoch

Secretary of State in the Chancellery of the President
- In office 7 August 2015 – 13 July 2021
- Appointed by: Andrzej Duda

Chief of the President's Cabinet
- In office 4 April 2017 – 4 January 2021
- Appointed by: Andrzej Duda
- Preceded by: Adam Kwiatkowski
- Succeeded by: Paweł Szrot

Member of the Sejm
- In office 8 November 2011 – 7 August 2015
- Constituency: Kraków I

Undersecretary of State in the Ministry of Foreign Affairs
- In office 5 January 2007 – 10 September 2007
- Appointed by: Lech Kaczyński

Personal details
- Born: 15 April 1973 (age 53) Kraków, Poland
- Party: Law and Justice
- Education: Jagiellonian University
- Profession: Political scientist, politician, university teacher

Krzysztof Maria Szczerski (born 15 April 1973 in Kraków) is a Polish political scientist and politician who served as Poland's Ambassador to the United Nations in New York from 2021 to 2026.

Szczerski previously served, among other positions, as deputy to the Sejm of Poland (2011–2015) and Under Secretary and Secretary of the Chancellery of the President of the Republic of Poland Andrzej Duda (2015–2021).

== Education and scientific career ==
Szczerski graduated from the Institute of Political Science of the Jagiellonian University, Kraków (1997). He also studied at the Robert Schuman Institute, Budapest (1996). In 2001, he defended his PhD thesis on the European Committee of the Regions. In 2010, he received a postdoctoral degree (habilitation). His postdoctoral dissertation entitled "The Dynamics of the European System" won the award of the Prime Minister. In 2019, he earned the title of professor of social sciences.

Following his graduation, he was employed as a lecturer and researcher at the Institute of Modern Political Science, Jagiellonian University. In 2013, he became an associate professor. He served two terms as Deputy Director of the Institute of Political Sciences and International Relations. He was also an assistant professor at the Wyższa Szkoła Biznesu – National-Louis University, Nowy Sącz. He was member of the Council of the Polish Institute of International Affairs. Among his doctoral students is Jakub Kumoch (2015).

== Political career ==
Between 1998 and 2001 Szczerski was cooperating with the Chancellery of the Prime Minister of Poland. From 1999 to 2000 he served as an advisor to the Minister of Health in the area of the European integration, regional health policy and health care systems. In 2007, he was appointed Under Secretary of State in the Ministry of Foreign Affairs of Poland. Next, he was Under Secretary of State in the Office of the Committee for European Integration. He was member of the Civil Service Council to the Prime Minister (2009–2010). In 2011, he was elected deputy to the Sejm of Poland from the Law and Justice list. In January 2015, Szczerski was appointed as representative of the Polish Parliament in the Parliamentary Assembly of the Council of Europe. He ended his term as a deputy on 7 August 2015, when he was appointed Secretary of State at the Chancellery of the President of the Republic of Poland Andrzej Duda. From 4 April 2017 to 4 January 2021 he was Chief of the Cabinet of the President. On 4 January 2021, he became responsible for the establishment of the International Policy Bureau of the President of Poland. From 15 April 2021 to 13 July 2021, he was head of the Bureau. On 18 August 2021, Szczerski started his term as a Permanent Representative of Poland to the United Nations. Within the UN, he has held the positions of Vice-Chairman of the Governing Board of the United Nations Children's Fund, Chairman of the UN Commission for Social Development, and Vice-Chairman of the UN Economic and Social Council.

== Personal life ==
Besides Polish, he speaks English, French, Spanish, and Russian. He is the brother of Andrzej Szczerski, an art historian.

== Honours ==
- 2017 – Order of the Cavalier of Madara, 1st Class, Bulgaria
- 2019 – Grand Commander of the Order for Merits to Lithuania, Lithuania
- 2019 – Grand Officer of the Order of the Star of Romania, Romania
- 2020 – Knight's Cross of the Hungarian Order of Merit, Hungary
- 2021 – Order of Merit, 3rd Class, Ukraine
- 2021 – Officer's Cross of the Order of Polonia Restituta, Poland
- Grand Cross of the Royal Norwegian Order of Merit, Norway
- Grand Officer of the Order of Leopold II, Belgium
- Order of Tomáš Garrigue Masaryk, Czech Republic
- Commander, First Class, of the Order of the Lion of Finland, Finland

== Works ==
- Integracja europejska. Cywilizacja i polityka, Wydawnictwo Uniwersytetu Jagiellońskiego, Kraków 2003.
- Wybór Europy: katolik wobec polityki w Unii Europejskiej, Wydawnictwo WAM, Kraków 2003.
- Porządki biurokratyczne, Księgarnia Akademicka, Kraków 2004.
- Administracja publiczna w modelu zarządzania wielopasmowego, Centrum Europejskie Natolin, Warszawa 2005.
- Dynamika systemu europejskiego, Wydawnictwo Uniwersytetu Jagiellońskiego 2008.
- Oburzeni, Biały Kruk, Kraków 2013.
- Kazania sejmowe, Biały Kruk, Kraków 2013.
- Wygaszanie Polski, Biały Kruk, Kraków 2015.
- Dialogi o naprawie Rzeczypospolitej, Biały Kruk, Kraków 2015.
- Polskość jest przywilejem, Biały Kruk, Kraków 2016.
- Utopia Europejska. Kryzys integracji i polska inicjatywa naprawy, Biały Kruk, 2017.
- Chluba i zguba. Antologia najnowszej publicystyki patriotycznej, Biały Kruk, Kraków 2020, ISBN 978-83-7553-307-1.
