= Jerzy Baurski =

Polish diplomat

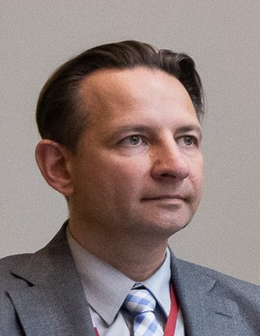

7th Poland Ambassador to the Council of Europe
- In office August 2020 – July 2024
- Preceded by: Janusz Stańczyk
- Succeeded by: Aleksander Pociej

Personal details
- Born: January 24, 1974 (age 52) Warsaw, Poland
- Children: 2 daughters
- Education: University of Warsaw
- Profession: Diplomat

Jerzy Jacek Baurski (born 24 January 1974 in Warsaw) is a Polish diplomat, Permanent Representative to the Council of Europe from 2020 to 2024.

== Life ==
Jerzy Baurski graduated from international relations at University of Warsaw. He has been studying also at the Latin America studies and European studies at the University of Warsaw as well as at the Université catholique de Louvain, Belgium.

In 1999 he joined the Ministry of Foreign Affairs (MFA). From 2000 to 2001 he was attaché at the Permanent Mission to the UN Office in Geneva. Following his work at the Balkan Unit of the Department of the European Policy, MFA (2001–2003). Between 2003 and 2007, he served as Third, then Second Secretary in the Political Division, Embassy of the Republic of Poland to the Kingdom of the Netherlands, The Hague. Back in Warsaw, he has been for a year at the MFA Department of the European Union, EU Institutional Unit. From 2008 to 2011 he was Head of Human Rights Division, Department of the United Nations and Human Rights, and from 2011 to 2012 Deputy Director of the Department of the United Nations and Human Rights. Between 2012 and 2017, he served as Minister-Counsellor and deputy head at the Permanent Mission of the Republic of Poland to the UN Office in Geneva. From December 2017 to July 2020, he was Director of the MFA Department of the United Nations and Human Rights, being also Head of the MFA UN Security Council Polish Membership Task Force (2018/2019). He was responsible for Polish campaigns for membership at the United Nations Human Rights Council (term 2020–2022), UNESCO Executive Board (term 2019–2023), as well as Witold Bańka election for the World Anti-Doping Agency president. On 23 July 2020 he was nominated Permanent Representative to the Council of Europe in Strasbourg, taking the post following month. He ended his term in July 2024.

== Personal life ==
Besides Polish, Baurski speaks English, Spanish and French. He is married, with two daughters.

== Honours ==
He was awarded with Knight's Cross of the Order of Polonia Restituta (2019)
