= Janusz Stańczyk =

Polish politician

Janusz Stańczyk Ph.D.
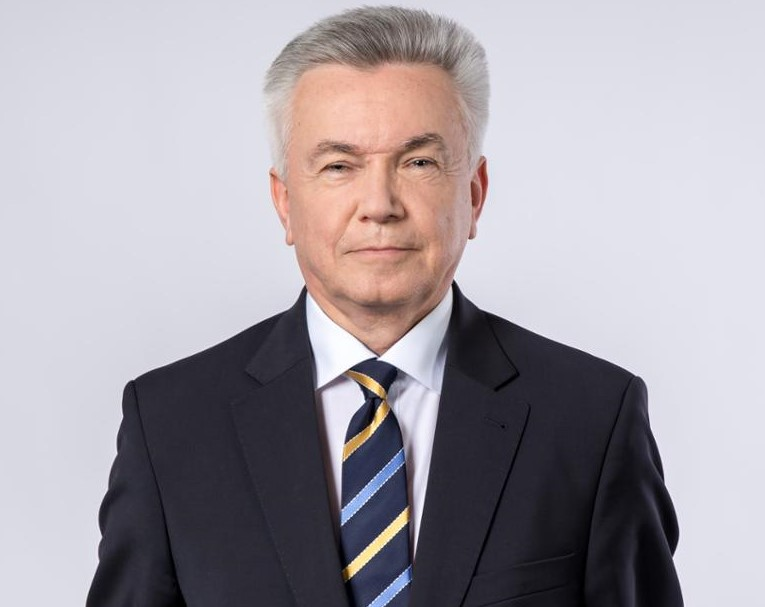

16th Poland Ambassador to the United Nations
- In office 2000–2004
- Preceded by: Eugeniusz Wyzner
- Succeeded by: Andrzej Towpik

Poland Ambassador to the Netherlands
- In office 2007–2012
- Preceded by: Jan Michałowski
- Succeeded by: Jan Borkowski

6th Poland Ambassador to the Council of Europe
- In office 2015–2020
- Preceded by: Urszula Gacek
- Succeeded by: Jerzy Baurski

Personal details
- Born: 22 January 1955 (age 71) Tarnów, Poland
- Children: two
- Education: Jagiellonian University
- Profession: Diplomat

Janusz Józef Stańczyk (born 22 January 1955 in Tarnów, Poland) is a Polish diplomat.

== Education ==
Janusz Stańczyk graduated from the Faculty of Law at Jagiellonian University in 1977. He attended Saint Louis University School of Law from 1990 to 1991. In 1985 at the Polish Academy of Science, he defended his doctoral thesis on international law.

== Career ==
Between 1978 and 1980, Stańczyk worked at Jagiellonian University, and afterward at the Academy of Sciences (between 1983 and 1992). In 1992, he joined the Ministry of Foreign Affairs where he became the director of the legal and treaty department. In 1995, Stańczyk became the director general of the Ministry. Between 1997 and 1999, he was under secretary of state there. Stańczyk served as an ambassador to the United Nations from 2000 to –2004. After this he was the director of the Department of the United Nations and Human Rights. Between 4 November 2005 and 6 September 2006 he once again served as the under secretary of state. Stańczyk was the ambassador to the Netherlands and the Organisation for the Prohibition of Chemical Weapons from 2007 to 2012. Between 2015 and 2020, he was the permanent representative to the Council of Europe. Since 1 September 2020 he served as the director of the MFA Department of Americas. On 31 January 2022 Stańczyk retired.

== Personal life ==
Stańczyk besides Polish speaks English and French. He is married, with a son and a daughter.

== Honours ==
He was awarded with Officers's Cross of the Order of Polonia Restituta (2012).
