= Witold Sobków =

Polish scholar, public servant, diplomat and former deputy foreign minister

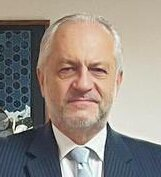
- Witold Sobków (2024)

Poland Ambassador to the United Kingdom
- In office 2012–2016
- Appointed by: Bronisław Komorowski
- Monarch: Elizabeth II
- Preceded by: Barbara Tuge-Erecińska
- Succeeded by: Arkady Rzegocki

Poland Ambassador to the United Nations
- In office 2010–2012
- Appointed by: Bronisław Komorowski
- Secretary-General: Ban Ki-moon
- Preceded by: Andrzej Towpik
- Succeeded by: Ryszard Sarkowicz

Undersecretary of State in the Ministry of Foreign Affairs
- In office 9 October 2006 – 27 December 2006
- Appointed by: Jarosław Kaczyński

Poland Ambassador to Ireland
- In office 2002–2006
- Appointed by: Aleksander Kwaśniewski
- President: Mary McAleese
- Preceded by: Janusz Skolimowski
- Succeeded by: Tadeusz Szumowski

Personal details
- Born: 17 February 1961 (age 65) Warsaw
- Spouse: Iwona Sobków
- Education: University of Warsaw
- Occupation: Diplomat, philologist

Witold Sobków (born 17 February 1961 in Warsaw) is a Polish scholar, public servant, diplomat, and former deputy foreign minister.

== Early life and education ==
From 1979 he studied at the University of Warsaw, obtaining an MA in English Philology in 1984 and an MA in Italian Philology in 1987.

In 1991, he was a fellow in diplomacy at the Hoover Institution on War, Revolution, and Peace at Stanford University. He had also studied in Siena, Perugia and Venice.

Between 1998 and 2000, he studied Islam, Security in Southeast Asia, and basic Arabic at the University of London.

In 2008, he completed programs in the field of national and international security at Harvard University.

== Career ==
From 1984 to 1991, he worked as a philologist and lecturer at the Faculty of Modern Languages at the University of Warsaw.

In 1991, after the Solidarity Revolution, he began to work for the Ministry of Foreign Affairs. From 1993 to 2000 he was based at the Polish Embassy in London, where he worked his way up to the position of minister plenipotentiary and deputy head of mission.

Returning to Poland, he held managerial positions in the ministry, serving in turn as deputy director of the Department of Western Europe, director for Non-European Countries and the United Nations System, and senior adviser to the Minister for European Affairs.

From 2002 to 2006, he was the Polish ambassador to Ireland.

From October 9, 2006, to December 27, 2006, he served as Under-Secretary of State For European Affairs. In January 2007, he started working as Titular Ambassador at the Department of Foreign Policy Strategy and Planning. From January 1, 2008, to April 9, 2010, he held the position of Political Director /CFSP-EU/

He then served as Poland’s Permanent Representative to the United Nations in New York and from August 2012 to August 2016 as the Polish Ambassador to the Court of St. James's in London. From August 2016 to February 2018 he again served as Political Director at the MFA. Then he was Director for Asia and the Pacific. Since September 2021 he has been Political Director again. Since October 2024 he has acted as Special Envoy for the Indo-Pacific and Special Envoy for Afghanistan.

== Selected publications ==
- Psycholinguistic approaches to linguistic theories, Warsaw 1988, Ed. UW.
- La Realizzazione delle tecniche di lettura al livello medio-superiore, Warsaw 1988, Ed. UW.
- Współczesny Sudan: polityka islamska, Warsaw 1998, PISM.
