= Michal Bernasik =

German architect

Michal Bernasik (born 1979) is a German-Polish architect, designer and urbanist.

After practicing at Ron Arad's in London, he set up his own practice in Cologne, Germany in 2006. Since then he has worked and cooperated with many great figures of architecture, culture and art. He is laureate of several architectural prizes and winner of many international competitions.

== See also ==
- National Museum's Forum
- Max Ernst Museum
- Bertelsmann Unter den Linden 1
