= Franciszek Bukaty =

Polish diplomat

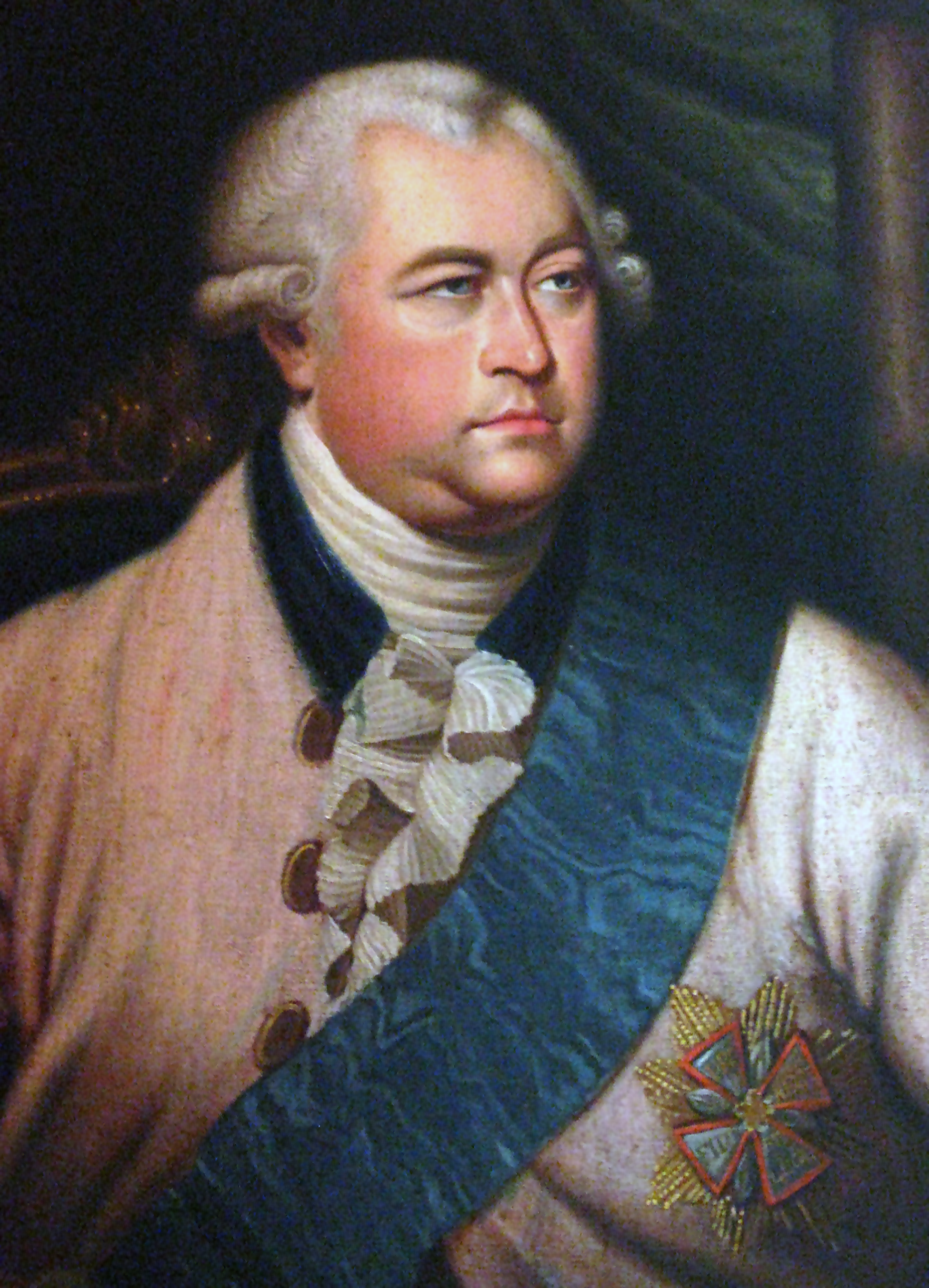
Franciszek Bukaty

Franciszek Bukaty (1747–1797) was a Polish diplomat.

He was (1772–1785) Polish chargé d'affaires, and later ambassador in London.

At first the Polish King Stanisław August Poniatowski wanted to make an English lawyer John Lind Polish ambassador in London, but British authorities opposed, because it was seen as 'unpatriotic' if an Englishman represented a foreign court.
