= Arkady Rzegocki =

Polish political scientist (born 1971)

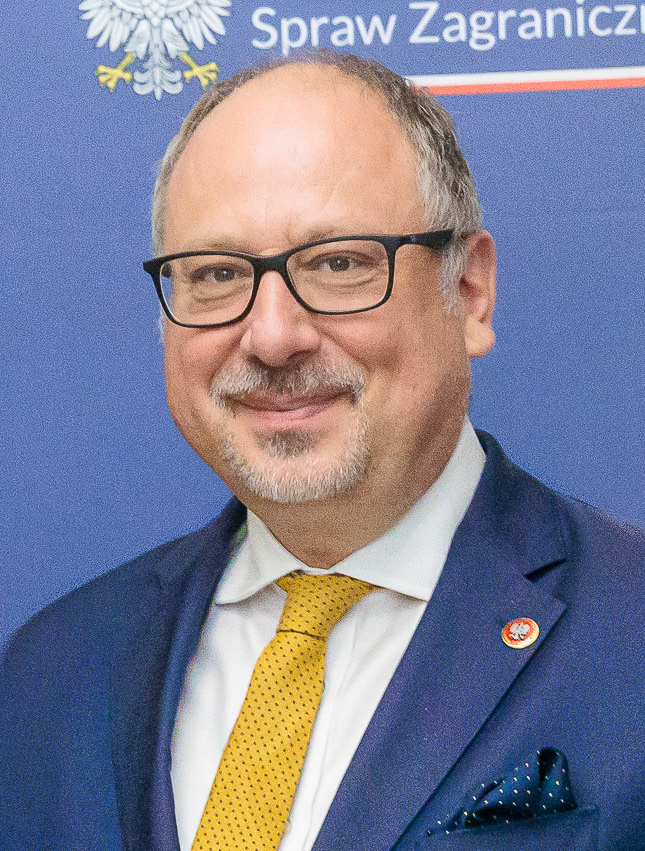

Poland Ambassador to the United Kingdom
- In office September 2016 – 30 June 2021
- Appointed by: Andrzej Duda
- Monarch: Elizabeth II
- Preceded by: Witold Sobków
- Succeeded by: Piotr Wilczek

Head of The Foreign Service
- In office 1 July 2021 – 25 August 2023
- Preceded by: Office established
- Succeeded by: Piotr Rychlik

Poland Ambassador to Ireland
- In office 1 September 2023 – July 2024
- Preceded by: Anna Sochańska

Personal details
- Born: 22 August 1971 (age 55) Tarnobrzeg
- Spouse: Jolanta Rzegocka
- Children: 3
- Education: Jagiellonian University

Arkady Józef Rzegocki (born August 22, 1971 in Tarnobrzeg) is a Polish political scientist, an assistant professor of the Jagiellonian University in Krakow. Between 2016 and 2021 he served as the Republic of Poland Ambassador to the United Kingdom. Head of The Foreign Service in the Ministry of Foreign Affairs (2021–2023). From 1 September 2023 to July 2024 he served as the Ambassador to Ireland.

== Career ==
Rzegocki graduated from the Jagiellonian University. Between 1996 and 2010 he worked at the Department of History of Political and Legal Doctrines of the Faculty of Law and Administration of the Jagiellonian University in Cracow. Since 2010 he has been an assistant professor at the Faculty of International and Political Studies of the Jagiellonian University.

He was an associate professor of the Polish University Abroad in London (2011–2016). In 2011, he founded Jagiellonian University Polish Research Centre in London.

He was a councillor for the City of Kraków from 2014 to 2016, elected as a conservative Law and Justice candidate.

== Private life ==
Arkady Rzegocki is married to English philologist and theatre historian Jolanta Rzegocka. They have three daughters.

== See also ==
- List of Ambassadors of Poland to the United Kingdom
- Poland–United Kingdom relations
