= Andrzej Towpik =

Polish politician

Andrzej K. Towpik

Poland Ambassador to the United Nations
- In office 2004–2010
- Preceded by: Janusz Stańczyk
- Succeeded by: Witold Sobków

1st Poland Ambassador to NATO
- In office 1997–2002
- Preceded by: Andrzej Krzeczunowicz
- Succeeded by: Jerzy Maria Nowak

Personal details
- Born: February 1, 1939 (age 87) Brest, Poland
- Education: Jagiellonian University
- Profession: Diplomat

Andrzej Kazimierz Towpik (born 1 February 1939 in Brest) is a Polish diplomat.

He served as an ambassador to the United Nations (2004-2010), as well as the country's permanent representative to NATO (1997-2002). He was also Under Secretary of State at the Ministry of Foreign Affairs (1994-1997) and at the Ministry of National Defence (2003-2004).

He was awarded with Commander's (2009) and Officer's (1998) Crosses of the Order of Polonia Restituta. He received the Order of the White Star, 2nd class (2002).
