= Eugeniusz Wyzner =

Polish politician (1931–2026)

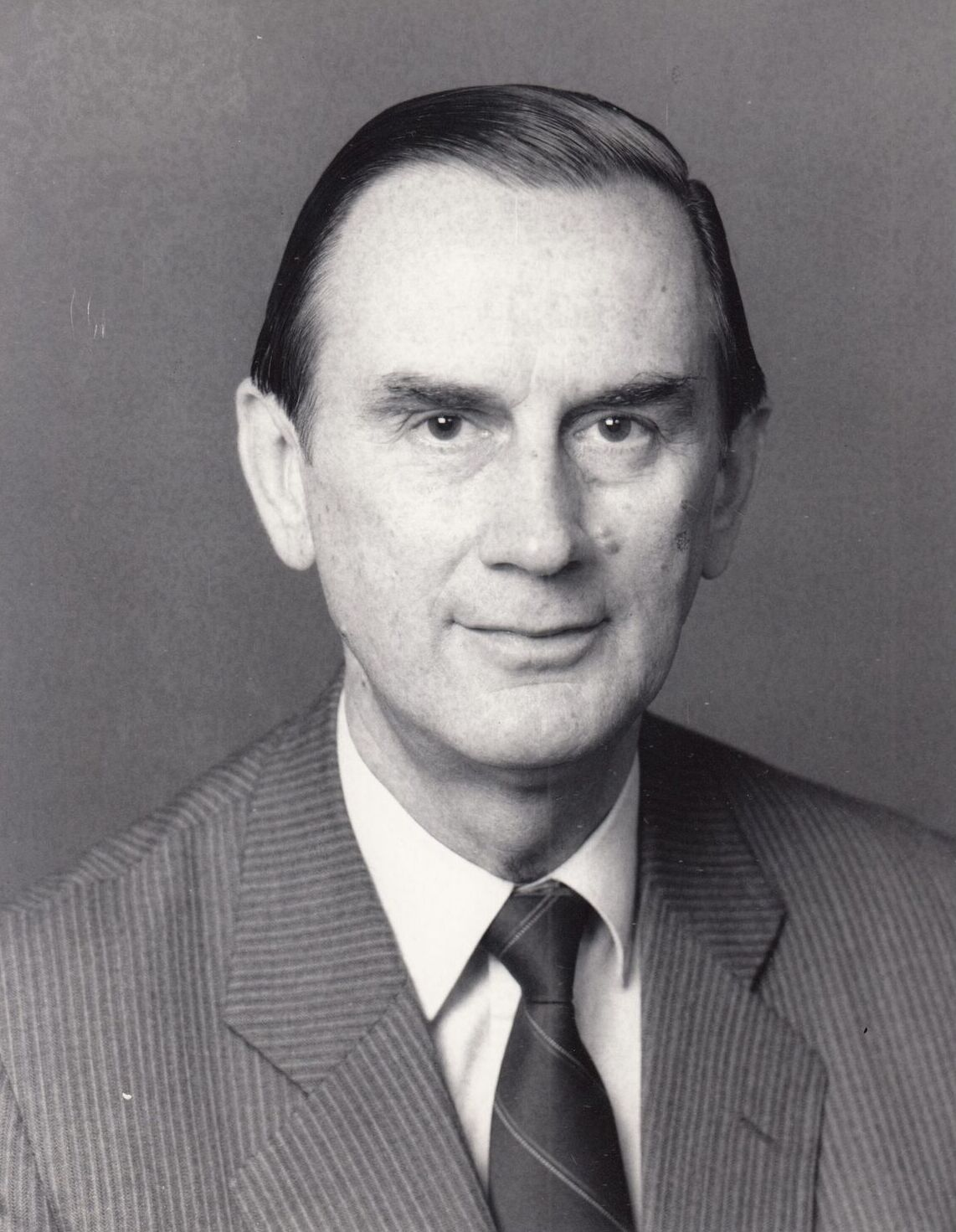
Wyzner in 1987

Eugeniusz Wyzner (31 October 1931 – 15 March 2026) was a Polish politician.

Wyzner was the Deputy Minister of Foreign Affairs (1994–1997), Permanent Representative of Poland to the United Nations in Geneva (1973–1978) and New York (1981–1982 and 1998–1999).

Wyzner died on 15 March 2026, at the age of 94.
