= Lambs of God (painting) =

2009 painting by Julia Curyło

- Baranki Boże (Polish)
- Artist: Julia Curyło
- Year: 2009
- Medium: Oil on canvas
- Dimensions: 187 cm × 280 cm (74 in × 110 in)

Lambs of God (Polish: Baranki Boże) is a painting by Polish contemporary artist Julia Curyło, created in 2009. A mural based on the painting was produced and displayed from January 2010 on one of the walls of the Marymont metro station of the Warsaw Metro. Due to controversies, the exhibition was shortened and ended on 25 March 2010.

== Description ==
The painting Lambs of God was executed in 2009 in oil on canvas, measuring 280 × 187 cm, as part of Julia Curyło's diploma project. It depicts a flock of white and black sheep floating among clouds against the backdrop of the Palace of Culture and Science in Warsaw. In 2010, a mural of the same title, measuring 35 × 3.43 m, was created based on the painting. In January 2010, as part of the sixth edition of the A19 Gallery competition, this mural – one of the winning entries – was installed on the wall of the A19 Marymont station.

== Meaning ==
Ewa Sułek, writing in Format and Artmix, described the inflatable plastic lambs as symbolizing shallow, superficial faith on one hand, while also commenting on the mass production of devotional articles on the other. Kaja Weberowska viewed the hollow, inflatable forms primarily as emblems of modernity, encompassing its culture and mass production. Izabela Kowalczyk interpreted the work as depicting a confrontation between earthly/erotic elements and spiritual ones. The artist, Julia Curyło, addressed the painting in statements related to the surrounding controversies. She explained that the absurd, nonsensical pairing of an innocent sheep with an erotic object was intended as a playful engagement with kitsch and popular culture. In an interview for Musli Magazine, she highlighted the work's social commentary and satirical character. According to her academic supervisor, Leon Tarasewicz, the painting draws on the tradition of symbolism.

== Controversies ==
Shortly after the mural's installation, the Alert24 portal reported that the depicted sheep resembled inflatable dolls sold in sex shops. In response, the association Twoja Sprawa launched a campaign urging Metro Warszawskie and the Mayor of Warsaw to remove the mural through protest emails. Councillor Maciej Maciejowski submitted a formal inquiry to the Mayor of Warsaw on the matter. Protesters argued that the combination of the title Lamb of God with what they perceived as a sex shop item offended religious sensibilities. The Indeks 73 portal defended the work in an open letter dated 18 January 2010 addressed to the CEO of Metro Warszawskie. The letter asserted that the mural had received positive responses from critics and most metro users, and that negative reactions should not result in censorship. In a statement issued amid the controversies, Julia Curyło confirmed that the sheep were modeled on sex shop items but denied any intent to offend religious feelings. On 20 January 2010, the Program Council of the A19 Competition issued a statement affirming the continuation of the mural's display. However, due to the controversies, the exhibition period was shortened to end on 25 March 2010, with the work to be replaced before Easter by another competition entry – Anna Pisarska's Nowe przestrzenie (New Spaces) – from 26 March 2010.

In January 2010, the mural was vandalized with graffiti. Police apprehended the perpetrator at the scene, after which the mural was partially covered and subsequently restored.

== Exhibitions ==
In 2011, the painting Lambs of God was exhibited in the show Odpusty i cudowne widzenia (Indulgences and Miraculous Visions) at the Wozownia galleries in Toruń, Szara Kamienica in Kraków, and Strefa A in Warsaw. It was also presented as part of the Rzeczywistość magiczna (Magical Reality) exhibition at the RING Gallery in Legnica. These exhibitions included screenings of a documentary film produced in March 2010 about the history of the mural at Marymont station A19. In 2013, the painting was shown in the exhibition Pokusa, cuda i rozkosze (Temptation, Miracles, and Pleasures) at Galeria Biała in Lublin.
