= Julia Curyło =

Polish painter and critic

- Born: 1986 (age 39–40); Warsaw
- Education: Academy of Fine Arts in Warsaw
- Notable work: Lambs of God
- Style: Painting; Installation art

Julia Curyło (born 1986 in Warsaw) is a Polish painter and art critic who creates oil paintings and art installations. She is best known for her 2010 large-scale mural titled Lambs of God, created at the Marymont metro station in Warsaw, which caused controversy and brought the artist publicity. Between 2011 and 2016, her work has been displayed at eight individual exhibitions.

In 2009, she graduated with honors from the Painting Faculty of the Academy of Fine Arts in Warsaw, where she studied under Professor Leon Tarasewicz, and from the public art studio led by Professor Mirosław Duchowski.

In September and November 2009, her installation Tulipany (Tulips) was displayed at Hoover Square on Krakowskie Przedmieście Street in Warsaw (later also in Poznań and Katowice). In November 2010, she received the Grand Prix from the Minister of Culture and National Heritage, the award from the BWA City Gallery in Bydgoszcz, and was also the winner of the Grand Prix at the 20th National Review of Young Painting "Promocje 2010" in Legnica. In 2011, she was nominated for the Eugeniusz Geppert Competition.

== Exhibitions ==
Solo exhibitions:

- Galeria Miejska – Hello, Modernity!, Wrocław 2013, curated by Mirosław Jasiński and Ewa Sułek
- Galeria Biała – Pokusy, cuda i rozkosze (Temptations, Miracles and Delights), Lublin 2012
- Galeria aTAK – Cząstka H^{0} (H^{0} Particle), Warsaw 2012, curated by Ewa Sułek
- Galeria Szara and Galeria Strefa A – Odpusty i cudowne widzenia (Fairs and Miraculous Visions), Kraków 2011, curated by Ewa Sułek
- Galeria Sztuki w Legnicy – Rzeczywistość magiczna (Magical Reality), Legnica 2011
- Galeria Wozownia – Odpusty i cudowne widzenia (Fairs and Miraculous Visions), Toruń 2011, curated by Ewa Sułek

Installations in public space:

- Tulipany (Tulips):
  - Warsaw, courtyard of the Academy of Fine Arts, 2010
  - Katowice, as part of the bid for European Capital of Culture, 2010
  - Poznań, Kontener Art Festival, 2010
  - Poznań, No Women No Art Festival, 2010
  - Warsaw, Hoover Square, 2009
- Kury (Hens) – installation in the window display at the Centrum metro station, Warsaw 2010

Group exhibitions:

- Museum of Hunting and Horsemanship – Zwierzę – inspiracja, symbol, pretekst (Animal – Inspiration, Symbol, Pretext), Warsaw 2013
- Galeria -1 – Kompas sztuki (Compass of Art), Warsaw 2012
- Galeria Gardzielnice – Sztuka wobec Sacrum (Art and the Sacred), Lublin 2012
- Galeria Spokojna – Obecność malarstwa (The Presence of Painting), Warsaw 2012
- Galeria Działań – Wystawa pracowni w przestrzeni publicznej ASP Warszawa (Exhibition of the Studio of Art in Public Space, Academy of Fine Arts Warsaw), Warsaw 2012
- Galeria BWA Wrocław – post-competition exhibition of the 10th painting competition
- Galeria Sztuki w Legnicy – 20th Young Painters' Review "PROMOCJE 2010", Legnica 2010
- Freies Museum – Christmas Palm, Berlin 2009
- 1500 m do wynajęcia (1,500 m² for Rent) – installation, Warsaw 2009
