= Ujazdów Castle =

Castle in Warsaw, Poland

Ujazdów Castle Zamek Ujazdowski
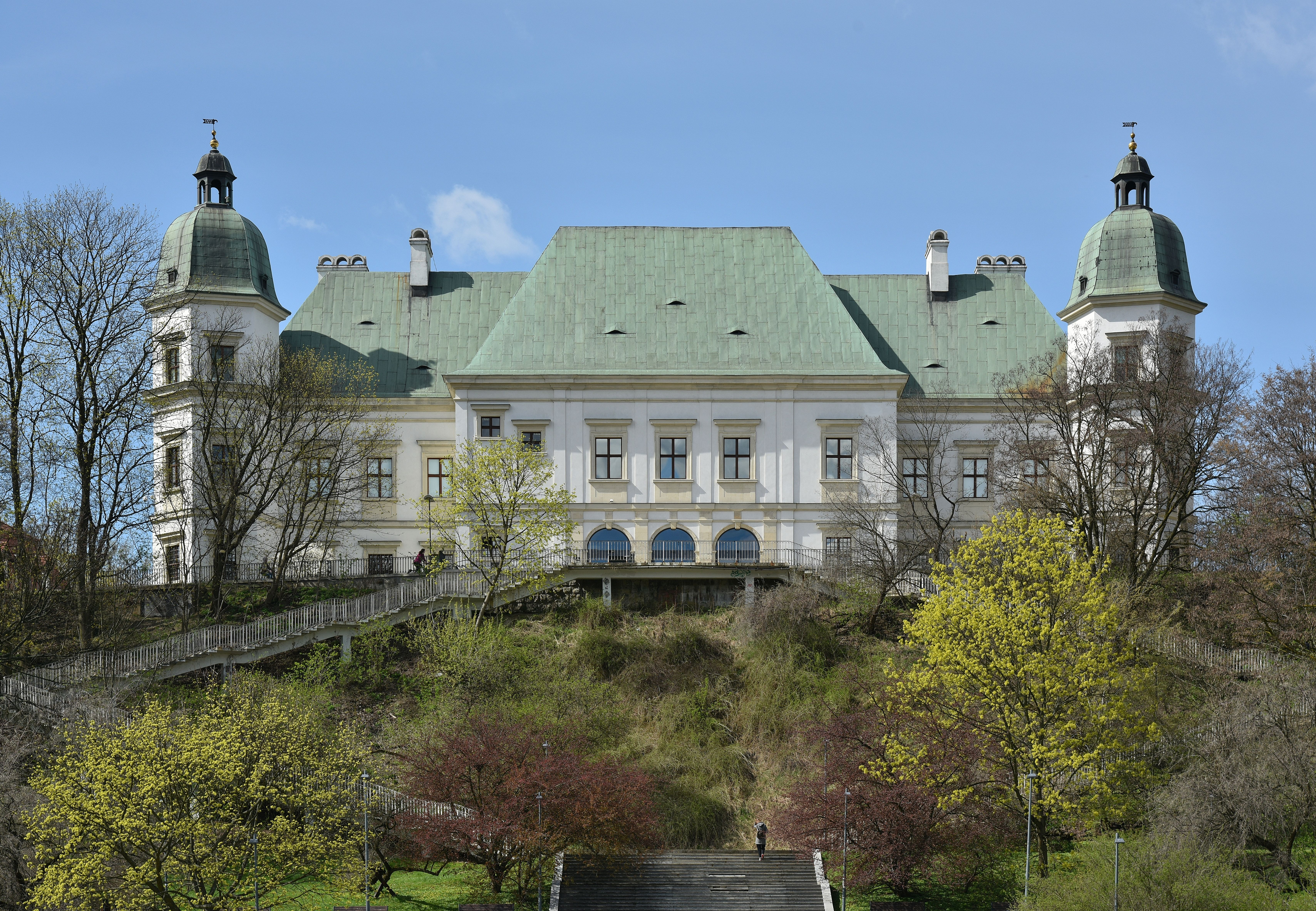
- Ujazdów Castle, seen from the Royal Canal
- Interactive map of the Ujazdów Castle; Zamek Ujazdowski area

General information
- Architectural style: Baroque-Neoclassical
- Location: Warsaw, Poland
- Coordinates: 52°13′10.16″N 21°01′51.92″E
- Completed: 1624, 1974
- Demolished: 1944
- Client: Sigismund III Vasa

Historic Monument of Poland
- Designated: 1994-09-08
- Part of: Warsaw – historic city center with the Royal Route and Wilanów
- Reference no.: M.P. 1994 nr 50 poz. 423

Ujazdów Castle ([ujazduv], Polish: Zamek Ujazdowski) is a castle in the historic Ujazdów district, between Ujazdów Park (Park Ujazdowski) and the Royal Baths Park (Łazienki Królewskie), in Warsaw, Poland.

Its beginnings date to the 13th century, and it was rebuilt several times. Like many structures in Warsaw, it sustained much damage in the Warsaw Uprising (1944). Reconstructed 30 years later (1974), it now houses Warsaw's Center for Contemporary Art.

== History ==
The first castle on the spot was erected by the Dukes of Masovia as early as the 13th century. However, in the following century their court was moved to the future Royal Castle in Warsaw, and the Ujazdów Castle fell into neglect. In the 16th century, a wooden manor was built there for Queen Bona Sforza. It was at Ujazdów Castle, on January 12, 1578, that Jan Kochanowski's blank-verse tragedy The Dismissal of the Greek Envoys received its premiere during the wedding of Jan Zamoyski and Krystyna Radziwiłł.

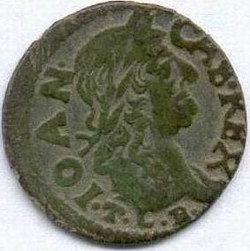
Obverse of boratynka coin minted at Ujazdów Castle, featuring profile of King John II Casimir.

The ruins of the castle of the Mazovian princes were then incorporated into a new fortified manor built by King Sigismund III Vasa for his son, future King Władysław IV Vasa. However, there is little evidence that the residence was ever used by the young prince, who spent much of his youth either at his father's court. According to Adam Jarzębski's "Short Description of Warsaw" from 1643, the entrance to the Ujazdów Castle was adorned with four marble lions ("I lwy cztery generalne, Między nimi, naturalne, Właśnie żywe wyrobione, A z marmuru są zrobione; Nie odlewane to rzeczy, Mistrzowską robotą grzeczy"). Between 1659 and 1665, the building housed the mint of Titus Livius Boratini, who there struck his famous boratynka, a type of copper coin.

Again neglected, in 1674 the castle was bought by Stanisław Herakliusz Lubomirski and then rented to King Augustus II, who ordered the construction there of a new royal residence. The castle, incorporating much of the earlier constructions on the site, was built by Tylman of Gameren, a notable 17th-century architect and engineer. The gardens surrounding the castle, later divided into two separate parks, were refurbished. About that time the Łazienki Eremity and Łazienki Palace were built.

The castle's design was further modified by King Stanisław II August, who in 1764 commissioned Jakub Fontana, Dominik Merlini, Jean-Baptiste Pillement and Efraim Schroeger to refurbish it. The eastern and western façades were made taller by the addition of a second floor, while the post-Gameren outbuildings were also rebuilt to the height of the main building, thus creating a large courtyard. About that time, the castle was also included in the so-called Stanislavian Axis, a line of parks and palaces planned in the southern outskirts of Warsaw much like the Saxon Axis in the city center. The palace's reconstruction was almost complete by 1784, when work was abandoned and the building donated to the Polish Army.

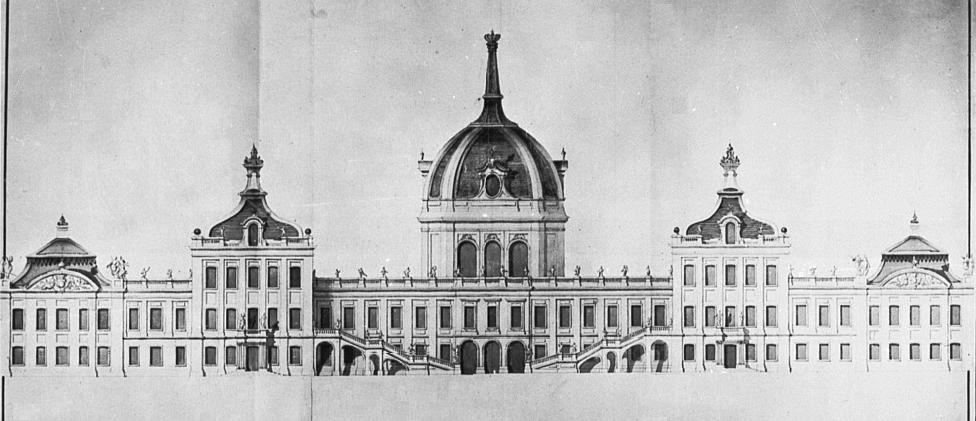
Proposed reconstruction by Carl Friedrich Pöppelmann, 1720

Consequently, between 1784 and 1789 the castle was yet again rebuilt, this time by Stanisław Zawadzki, who converted it into military barracks. The outbuildings were enlarged substantially. Since that time the building housed the Lithuanian Foot Guard Regiment and the 10th Foot Regiment. During the Kościuszko Uprising the castle was the main centre of conscription for the 20th Foot Regiment. After the Partitions of Poland, during the Prussian occupation of Warsaw, the building was abandoned. After the proclamation of the Duchy of Warsaw it was again restored to the army and was converted into a military hospital. However, the plans of converting it to the Central Military Hospital of the Polish Army were postponed by the Congress of Vienna which awarded the Congress Poland to Russia. On April 1, 1818 the hospital was officially opened. It had places for up to 1000 wounded soldiers. After the outbreak of the November Uprising the hospital was enlarged to 1250 beds and an additional annex with places for 600 was opened in the nearby Łazienki complex.

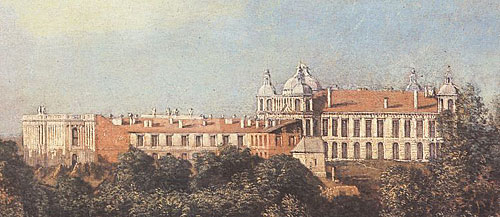
Ujazdów Castle about 1775, by Bernardo Bellotto ("Canaletto")

After the fall of the uprising, the Russian garrison of Warsaw was significantly strengthened, while the Polish military units were disbanded. A new central military hospital was built next to what became the Ujazdów Park and the castle became more of a barrack for the Russian military personnel. Around 1850 the outbuildings were again rebuilt by Jerzy Karol Völck, but were partially demolished 20 years afterwards. After the outbreak of World War I the building was again converted to a provisional hospital by the Russians. Captured by the German army in 1915, on April 10, 1917 it was transferred to the Polish Legions and became the main military hospital for Polish units fighting alongside the Central Powers (the more modern Ujazdów hospital located nearby remained a German-only hospital).

After Poland regained her independence in 1918, the internal design of the castle was yet again modified. Since the 1920s it housed several parts of the Warsaw NCO school. The main staircase was restored to its 18th-century representative design. An interesting feature of the staircase was a set of stone tablets placed there May 15, 1927, commemorating the names of all known Polish military medics who perished in wars between 1797 and 1920. Additional tablets commemorated Karol Kaczkowski, Zdzisław Lubaszewski and a sculpture by Edward Wittig commemorating all military medics. After the Polish Defensive War of 1939, the Red Cross organized a school for WIA soldiers. The castle was burnt out and damaged by the Germans following the Warsaw Uprising of 1944.

After the war, the building was to be rebuilt as the Central Military House. However, the works did not start as the walls of the castle were demolished by the Communist authorities of Poland in 1954. In 1975, however, the works on reconstruction of the castle to its 18th-century design were given a green light, and the project by Piotr Biegański was chosen. It houses Warsaw's Center for Contemporary Art (Centrum Sztuki Współczesnej) since 1985.

== Centre for Contemporary Art ==
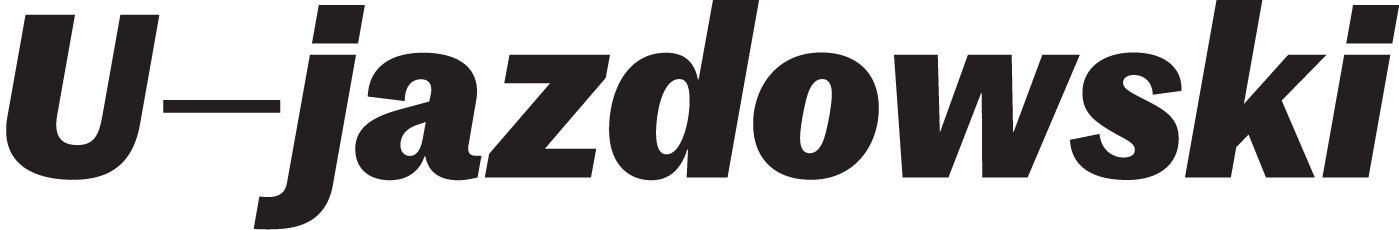
Logo of the Centre for Contemporary Art

The castle houses the Centre for Contemporary Art, with its collections and temporary exhibitions, concerts and educational workshops. The Centre has organized over 600 exhibitions since 1990. From 2010 to 2016, the Centre's director was an Italian, Fabio Cavallucci.

In 2017, Piotr Bernatowicz was appointed director by the Polish culture minister Piotr Glinski, a member of the Law and Justice Party. In an email interview to the New York Times, Bernatowicz said that the Polish art world is, in his words, "dominated by a left-wing, precisely neo-Marxist ideology... Artists who do not adopt this ideology are marginalized". The article further said that "Mr. Bernatowicz wants to change that and promote artists who have other views: conservative, patriotic, pro-family. His plans are transforming the museum into the latest battleground in Poland's culture wars, which pit liberals against the governing populist Law and Justice Party, as well as other conservative groups."

Ujazdów Castle has exhibited numerous artists, including:

- Magdalena Abakanowicz
- Paweł Althamer
- Eric Andersen
- Janusz Bałdyga
- Mirosław Bałka
- Wojciech Bąkowski
- Krzysztof Bednarski
- Jerzy Bereś
- Christian Boltanski
- Włodzimierz Borowski
- Bermet Borubaeva
- George Brecht
- Wojciech Bruszewski
- Tomasz Ciecierski
- Matt Collishaw
- Atilla Csorgo
- Zbigniew Dłubak
- Andrzej Dłużniewski
- Stanisław Dróżdż
- Edward Dwurnik
- Stefan Gierowski
- Zbigniew Gostomski
- Maurycy Gomulicki
- Katarzyna Górna
- Izabella Gustowska
- Lynn Hershman
- Jenny Holzer
- IRWIN
- Zuzanna Janin
- Piotr Jaros
- Zdzisław Jurkiewicz
- Koji Kamoji
- Ilya Kabakov
- Jerzy Kałucki
- Marek Kijewski
- Joseph Kosuth
- Piotr Kowalski
- Jarosław Kozłowski
- Katarzyna Kozyra
- Edward Krasiński
- Barbara Kruger
- Zofia Kulik
- Oleg Kulik
- Paweł Kwiek
- Natalia LL
- Dominik Lejman
- Norman Leto
- Zbigniew Libera
- Richard Long
- Hanna Łuczak
- Marcin Maciejowski
- Robert Maciejuk
- Jarosław Modzelewski
- Teresa Murak
- David Nash
- Roman Opałka
- Tony Oursler
- Dennis Oppenheim
- Michelangelo Pistoletto
- Wojciech Prażmowski
- Mariola Przyjemska
- Karol Radziszewski
- Joanna Rajkowska
- Józef Robakowski
- Ursula von Rydingsvard
- Wilhelm Sasnal
- Mikołaj Smoczyński
- Marek Sobczyk
- Daniel Spoerri
- Henryk Stażewski
- Andrzej Szewczyk
- Leon Tarasewicz
- Tomasz Vetulani
- Aleksandra Waliszewska
- Zbigniew Warpechowski
- Lawrence Weiner
- Emmet Williams
- Ryszard Winiarski
- Krzysztof Wodiczko
- Krzysztof Zarębski
- Artur Żmijewski
- Vasiliy Ryabchenko

== Gallery ==
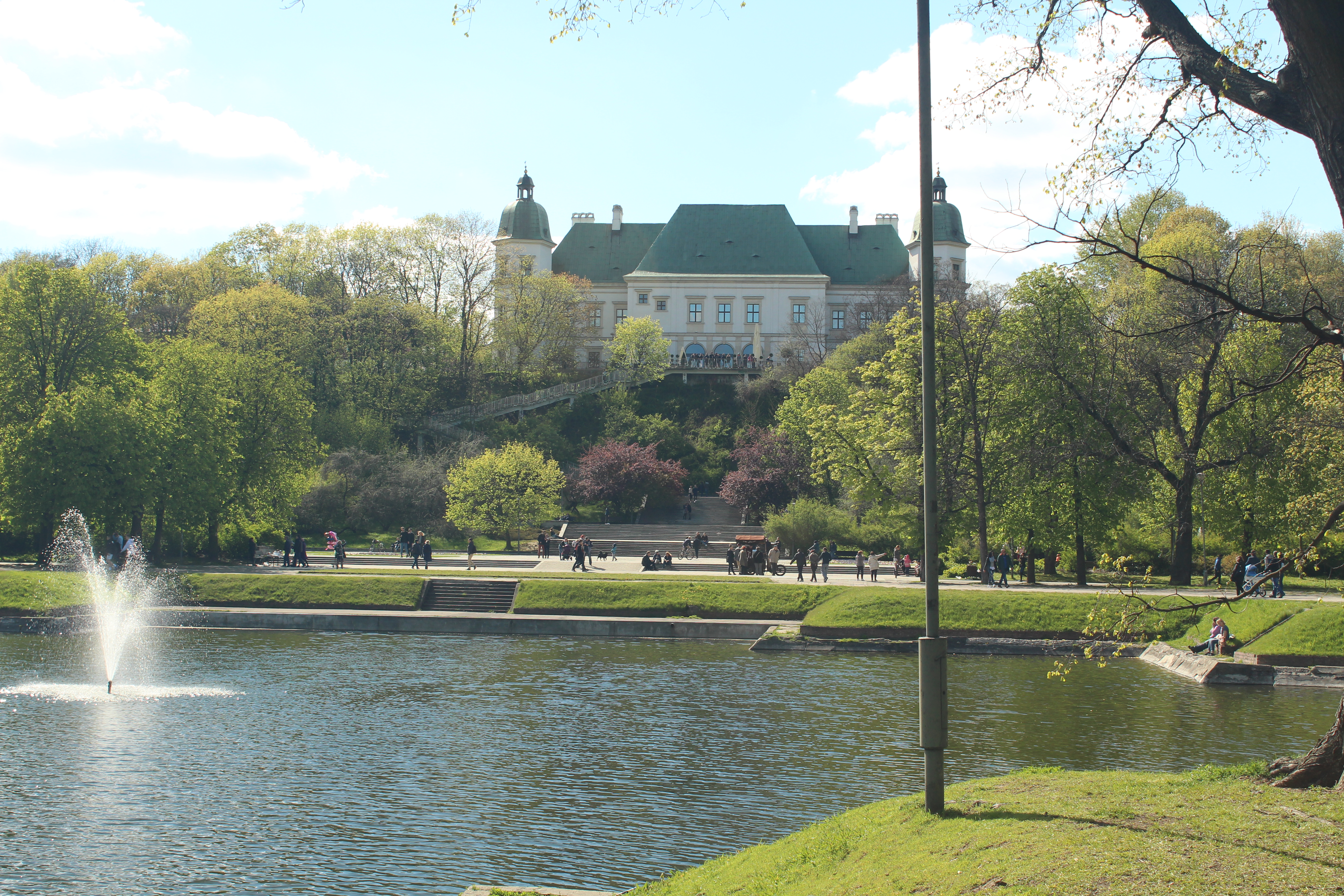
Ujazdów Castle

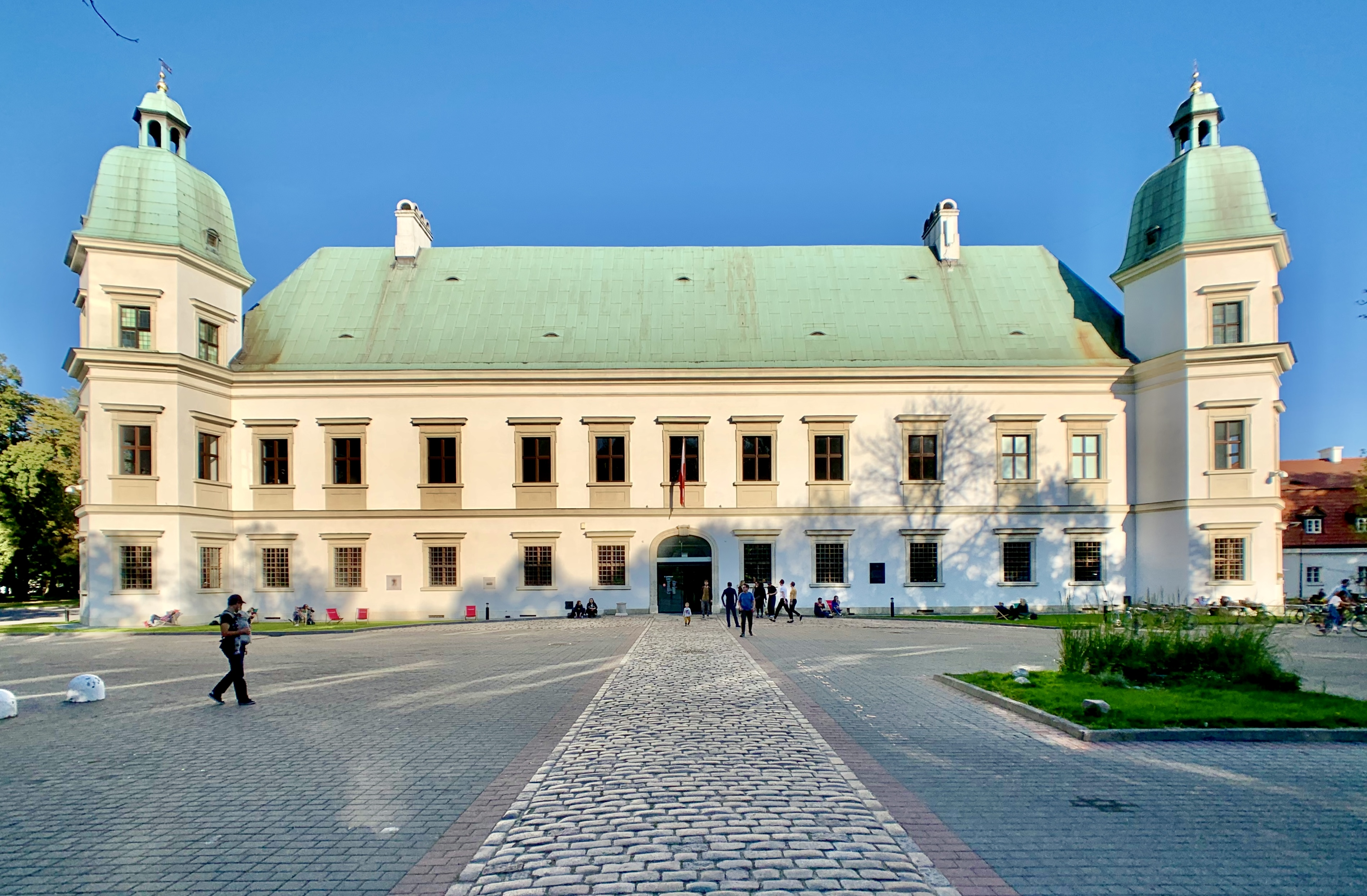
Entrance to Castle

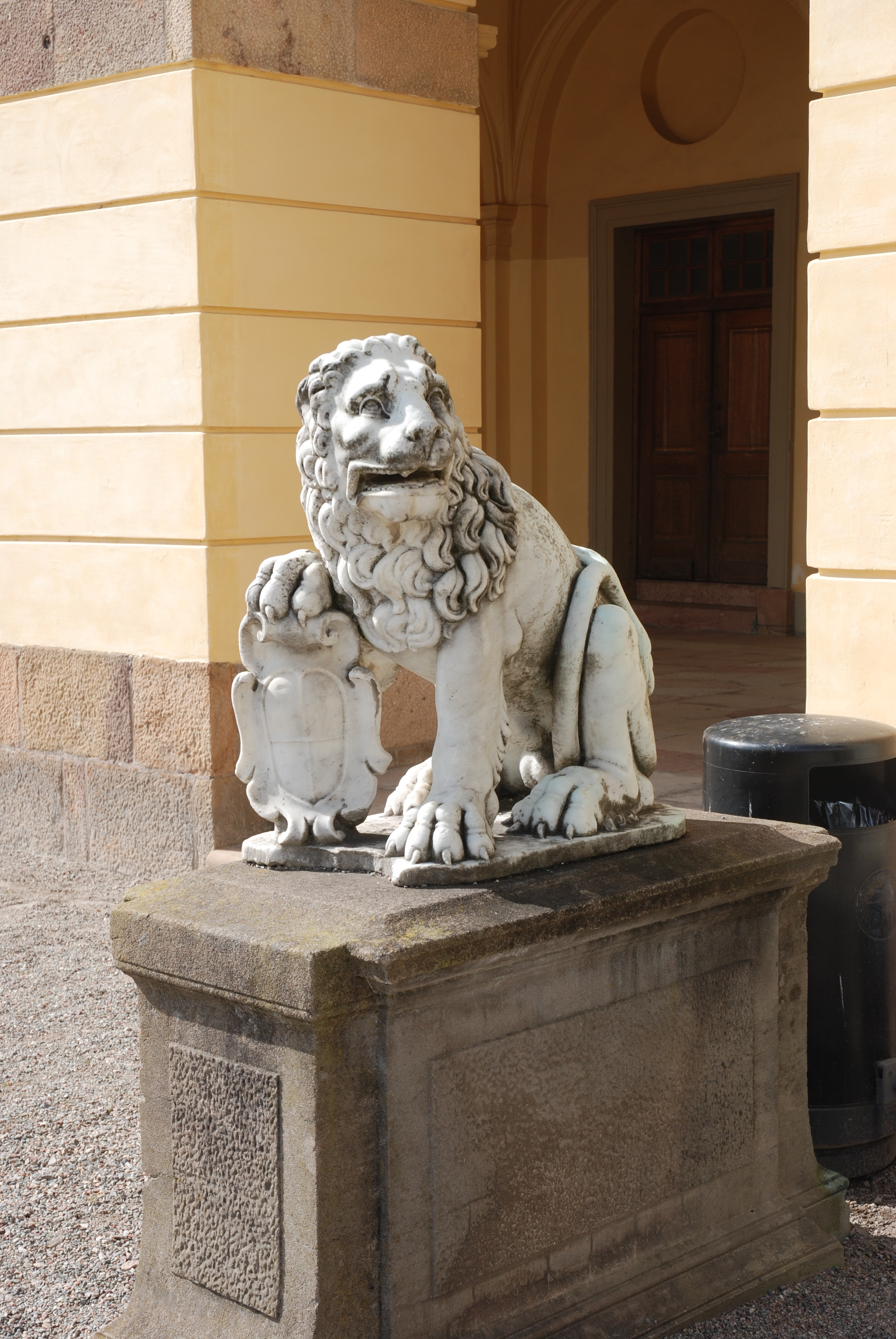
Marble lion from Ujazdów Castle by anonymous Italian scul-tor, 1630s, Drottningholm Palace

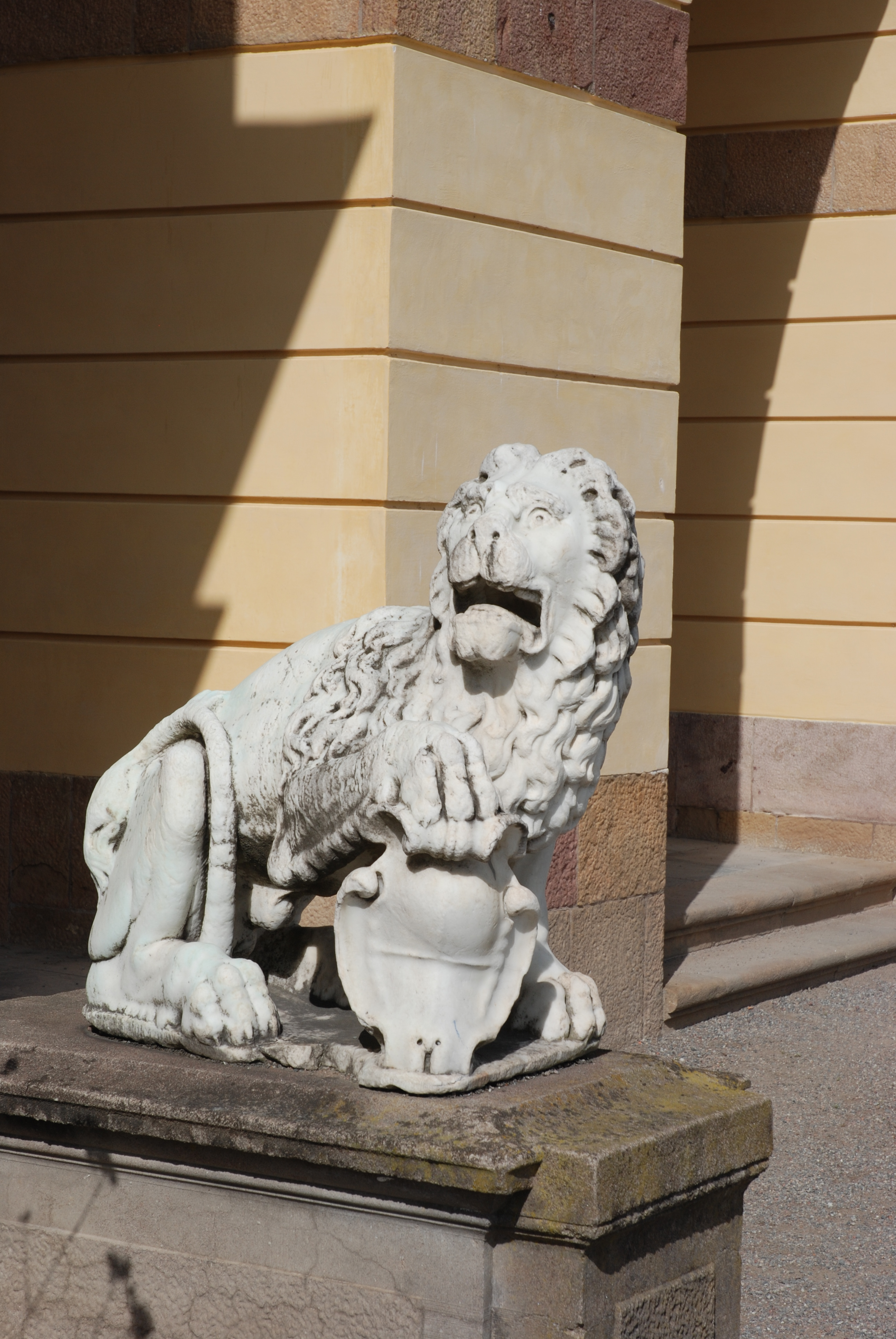
Marble lion from Ujazdów Castle by anonymous Italian sculptor, 1630s, Drottningholm Palace

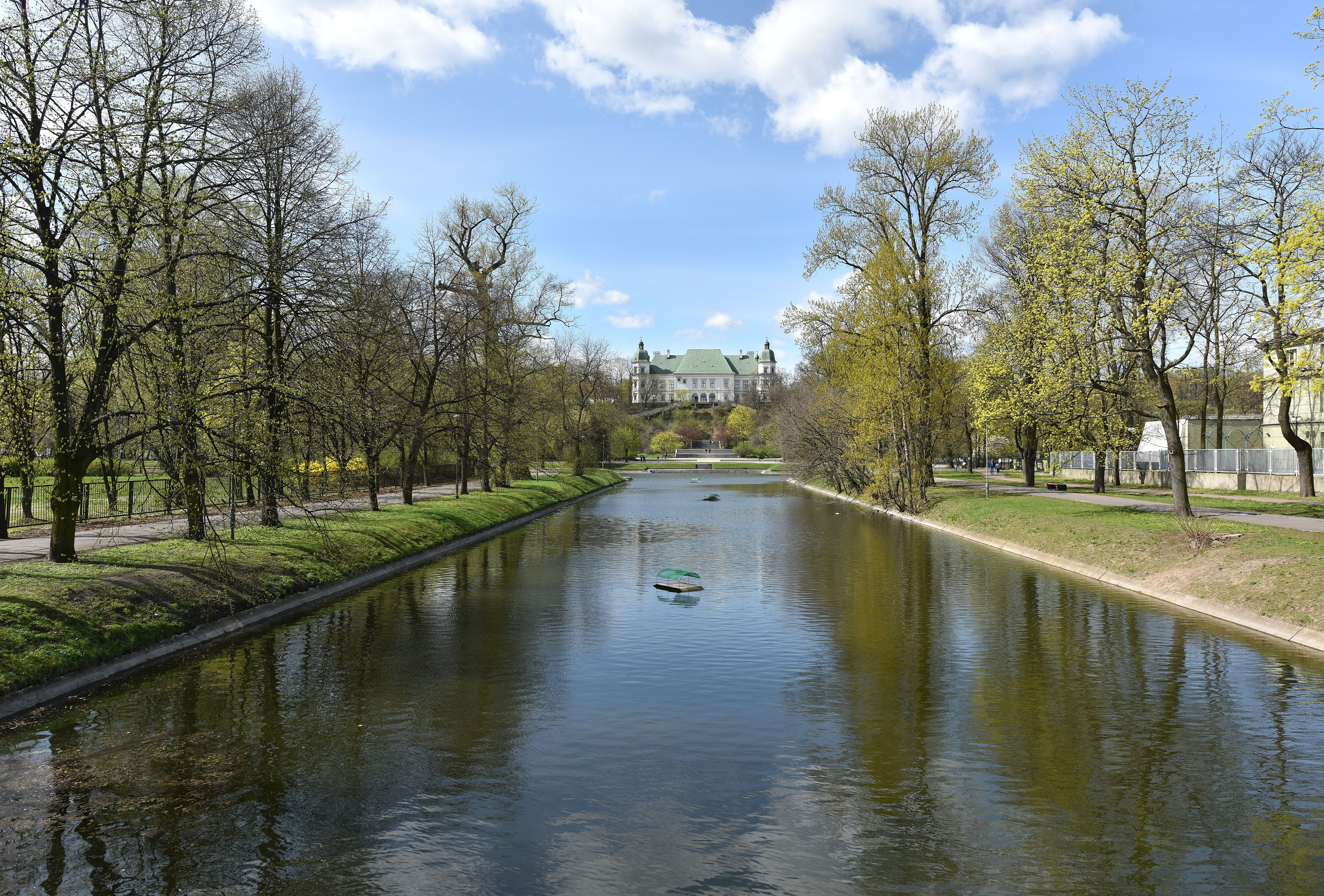
Piaseczyński Canal seen from Myśliwiecka Street

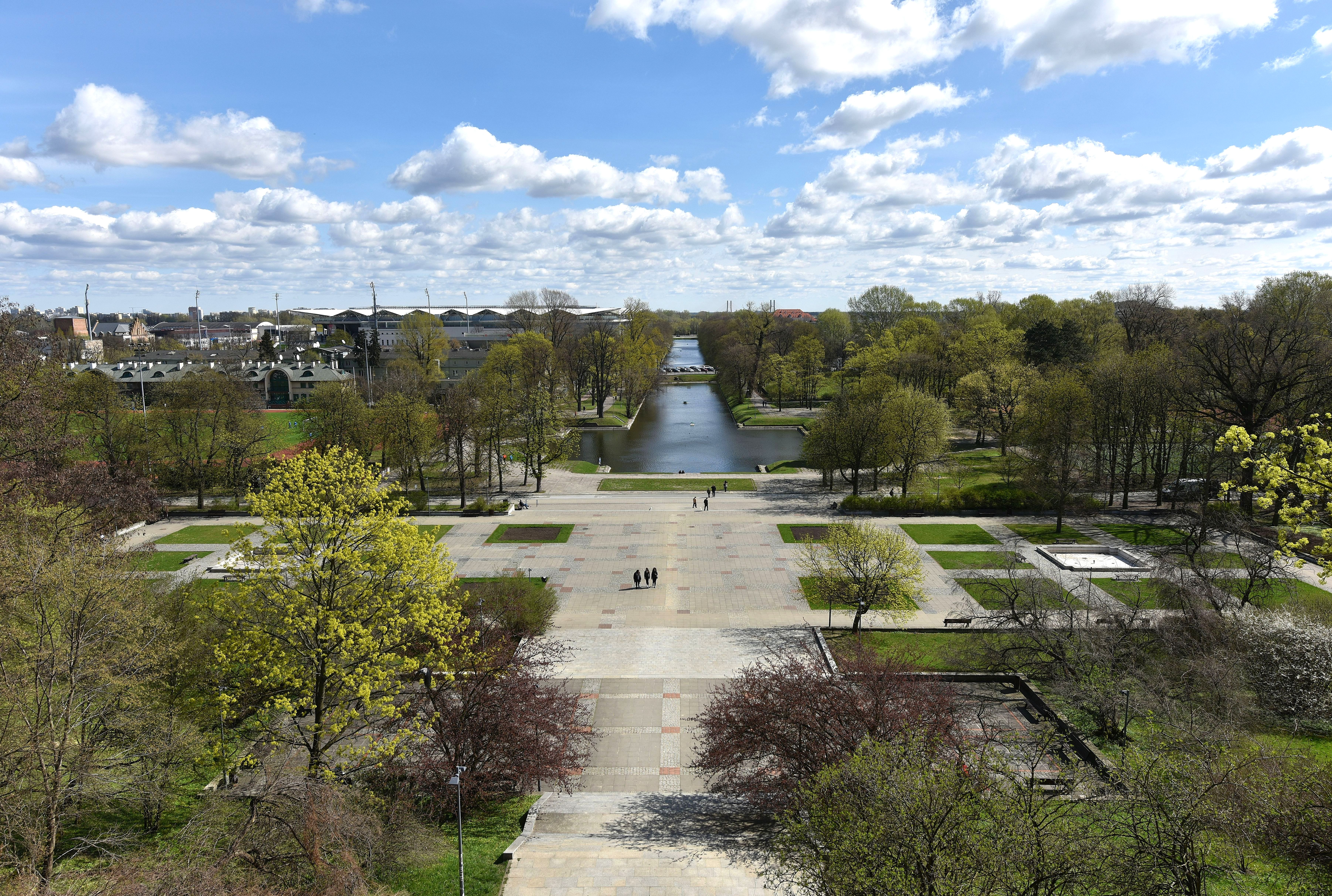
View of Royal Canal from Castle terraces

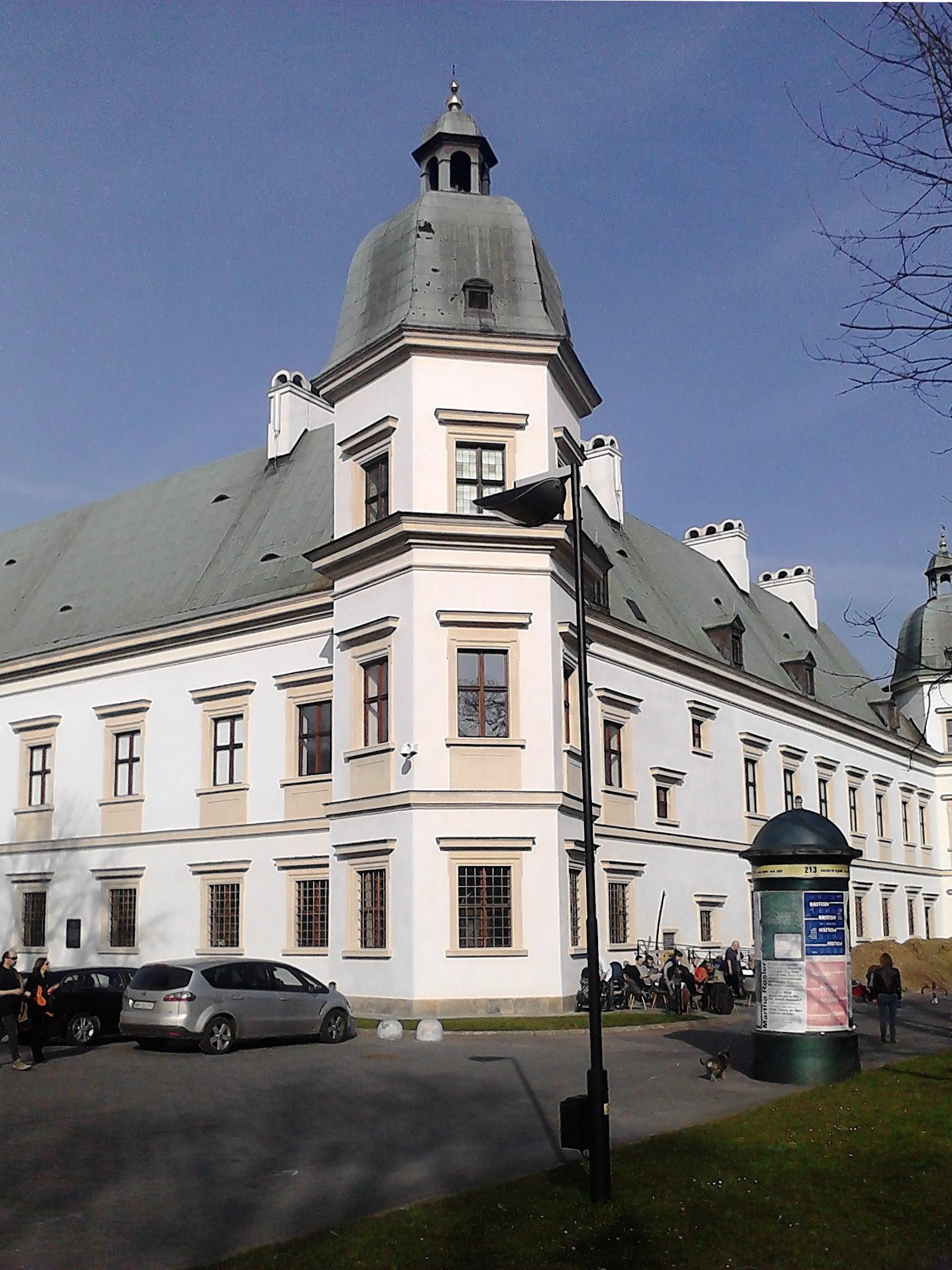
Castle tower

== See also ==
- Jan Kochanowski
- Royal Castle, Warsaw
- Castles in Poland
