= Alexander Hahn =

Alexander Hahn may refer to:

- Alexander Hahn (footballer) (born 1993), German footballer
- Alexander Hahn (artist) (born 1954), Swiss artist
