= Fingal's Cave =

Sea cave in Scotland

Coordinates: 56°26′02″N 6°20′10″W

- An Uaimh Bhinn
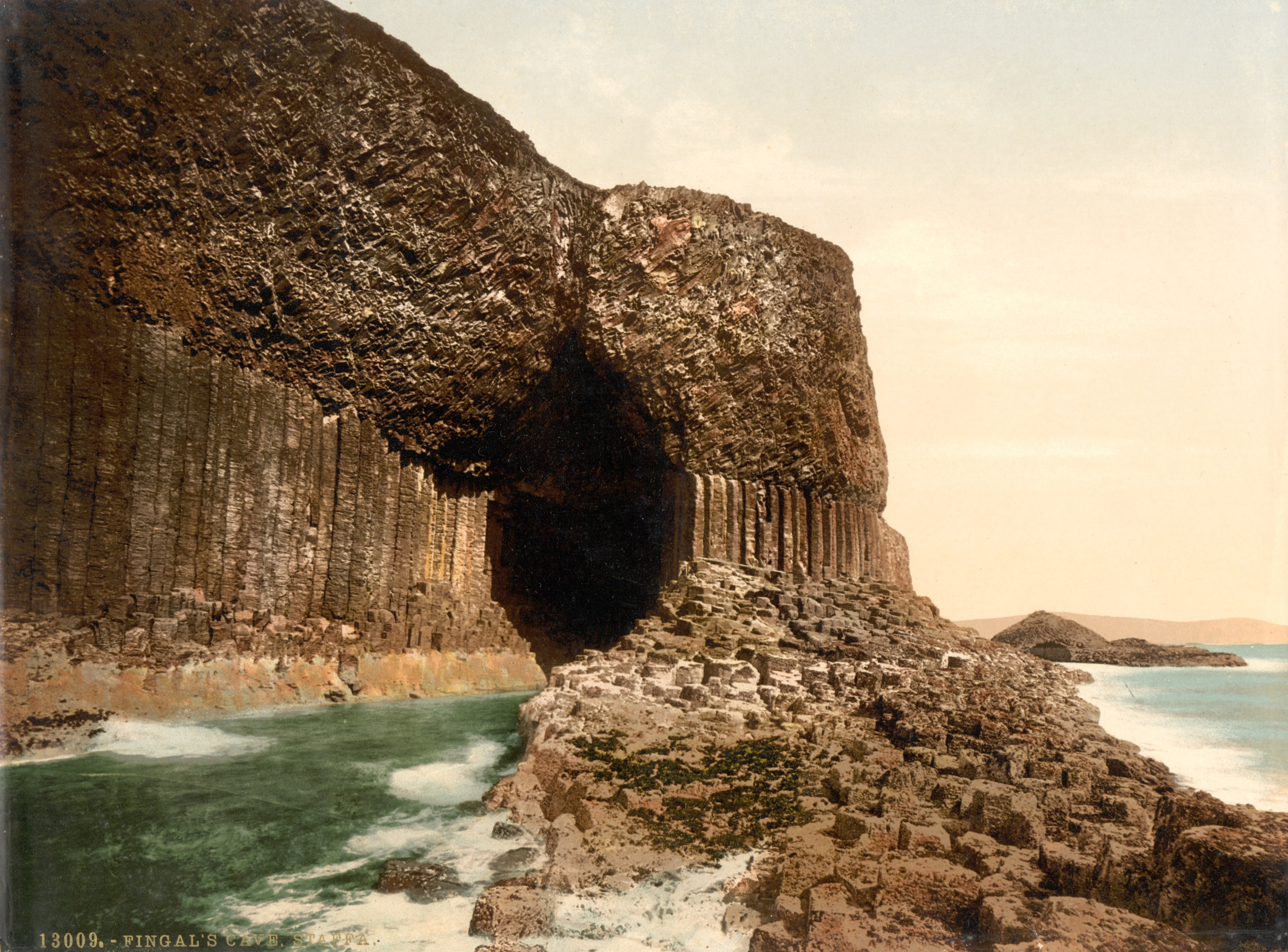
- Entrance to Fingal's Cave, 1900
- Interactive map of Fingal's Cave
- Location: Staffa, Scotland
- Discovery: 1772
- Geology: Paleocene basalt flow
- Entrances: One
- Hazards: Partially filled by the sea, slippery rocks
- Access: Public

Fingal's Cave is a sea cave on the uninhabited island of Staffa, in the Inner Hebrides of Scotland, known for its natural acoustics. The National Trust for Scotland owns the cave as part of a national nature reserve. It became known as Fingal's Cave after the eponymous hero of an epic poem by 18th-century Scots poet-historian James Macpherson.

== Formation ==
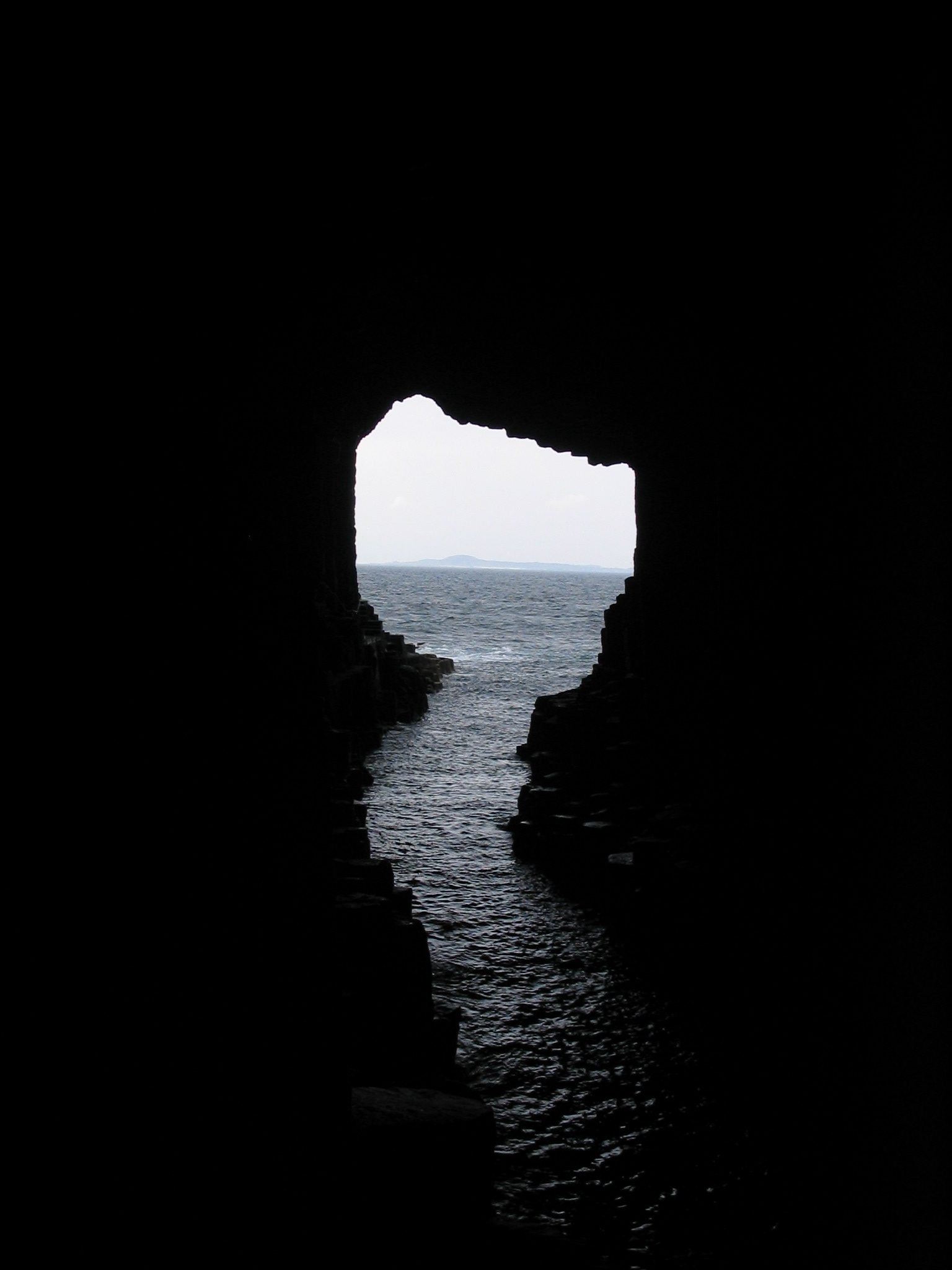
View from the depths of the cave with the island of Iona visible in the background, 2008

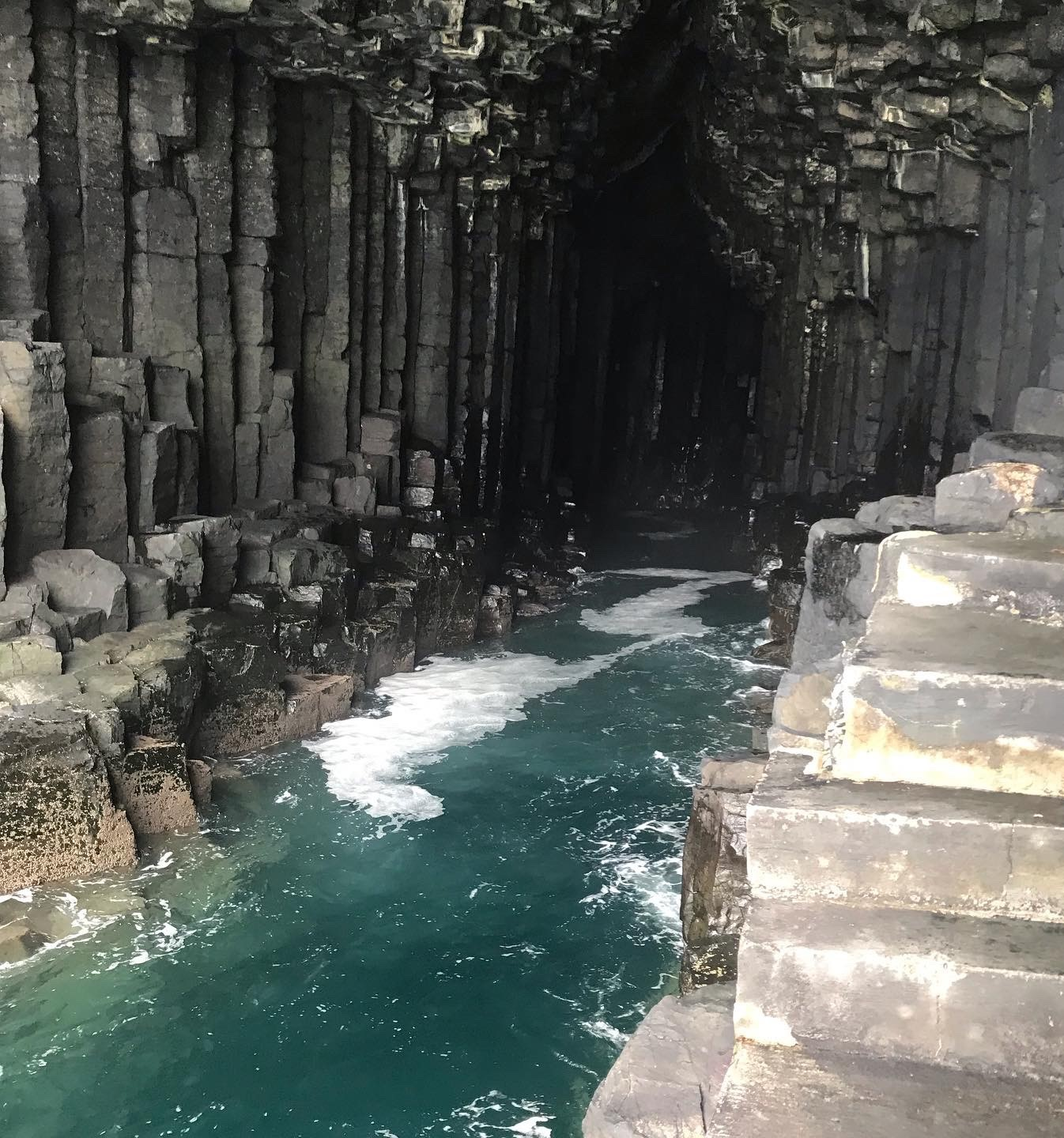
Basalt columns inside Fingal's Cave, 2022

Fingal's Cave is formed entirely from hexagonally jointed columnar basalt within a Paleocene lava flow and is similar in structure to both the Giant's Causeway in Northern Ireland and Ulva.

In these locations, cooling on the upper and lower surfaces of the solidified lava resulted in contraction and fracturing, starting in a blocky tetragonal pattern and transitioning to a regular hexagonal fracture pattern with fractures perpendicular to the cooling surfaces. As cooling continued these cracks gradually extended toward the centre of the flow, forming the long hexagonal columns we see in the wave-eroded cross-section today. Similar hexagonal fracture patterns are found in desiccation cracks in mud where contraction is due to loss of water instead of cooling.

== History ==
Fingal's Cave was originally part of the Ulva estate of the Clan MacQuarrie from an early date until 1777. The cave was brought to the attention of the English-speaking world by 18th-century naturalist Sir Joseph Banks in 1772.

It became known as Fingal's Cave after the eponymous hero of an epic poem by 18th-century Scots poet-historian James Macpherson. It formed part of his Ossian cycle of poems claimed to have been based on old Scottish Gaelic poems. In Irish mythology, the hero Fingal is known as Fionn mac Cumhaill, and it is suggested that Macpherson rendered the name as Fingal (meaning "white stranger") through a misunderstanding of the name which in old Gaelic would appear as "Finn". The legend of the Giant's Causeway has Finn (or Fionn) building the causeway between Ireland and Scotland.

== Sightseeing ==
The cave has a large arched entrance and is filled by the sea. Several sightseeing cruises organised from April to September by local companies pass the entrance to the cave. In calm conditions, one can land at the island's landing place (as some of these cruises permit) and walk the short distance to the cave, where a row of fractured columns forms a walkway just above high-water level permitting exploration on foot. From the inside, the entrance seems to frame the island of Iona across the water.

== In art and literature ==
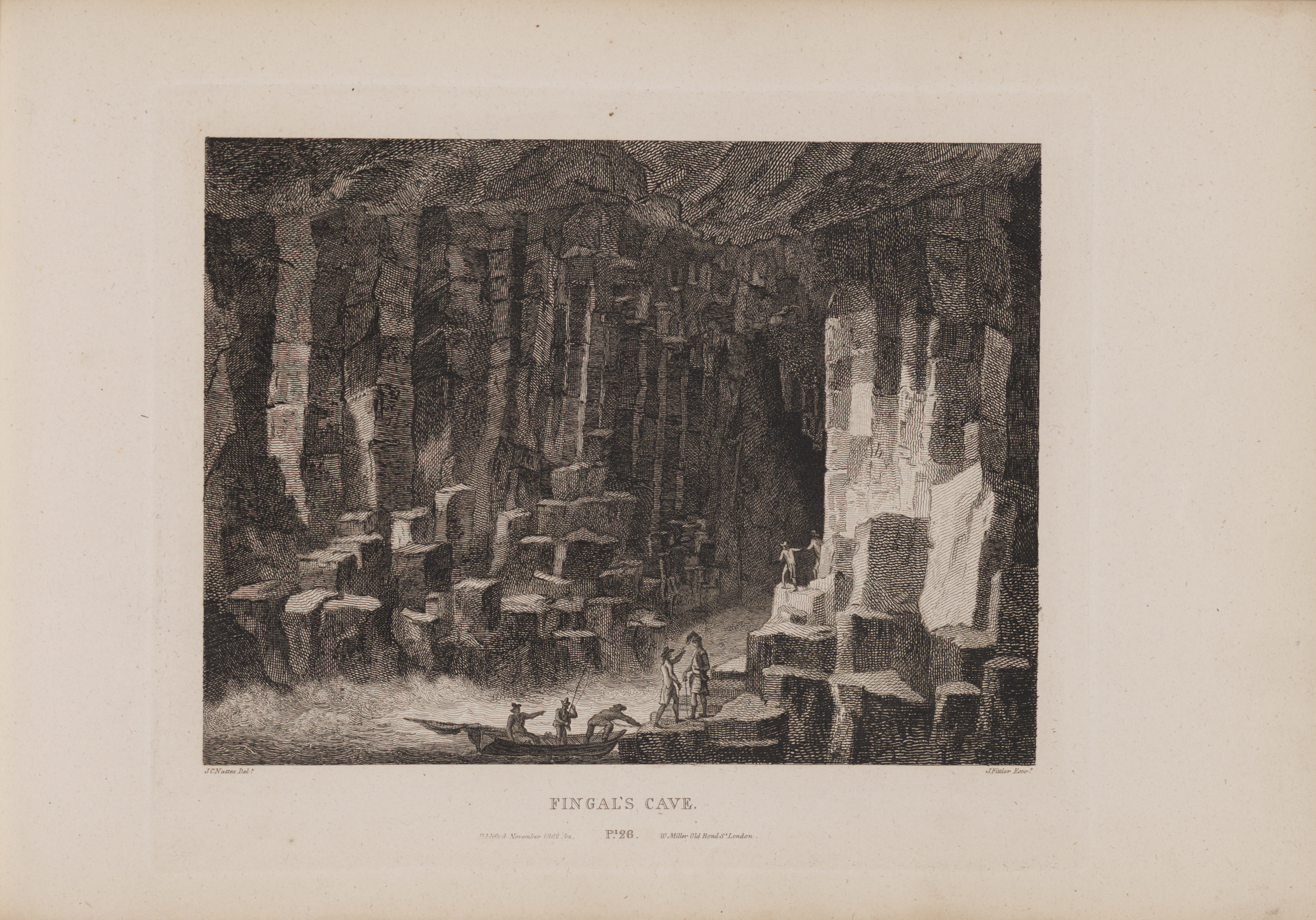
Engraving of Fingal's Cave by James Fittler in Scotia Depicta, 1804.

Romantic composer Felix Mendelssohn visited in 1829 and wrote an overture, The Hebrides, Op. 26, (also known as Fingal's Cave Overture), and was said to be inspired by the weird echoes in the cave. Mendelssohn's overture popularized the cave as a tourist destination. Other famous 19th-century visitors included author Jules Verne, who used it in his book Le Rayon Vert (The Green Ray), and mentions it in the novels Journey to the Center of the Earth and The Mysterious Island. Poets William Wordsworth, John Keats, and Alfred, Lord Tennyson and Romantic artist J. M. W. Turner, who painted Staffa, Fingal's Cave in 1832 also made the trip. In 1860 the German novelist Theodor Fontane visited the cave and described it in his travel report Jenseit des Tweed (Beyond the Tweed, Pictures and Letters from Scotland), Queen Victoria also made the trip.

The 19th century Austro-Hungarian guitarist and composer Johann Kaspar Mertz included a piece entitled Fingals-Höhle in his set of character pieces for guitar Bardenklänge.

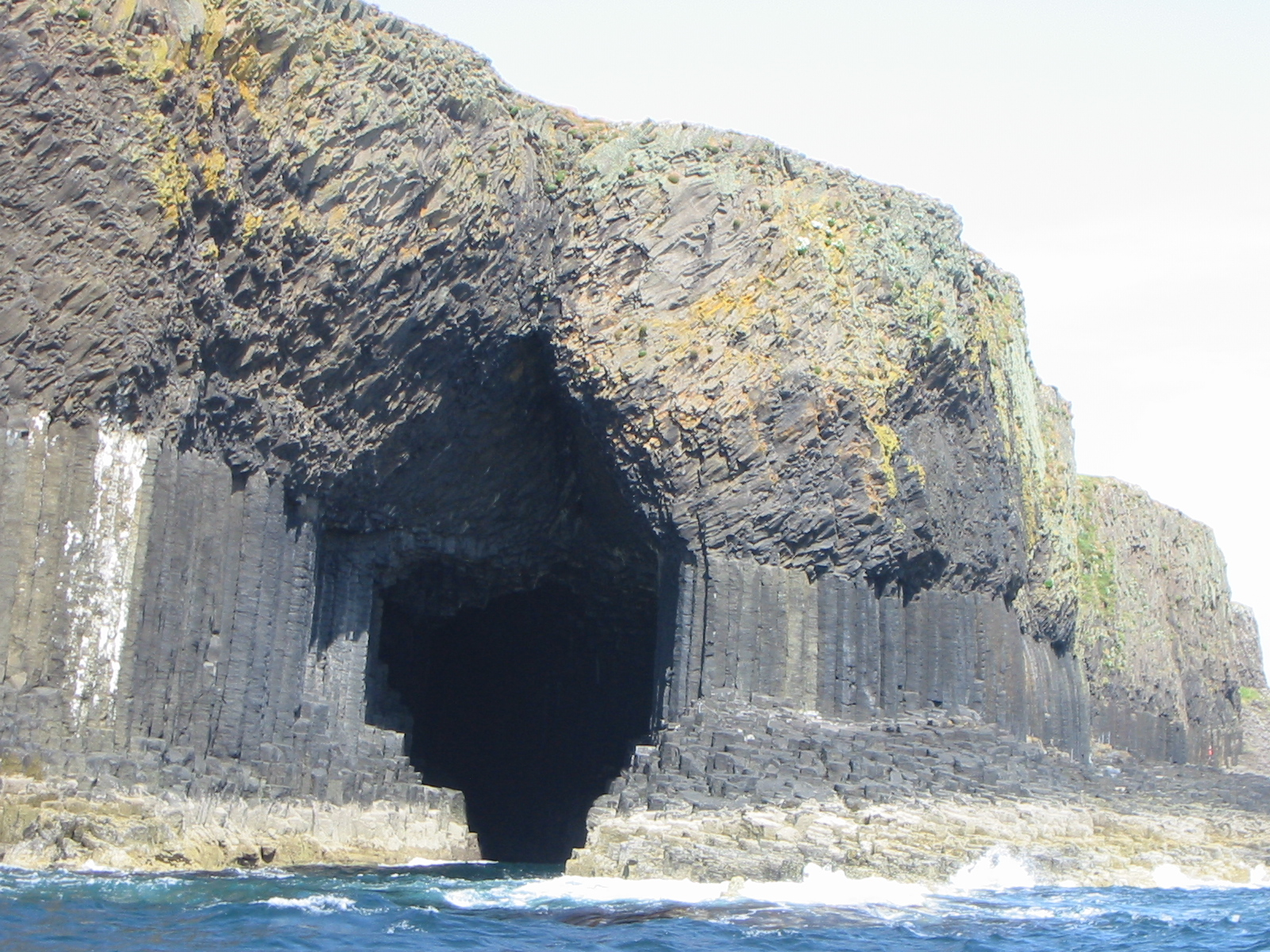
Entrance to Fingal's cave, 2004

The playwright August Strindberg also set scenes from his play A Dream Play in a place called "Fingal's Grotta". Scots novelist Sir Walter Scott described Fingal's Cave as "one of the most extraordinary places I ever beheld. It exceeded, in my mind, every description I had heard of it… composed entirely of basaltic pillars as high as the roof of a cathedral, and running deep into the rock, eternally swept by a deep and swelling sea, and paved, as it were, with ruddy marble, [it] baffles all description."

Artist Matthew Barney used the cave along with the Giant's Causeway for the opening and closing scenes of his art film, Cremaster 3. In 2008, the video artist Richard Ashrowan spent several days recording the interior of Fingal's Cave for an exhibition at the Foksal Gallery in Poland.

One of Pink Floyd's early songs bears this location's name. This instrumental was written for the film Zabriskie Point, but not used.

Lloyd House at Caltech has a hallway ("alley") named Fingal's Cave.

The Alistair MacLean novel-based film, When Eight Bells Toll, starring Anthony Hopkins, was filmed there.

It is likely that the township of Fingal, Tasmania was named after Macpherson's poetry rather than the cave itself.

== Dimensions ==
- Wood-Nuttall Encyclopaedia, 1907: 69 m (227 ft) deep, 20 m (66 ft) high.
- National Public Radio, 2005: 45 m (150 ft) deep; 22 m (72 ft) high.
- Show Caves of the World: 85 m (279 ft) deep; 23 m (75 ft) high.

== See also ==
- List of places with columnar jointed volcanics
