= Foksal Gallery =

Gallery in Warsaw, Poland

Coordinates: 52°14′4″N 21°1′25″E

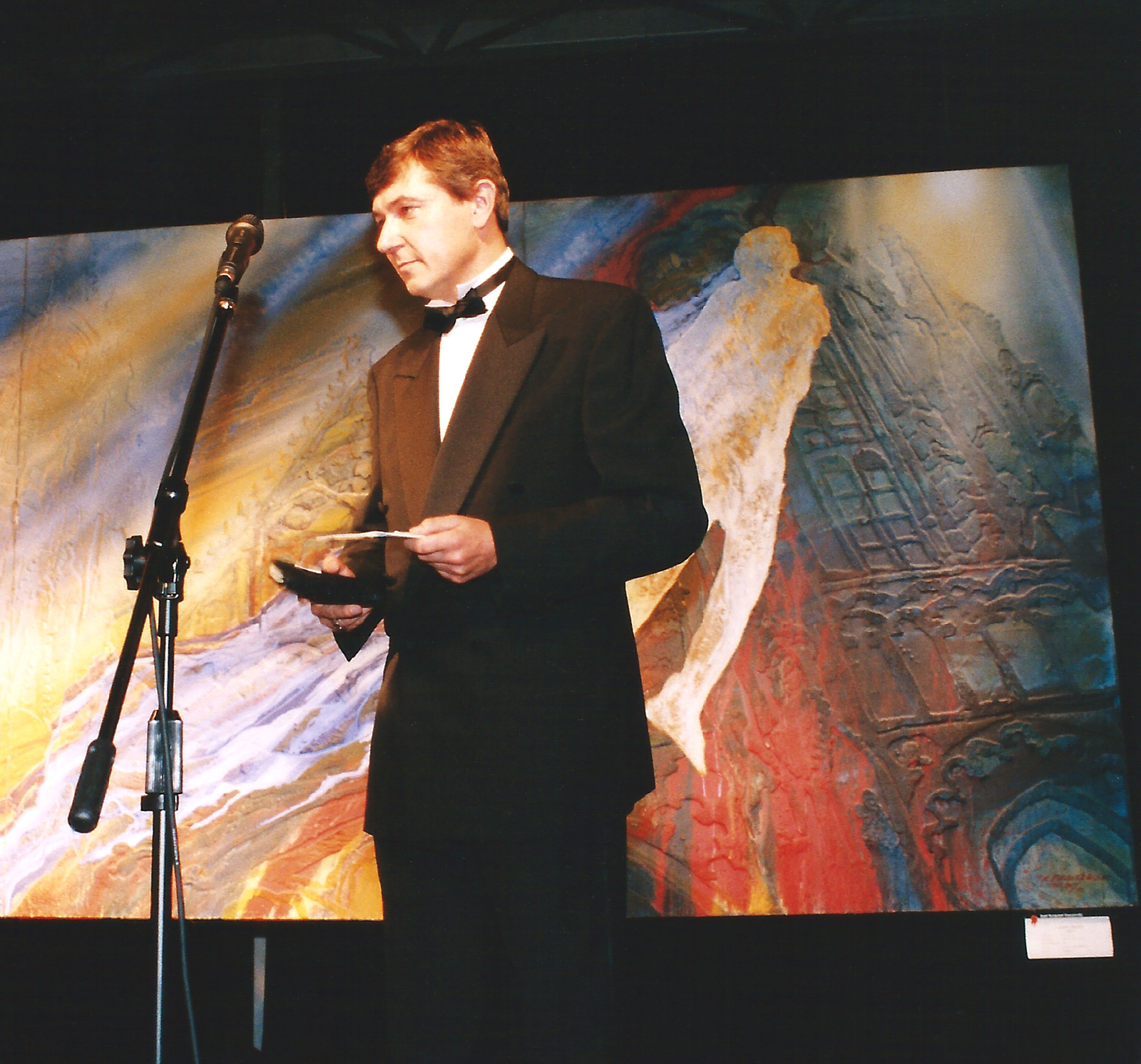
Artist Józef Krzysztof Oraczewski at a vernissage event at Galeria Foksal, 1996.

The Foksal Gallery or Galeria Foksal is a non-commercial gallery space in Warsaw, Poland established in 1966, that shows works by contemporary avant-garde artists.

== History ==
The Foksal Gallery was founded in 1966 by a group of Polish art critics and artists, which included one of the founder members of the Polish Constructivist Group of the 1920s. From the outset the gallery's activities were underpinned by the strong philosophical basis embodied within the essay "Wprowadzenie do ogolnej Teorii Miejsca (Introduction to the general Theory of Place)" (1966). The critics associated with the Foksal Gallery; Anka Ptaszkowska, Mariusz Tchorek, Wiesław Borowski established the gallery as a "place, a sudden gap in the utilitarian way of world comprehension", in which art could exist without reference to context or history, a place exempt from outside rules or influence. They also proposed that the venue, "as the most authentic theme of the event", was now to become the actual subject. In addition to the aforementioned critics, the artist-founders at the Foksal included Tadeusz Kantor, Roman Owidzkiego, Edward Krasinski (whose signature blue Scotch tape intervention still winds its way through the gallery's ancillary spaces), Zbigniew Gostomski and Henryk Stażewski.

Zbigniew Gostomski (b. 1932), a founder artist of the Foksal Gallery, held the inaugural exhibition on 1 April 1966 showing works of his Optical Objects series. Tadeusz Kantor and Wlodzimierz Borowski were involved in actions at the gallery during the 60's. The Foksal succeeded in showing work of an avant-garde nature throughout the communist era, apart from a short period of martial law, during which it was 'closed for renovation'. For its first twenty years the Foksal Gallery functioned within the state controlled system, nonetheless succeeding in developing an internationally significant programme of contemporary art under the Directorship of Wieslaw Borowski in co-operation with Andrzej Turowski. Milada Ślizińska also curated a series of exhibitions. Jaromir Jedlinski (previously of the Museum Sztuki in Łódź), was the gallery's Director from July 2006 until August 2008. Nowadays the gallery is run by the younger generation of curators: Katarzyna Krysiak (Artistic Director/Head Curator), Lech Stangret and Monika Weychert Waluszko.

The gallery acted under the auspices of the Laboratory of Arts Plastycznych (PSP) until 1982, then under SBWA until 2001. At present, it remains government funded under the Mazovia Region Centre For Culture and Art (MCKiS).

The Foksal Gallery has for many years been one of the most influential art galleries in Poland, with shows by many internationally acclaimed artists including Christian Boltanski, Henryk Stażewski, Joseph Beuys, Royden Rabinowitch, Anselm Kiefer, Luc Tuymans, Bill Viola, Tadeusz Kantor, Ian Hamilton Finlay, Koji Kamoji, Leon Tarasewicz, Douglas Gordon, Matthew Barney, Marek Chlanda and Victor Burgin among many other notable names.

In 1997 the Foksal Gallery Foundation was formed to widen the scope of activities of the gallery. Initially based within the Foksal Gallery, the Foksal Gallery Foundation moved out in 2001 and now operates, somewhat controversially (because of the historic "Foksal" brand usage among others), as an independent and commercial entity, that has nothing to do with the Foksal Gallery activities whatsoever.

== Name and Location ==
The gallery is named after Foksal, the name of the street at the end of which it can be found. 'Foksal' is said to be a Polish corruption of 'Vauxhall' the name given to the street when the Foksal park area was created in the nineteenth century by a merchant who had been inspired by the atmosphere of London's Vauxhall Pleasure Gardens in Vauxhall.

== Artists ==
Artists shown at the gallery include:

- Paweł Althamer
- Giovanni Anselmo
- Richard Ashrowan
- Mirosław Bałka
- Matthew Barney
- Robert Barry
- Johanna Bartl
- Krzysztof M. Bednarski
- Anna Beller
- Jerzy Bereś
- Joseph Beuys
- Christian Boltanski
- Włodzimierz Borowski
- Daniel Buren
- Victor Burgin
- Alan Charlton
- Marek Chlanda
- Stanisław Cichowicz
- Tomasz Ciecierski
- Tony Cragg
- Michael Craig-Martin
- Jonas Dahlberg
- Małgorzata Dawidek Gryglicka
- Peter Downsbrough
- Stanisław Dróżdż
- Druga Grupa (Jacek Stokłosa, Lesław Janicki, Wacław Janicki)
- Lars Englund
- Diana Fiedler
- Joel Fisher
- Peter Flemming
- Jarosław Fliciński
- Tom Friedman
- Wojciech Gilewicz
- Douglas Gordon
- Zbigniew Gostomski
- Alexander Hahn
- Alexander Hamilton
- Ian Hamilton Finlay
- John Hiliard
- Susan Hiller
- Alain Jacquet
- Rafał Jakubowicz
- Zuzanna Janin
- Katarzyna Józefowicz
- Koji Kamoji
- Tadeusz Kantor
- Niek Kemps
- Anselm Kiefer
- Job Koelewijn
- Eustachy Kossakowski
- Jarosław Kozłowski
- Edward Krasiński
- Piotr Lutyński
- Dawid Mach
- Robert Maciejuk
- Tom Marioni
- Angelika Markul
- Ian McKeever
- Annette Messager
- Deimantas Narkevičius
- Edward Narkiewicz
- Anna Niesterowicz
- Marzena Nowak
- Jerzy Nowosielski
- Roman Opałka
- Achille Perilli
- Peter Pommerer
- Joanna Przybyła
- Royden Rabinowitch
- Arnulf Rainer
- Wilhelm Sasnal
- Jadwiga Sawicka
- Gregor Schneider
- Roman Signer
- Roman Siwulak
- Mikołaj Smoczyński
- Maria Stangret Kantor
- Henryk Stażewski
- Gerda Steiner
- ((Marek Szczesny))
- Andrzej Szewczyk
- Leon Tarasewicz
- Zygmunt Targowski
- Tomasz Tatarczyk
- Luc Tuymans
- Piotr Uklański
- Ben Vautier
- Bernar Venet
- Bill Viola
- Lawrence Weiner
- Franz West
- Krzysztof Wodiczko
- Włodzimierz Jan Zakrzewski
- Artur Żmijewski
