= Rafał Jakubowicz =

Rafał Jakubowicz (born 1974), is a visual artist and art critic.

== Education ==
He studied at the Academy of Fine Arts in Poznań, at the Faculty of Artistic Education (1999) and the Faculty of Painting, Graphics and Sculpture (2000). He is currently a PhD (doctorate) student at the Institute Of Art History at the Adam Mickiewicz University in Poznań

== Art ==
Member of artistic group Wunderteam since 2002. He has published articles in a number of magazines, journals, exhibition catalogues and websites, including „Czas Kultury”, „Orońsko. Kwartalnik Rzeźby”, „Gazeta malarzy i poetów”, „Tygodnik Powszechny”, „Format”, „Opcje”, „Exit”, „Odra”, „Kresy”, „Dyskurs”, „ARTeon”, „Umělec” (Praha), „Magazyn Sztuki”, „Rasta”. Member of AICA (International Association of Art Critics) since 2005.

In his artistic work Rafał Jakubowicz uses various media. He paints pictures, makes installations, videos, photos. He exhibits his works in galleries and makes projects in public space. He brings up the issues of widely interpreted memory; of preservation, superseding, continuation and disappearance of historical and visual reality. Jakubowicz's best-known work is Arbeitsdisziplin: a video in which a uniformed guard is walking behind a wire netting set in front of a massive factory with Volkswagen logo; a lightbox with the view of the factory emerging from behind a barbed wire, and postcards showing the same theme. Referring to Volkswagen's shameful role in Nazi Germany, he shows an oppressive side of this place, and tells about the levers of power which penetrate the reality and determine our everyday life. They exist in the society's subconscious, awaiting an opportunity to come to light in extreme conditions.

Jakubowicz points out the danger of forgetting and of the ignorance caused by it. It is particularly noticeable in his work Pływalnia (Swimming-pool) dedicated to a Poznań synagogue, which in 1940 was turned into a swimming-pool. Jakubowicz designed a postcard displaying a photo of the synagogue with a Hebrew sign meaning “swimming-pool” on one side, and a photograph of boys swimming in the pool on the other. The original character of the interior is meaningless to them. They do not know it. Unawareness, ignorance and the resulting passiveness, together with a lack of resistance, led throughout the history to the expansion of totalitarian regimes and irreversible modifications of reality. Jakubowicz emphasizes the importance of historical sense as well as of visual awareness, with either one's increase being made possible through art, which also enables spreading of knowledge, beyond the control of the authorities.

He lives and works in Poznań.

=== Exhibitions ===
2006 Pływalnia, individual exhibition (ind.exh.), Auschwitz Jewish Center, Oświęcim; Gabinet, ind.exh., Galeria Entropia, Wrocław; The Lost Whistle, ind.exh. Sekcja, Warszawa (z Yifat Lajst); Witajcie w mediach!, Królikarnia, Warszawa; Ulica Próżna 2006, Warszawa; Futuryzm Miast Przemysłowych, Łaźnia Nowa, Nowa Huta; Czechpoint, Galerie C2C, Praga, Czechy; 2005 Sztuka zabija, ind.exh., Galeria Pies, Poznań; MITTEL WEIß, ind.exh., Foksal Gallery, Warszawa; stoosiemdziesiąt i coś, ind.exh., CSW Warszawa; Randka w ciemno, Sector Reforma, Guadalajara, Meksyk; Futuryzm Miast Przemysłowych, Kunstverein Wolfsburg, Niemcy; 2004 FORMA, ind.exh., Foksal Gallery, Warszawa; SIGNAL BOX /NASTAWNIA, BWA Katowice, Za czerwonym horyzontem, CSW Warszawa; 2003 zugzwang, ind.exh., Galeria Wieża Ciśnień, Konin; Stan wojenny, ZOR Warszawa; 2002 OUT THERE, ind.exh., Galeria ON, Poznań; Arbeitsdisziplin, ind.exh., Squat Rozbrat, Poznań; dicke Luft, ind.exh., Galeria Entropia, Wrocław; 2000 reparation, ind.exh., Galeria AT, Poznań.
