= Richard Ashrowan =

Scottish artist

Lament, 2009, video stills, by Richard Ashrowan

Richard Ashrowan, (English, born 1966) is a moving image/video artist working in Scotland. He specializes in multi-screen moving image installations, relating to themes connected with natural landscapes.

== Biography ==
Ashrowan was born in 1966, in Essex, England. After training in Chinese Medicine he was a founder member of the charity Open Road, he played with an experimental ambient/techno band Shen in the early 1990s. From 2002 to 2007 he worked in partnership with Scottish artist Alexander Hamilton under the name 'Hamilton & Ashrowan'. The Threshold Artspace, a large and fully networked multi-media 30 screen digital canvas installation in Perth Concert Hall, was conceived by Hamilton & Ashrowan. Since 2007 Ashrowan has worked independently, creating works largely derived from locations in Scotland, including Fingal's Cave on Staffa and the Anglo-Scottish border. His works have been exhibited at the Foksal Gallery and Fabrycka Sztuki in Poland, the Brukenthal Museum and Casa Artelor in Romania, the Scottish National Portrait Gallery in Edinburgh, An Tobar in Tobermory, The Forest Gallery, Selkirk, the Ruskin Gallery in Cambridge, and the Threshold Artspace in Perth. Alongside his practice he is currently (2009) pursuing a postgraduate research project at Edinburgh College of Art. He lives and works in the Scottish Borders.

== Work ==
Ashrowan's work is in video installation, still photographic works on paper and written texts, based upon close observation of natural landscapes. His earlier work was strongly influenced by John Ruskin. In 2007 Hamilton & Ashrowan were commissioned by the Scottish National Portrait Gallery to make a series of moving-image portraits of Richard Demarco. In 2009 he produced a book of photographs of the border between England and Scotland. to accompany a solo exhibition of his film and photography installation 'Lament', exhibited in Romania. Ashrowan describes his work as a process of "honing down the overwhelming complexity of a given landscape place to find within it those images and movements in time that seem to hold the essence of a feeling, a vital intensity. Many of the images I create could be described as microcosms of place, emotion, time and memory."

== Exhibitions ==
Solo and Group exhibitions

2009
Lament / Fingal's Cave, Atlantic Islands Festival, Isle of Luing, Scottish Centre for Geopoetics, July 2009
Fingal's Cave, Mendelssohn on Mull Festival, An Tobar, Tobermory, Isle of Mull, June 2009
Lament, Society of Scottish Artists annual exhibition, Vision Building, Dundee, May/June 2009
Lament, Forest Gallery, Selkirk, April 2009
Lament, Casa Artelor, Timișoara, Romania, March 2009

2008
Fingal's Cave, Foksal Gallery, Warsaw, Poland, June/July 2008

2007
Contact Rushes, Fabrycka Sztuki, Lodz, Poland, December 2007
Contact Rushes, The National Brukenthal Museum, Sibiu, Romania, November 2007
Contact Rushes, Scottish National Portrait Gallery, Edinburgh, August 2007
Evanescence – Ice/Thaw Norway, Demarco European Art Foundation, Edinburgh/Glasgow

2006
A Landscape Symphony in 22 Movements, Ruskin Gallery, Cambridge, October 2006

2005
A Landscape Symphony in 22 Movements, Threshold Artspace, Perth Concert Hall, Perth, October 2005
The Guru, Threshold Artspace, Perth Concert Hall, Perth, October 2005

2003
The Windmills of Innerleithen, Innerliethen, Scottish Borders, June 2003
Reception, Ledingham Chalmers, Edinburgh, January 2003

== Residencies ==
2007
Brantwood, Former home of John Ruskin / Brantwood Trust, Coniston, Lake District, England

2004–2005
Threshold Artspace, Perth Concert Hall, Perth, Lead Artist

== Public collections ==
Threshold Artspace, Perth Concert Hall, Perth
Anglia Ruskin University, Cambridge
Corporate Collections:
Ledingham Chalmers, Edinburgh

== Publications ==
Lament, Nowhere Arts, Artists monograph 2009
Borderline, Timișoara, Romania, Group catalogue/ conference paper 2009 – In Romanian and English
Fingal's Cave / Blue Flora Celtica, Foksal Gallery, Poland, Joint exhibition catalogue 2008
Contact Rushes / Poprzez Portret, Fabryka Sztuki / Narodowe Centrum Kultury, Exhibition catalogue 2007
A Landscape Symphony in 22 Movements, Threshold Artspace, Exhibition catalogue 2005
Threshold, Threshold Artspace, Project catalogue 2005
The Windmills of Innerleithen, Exhibition catalogue 2005
Reception, Ledingham Chalmers, Exhibition catalogue 2003
