= Waliły =

- Village
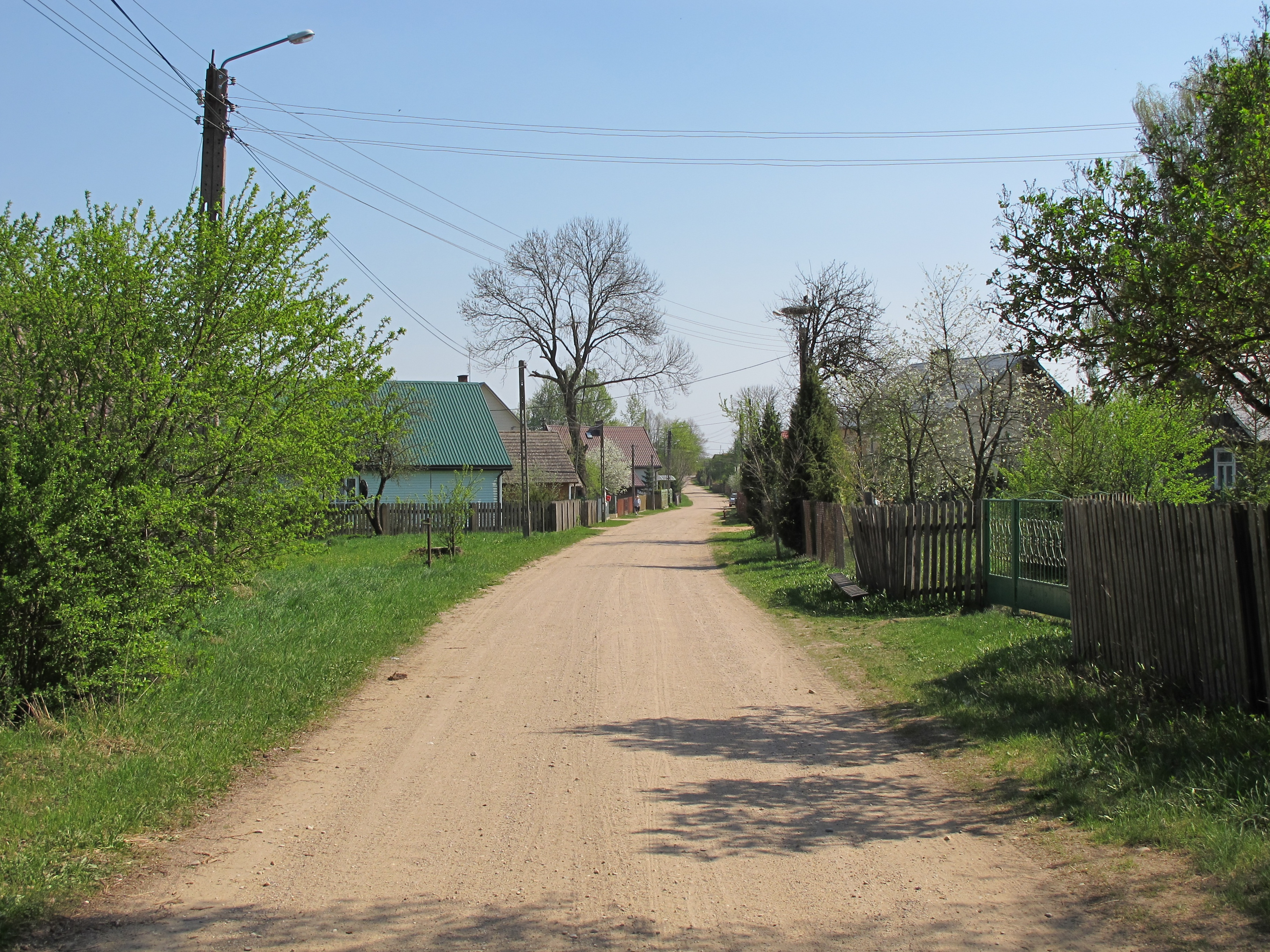

- Location within Poland
- Coordinates: 53°9′N 23°35′E
- Country: Poland
- Voivodeship: Podlaskie
- County: Białystok
- Gmina: Gródek
- Population: 290

Waliły [vaˈliwɨ] is a village in north-eastern Poland, in the administrative district of Gmina Gródek, within Białystok County, Podlaskie Voivodeship, close to the border with Belarus.

== Notable people ==
- Leon Tarasewicz, Polish artist of Belarusian origin.
