= Janusz Bałdyga =

Polish artist

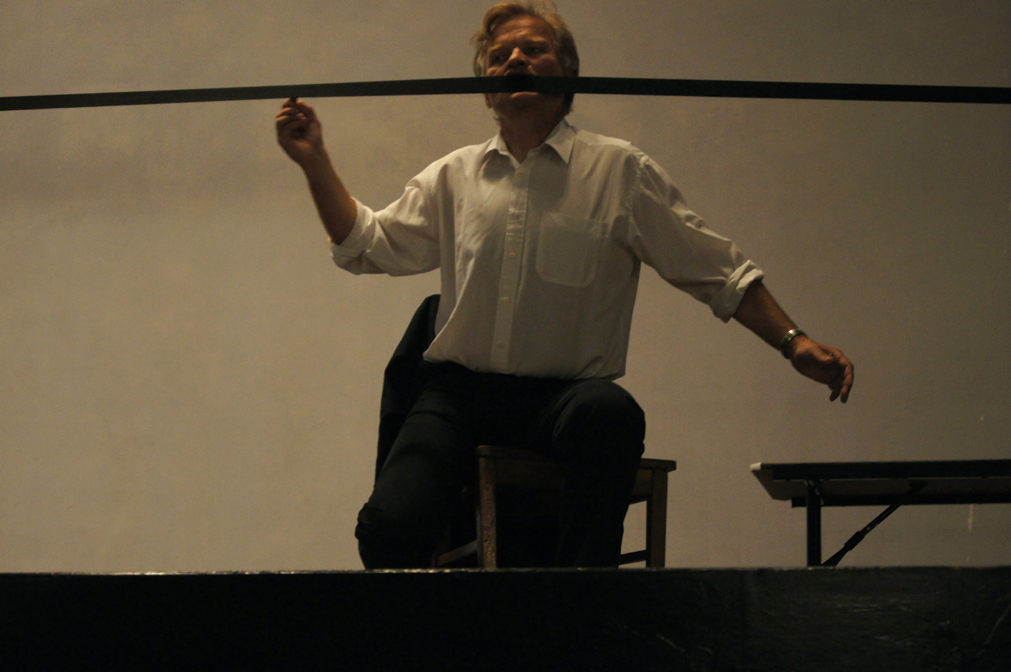
Janusz Bałdyga, Sokołowsko 2012

Janusz Bałdyga was born in 1954 in Lublin, Poland. He works as a performance artist and creates installations. In 1974, he started his studies in painting at the Academy of Fine Arts in Warsaw and graduated in the studio of prof Stefan Gierowski in 1979. Bałdyga has been active in the fields of performance art, installations, objects and drawing since the beginning of his professional journey.

While Bałdyga was still occupied with painting as his medium, an object and actions performed on it became a basic characteristic of Baldyga's artistic language. For example, Some of his paintings like a duplicated map of Poland were to be encountered later in his street performances. Since he joined the Akademia Ruchu theatre in 1979, he constantly has combined visual art and performances. Sometimes you can see his sculptural installations as a scenography of his performances in which you can see the documentation of his earlier action in those objects. He mentioned: “I don’t see any absolute border between performance as a gesture and object of the performance as an effect of the gesture”

In the eighties, he started to employ and relate to some elements of visual information: sings, colors and simple drawings. He referred to the complex network of visual information that was transparent, unified and ideologically controlled.

Later on performance art has become the main focus of Janusz Bałdyga's artistic activity. Over many years of practice, he has developed a unique style, characterized by the downsizing of the language and means of articulation by using simple elements to create elementary structures. He says "Performance art, often combined with object, drawing or elements of installation art, constitutes the core of my artistic practice. Writing about performance art, I highlight its fundamental, yet often ignored, educational aspect. Performance is an open discipline, constantly revealing the process of its own creation, facing artists with strongly articulated self-education tasks."

Bałdyga uses solid materials such as wood or metal for creating his objects. At the same time that his constructions look very light – like they can move any second– they contain a constant tension inside. Sometimes the slight touch can agitate the inner balance and literally destroy the construction. “I think about the mistake as an important factor in creating the event” – Janusz Bałdyga says. Therefore, it can be assumed that the deconstruction which causes a revaluation of the existing state of the incidents is part of the artist's conception. We can summarize that Bałdyga's work is elegant and minimalist. It is being stripped of everything except the necessaries. Although his works reach a high degree of abstraction, yet it remains poignant, political and present. The space and rhythm of Janusz Bałdyga's work lead the audience more aware of the symbolic weight of each gesture.

As the artist says himself, "I am not a commentator but the creator of a particular situation which, being located in a specific space and time, cannot be free from sociopolitical references".

Currently, Janusz Bałdyga is a professor of performance art at the University of Arts in Poznan.
