= Małgorzata Dawidek Gryglicka =

Polish painter (born 1976)

- Born: 1976 (age 49–50); Parczew, Poland
- Occupations: visual artist, writer, art historian

Małgorzata Dawidek Gryglicka (born 1976) is a Polish visual artist, writer and art historian. She lives in the UK. Dawidek came onto the Polish art scene in the early 2000s.

Dawidek combines a wide range of media in her projects – textual objects and installations, painting, animation, photographs, written drawings and hypertexts.

She is a researcher of visual literature and the author of articles, studies and books on visual texts, including A Piece of Poetry and History of the visual text. Poland after 1967, which was awarded the National Centre of Culture in Poland Prize for the best PhD dissertation in the field of culture studies (2010).

== Early life ==
Dawidek was born in 1976 in Poland. She attended the University of Fine Arts in Poznań, and earned a PhD in art history from the Institute of Art History at Adam Mickiewicz University in Poznań.

== Career ==
Dawidek has received multiple grants including the Polish Ministry of Culture and National Heritage in 2002 and 2010, and the Pollock-Krasner Foundation in 2004. In 2014 Dawidek held an Artistic Residency at The Art House, Wakefield, UK

Since 2015, Dawidek has been conducting research at Slade School of Fine Art, University College London.

In 2011 Dawidek exhibited Fold-ups at the Wrocław Contemporary Museum. In 2015 she exhibited her work at the Centrala Space in Birmingham. The show was called Conversio, and focused on the migrant community.

== Books ==
- Historia tekstu wizualnego. Polska po 1967 roku/History of Visual Text. Poland after 1967, Ha!art, CMW, Kraków-Wrocław 2012. ISBN 978-83-62574-37-7 / 978-83-63350-04-8
- Odprysk poezji. Stanisław Dróżdż mówi/A Piece of Poetry. Conversations with Stanisław Dróżdż, Korporacja Ha!art, Kraków 2012. ISBN 978-83-61407-14-0
- TEKST-TURA. Wokół nowych form tekstu wizualnego i tekstu jako dzieła sztuki, ed. Małgorzata Dawidek Gryglicka Korporacja Ha!art, Kraków 2005. ISBN 83-89911-32-9
