= Koji Kamoji =

Japanese/Polish contemporary artist (born 1935)

Koji Kamoji (born 1935 in Tokyo) is a Japanese/Polish contemporary artist, who lives and works in Warsaw, Poland.

== Life and works ==
Koji Kamoji is a painter and creator installations and objects.

Between 1953 and 1958 he studied at the Musashino Art University (diploma in 1958). In 1959, he moved to Poland to study at the Warsaw Academy of Fine Arts (diploma in 1966).

From 1967 he has been represented by Foksal Gallery in Warsaw.

Works of Koji Kamoji has been exhibited at Starmach Gallery, Zachęta National Gallery of Art in Warsaw, Foksal Gallery, Centre for Contemporary Art at Ujazdowski Castle and Museum of Art in Łódź among others.
