= Leon Tarasewicz =

Polish painter and academic

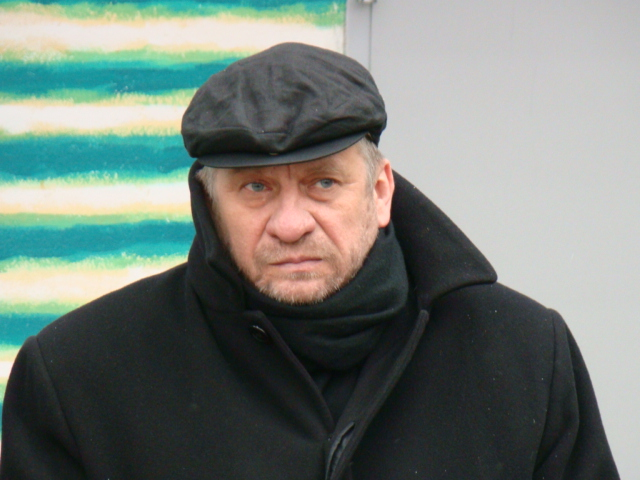
- Born: 14 March 1957 (age 69); Waliły, Polish People's Republic
- Education: Academy of Fine Arts in Warsaw
- Known for: Painting, graphic design
- Notable work: Logo of Podlaskie Voivodeship
- Movement: Contemporary art
- Awards: Order of Polonia Restituta

Leon Tarasewicz (born 14 March 1957 in Waliły) is a Polish painter of Belarusian origin, professor of fine arts, academic teacher at the Academy of Fine Arts in Warsaw.

== Biography ==
Tarasewicz was born into a working-class family. A graduate of the Art High School in Supraśl, and then the Faculty of Painting of the Academy of Fine Arts in Warsaw in the studio of Tadeusz Dominik (he received his diploma in 1984). From 1996, he ran a guest painting studio at the same university. He became a lecturer in painting space at the Faculty of Media Art and Scenography of the Academy of Fine Arts in Warsaw. In 2011, the President of Poland, Bronisław Komorowski, awarded him the title of professor of fine arts.

He cooperates with Foksal Gallery in Warsaw, Galeria Monopol, Galeria Arsenal in Białystok, Galeria Krynki in Krynki, Galeria Ego in Poznań, and Galeria Biała in Lublin[6]. In 2008, he became the ambassador of the European Year of Intercultural Dialogue.

He emphasizes his Belarusian roots and promotes the culture of this minority in Poland.

Leon Tarasewicz's painting reflects the beauty and colors of nature in a unique way and refers to the complex history of the Polish borderland.

The most extensive bibliography of publications devoted to him (and filmography) is contained in the catalog of the exhibition at Ujazdowski Castle in 2003.

In 2005, at the ceremony during the season-opening concert in the building of the Podlaska Opera and Orchestra in Białystok, he was awarded the Gloria Artis Medal for Merit to Culture by the Minister of Culture, Waldemar Dąbrowski. In 2011, he was awarded the Knight's Cross of the Order of Polonia Restituta. He also received the Paszport Polityki award (2000), the Award of Jan Cybis (1998) and the Zofia and Jerzy Nowosielski Foundation Award. In 2007, Tarasewicz received the Grand Prize of the Cultural Foundation for 2006 for consistently challenging both the traditional understanding of painting and all conventions of understanding art. In 2014, he received the Honorary Pearl of the Polish Economy (in the culture category), awarded by the editorial office of Polish Market. In 2022, he was awarded an honorary doctorate from the University of Białystok.
