= Marymont metro station =

Warsaw metro station

Marymont
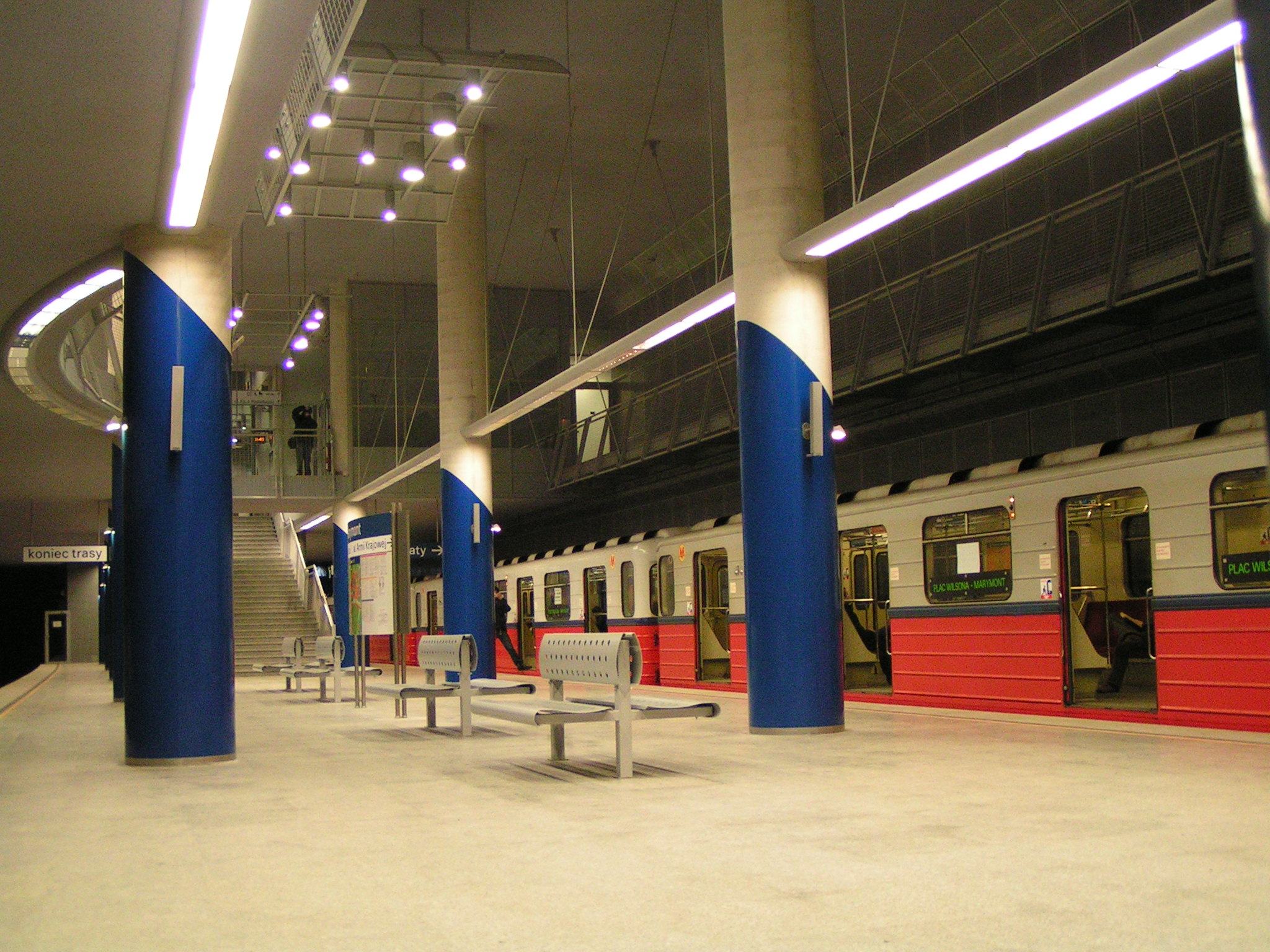

General information
- Coordinates: 52°16′18″N 20°58′18″E
- Owner: Public Transport Authority
- Platforms: 1 island platform
- Tracks: 2
- Connections: 110, 121, 116, 132, 134, 326, 518, 705, 735; N13, N44, N63; 6, 15, 17, 27, 36

Construction
- Structure type: Underground
- Platform levels: 1
- Accessible: Yes

Other information
- Station code: A-19
- Fare zone: 1

History
- Opened: 29 December 2006; 19 years ago

Services
Preceding station	Warsaw Metro	Following station
Słodowiec towards Młociny	M1 line	Plac Wilsona towards Kabaty
Location
- Location within Warsaw

Metro Marymont is the 17th working station on Line M1 of the Warsaw Metro, opened on 29 December 2006 as the northern terminus of an extension from Plac Wilsona. It is located in the Marymont neighbourhood of Warsaw. Since the station has no reversing facility of its own, from its opening until 20 March 2008 it was connected to the rest of the network by a single train providing shuttle service to the nearest station at Plac Wilsona. With the completion of the next station on the line, Słodowiec, equipped with a reversing facility, on 23 April 2008, this was no longer necessary, and Marymont station is now serviced by all metro trains running on the line.
