= Alexander Hahn (artist) =

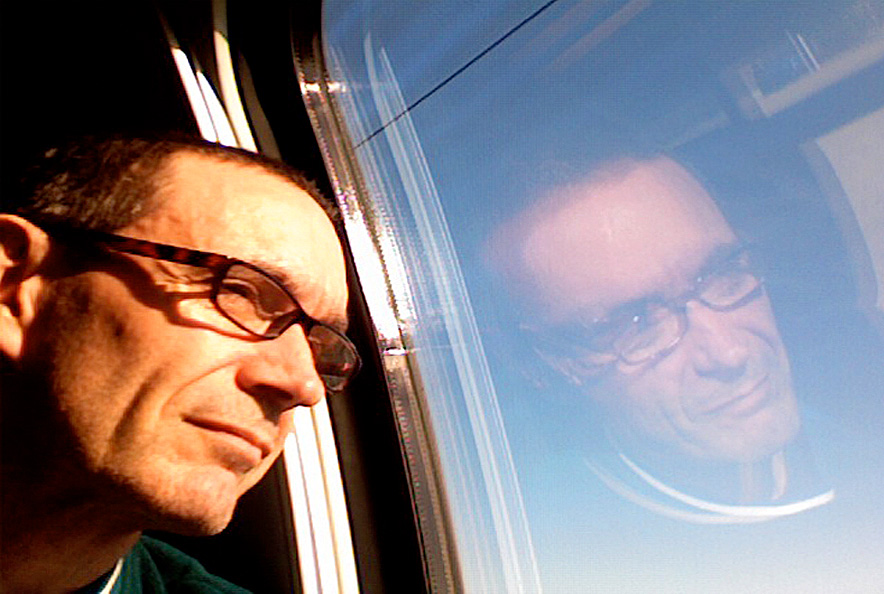
Alexander Hahn

Alexander Hahn (born 9 June 1954 in Rapperswil, Switzerland) is a Swiss-American artist working with electronic and digital media, widely regarded as a pioneer of new media. Since the late 1970s, his work has combined video, computer-generated imagery, installation, virtual reality and other digital formats, drawing on everyday observation and personal experience as well as history and science. Recurring concerns include perception, memory, dream and the relationship between recorded and imagined reality.

Hahn's work was the subject of a retrospective at the Kunstmuseum Solothurn and the Museum der Moderne Salzburg in 2007, and of the survey exhibition Memory of Light – Light of Memory at the Kunstmuseum St. Gallen in 2022–23.

== Life ==
Hahn grew up in Rapperswil, Switzerland. He studied art education at the Kunstgewerbeschule Zürich (now the Zurich University of the Arts), completing his degree in 1979. During his studies he began working with video and Super 8 film, including Flight and Glass (1976) and the mockumentary Demis (1977). In 1981, he moved to New York and participated in the Whitney Museum of American Art Independent Study Program.

In 1990, Hahn spent nine months in Rome as a fellow of the Istituto Svizzero. Between 1991 and 1994, he lived in Berlin, first as a fellow of the DAAD Artists-in-Berlin Program and then as an artist-in-residence at ART+COM. From 1995 to 1997, he lived in Warsaw.

== Work ==
Hahn developed his practice in the 1970s during the formative period of video and new-media art, moving early between analogue video and computer-based image making. Since the late 1970s, he has drawn on personal experience and everyday observation as well as history and science, transforming these sources through electronic and digital media. Recurring concerns include perception, memory, dream, and the shifting boundary between recorded and imagined reality. In Miniature and Series: The Re-invention of the Epistolary Form in the Work of Alexander Hahn, Cathie Payne discusses Hahn's use of short, episodic video forms as a strategy for recording transient and ephemeral encounters and relates them to an intimate and reflexive practice of observing and mapping the contemporary world.

Among Hahn's early works was the performance and installation Wege – Ways, first presented at Galerie Apropos in Lucerne in 1978 and subsequently in Bern and New York. Reviewing the 1980 Bern presentation, Res Ingold described an environment with a salt-covered floor, a wire network suspended beneath the ceiling, and hanging threads that Hahn ignited one after another, producing changing paths of small flames through the room.

During the 1980s and 1990s, Hahn increasingly combined recorded video with computer-generated imagery, animation and spatial installation. Works such as Urban Memories (1986), The Bernoulli Itinerary (1989) and Fundamentals of Legerdemain (1992) explored the relationship between electronic images, physical display structures and simulated space. In 1996 he began the ongoing series The Artist's Studio as Encryption Lab, using computer-generated images to reconfigure the artist's studio as an imagined and encoded space.

A central later work is Luminous Point (2005), an interactive video projection presented by the San Francisco Museum of Modern Art in the 2008 exhibition Room for Thought: Alexander Hahn and Yves Netzhammer. Beginning with a computer simulation of Hahn's Manhattan apartment, the work turns domestic architecture into what SFMOMA described as a metaphor for the artist's "mental landscape". Using a handheld controller, viewers navigate through a labyrinth of rooms, objects and transitional image sequences in which photographic records, invented environments, memory and imagination overlap. The work has also been described as an interactive "memory palace", linking its spatial structure to the mnemonic tradition of the method of loci.

In 2007, Kunstmuseum Solothurn and the Museum der Moderne Salzburg presented a retrospective of Hahn's work; the accompanying bilingual catalogue Alexander Hahn: Werke/Works 1976–2006, edited by Christoph Vögele, was published by Kehrer Verlag. In 2022–23, Kunstmuseum St. Gallen presented the survey exhibition Memory of Light – Light of Memory, comprising 23 works and groups of works from 1996 to 2022 and placing particular emphasis on Hahn's Indian Cycle. The museum subsequently acquired the large-scale LED work Transit of Earth (2022) as well as works from The Artist's Studio as Encryption Lab.

Hahn's more recent work extends these earlier interests in computation, language and image construction into artificial intelligence. In 2025, Museum Jorn presented Getting Nowhere, based on a 1981 dialogue between Hahn and the early chatbot ELIZA. His series Stable Diffusion – Medusa Rising I–VIII (2023–24) uses generative AI, while CFL – Coded Fluorescent Light II – A Video Rebus (2025) translates verses from the Rigveda into a visual system of letters, images and Morse-like signals.

== Selected works ==
- 2026: How Not to Drown, 4K experimental video combining archival material, computer animation and AI-assisted image reconstruction.
- 2025: CFL – Coded Fluorescent Light II – A Video Rebus, site-specific video projection using visual and Morse-like codes to spell verses from the Rigveda.
- 2023–24: Stable Diffusion – Medusa Rising I–VIII, series of AI-generated images.
- 2022: Transit of Earth, video and 3D animation for a large-scale LED mosaic; collection Kunstmuseum St. Gallen.
- 2022: (Thomas Daniell and) The Ruins of Naurattan, kinetic video installation combining a moving rear-view mirror with an LCD monitor and video projection.
- 2022: INDOCAM, experimental feature-length video; world premiere at the 57th Solothurn Film Festival.
- 2019: Albedo 0.30, 24-hour video loop for a large-scale LED mosaic, permanently installed at F. Hoffmann-La Roche in Kaiseraugst, Switzerland.
- 2016: CFL – Coded Fluorescent Light, three-channel video installation.
- 2008–present: Video Vignettes, ongoing series of short, epistolary videos based on everyday observations.
- 2005: Luminous Point, interactive video projection in which a computer simulation of Hahn's Manhattan apartment becomes a navigable mental landscape and memory palace.
- 2002–present: The Dead, ongoing series of cylindrical-anamorphic video reliquaries; the first group, 5 Anamorphoses, was presented at the Musée Jenisch, Vevey, in 2002.
- 1999: My Own Private Universe, three computer animations for rear projection, commissioned for Swisscom in Worblaufen.
- 1996–present: The Artist's Studio as Encryption Lab, ongoing series of 3D computer-generated images and prints.
- 1992: Fundamentals of Legerdemain, computer-animation installation.
- 1990: Dirt Site, single-channel video.
- 1989: The Bernoulli Itinerary, video installation combining projection and stripped television monitors.
- 1988: Arthur, five-channel video installation with eight monitors and multichannel sound.
- 1987: Viewers of Optics, single-channel video.
- 1986: Urban Memories, three-channel computer animation and video installation.
- 1983: A Young Person's Guide to Walking Outside the City, computer animation programmed in Texas Instruments Extended BASIC on a TI-99/4A home computer, 2 min 25 sec.
- 1982: The Outer Plant – Die Aussenstation, science-fiction video, 25 min 16 sec.
- 1981: Getting Nowhere, video based on Hahn's 1981 dialogue with the early chatbot ELIZA.
- 1977: Demis, Super 8 mockumentary.

== Selected exhibitions ==
=== Solo exhibitions / project presentations (selected) ===
- 2026: Alexander Hahn – Selected Video Works and an Interview with the Artist, KINOMUZEUM, Muzeum Sztuki Nowoczesnej w Warszawie (Museum of Modern Art in Warsaw), Warsaw (Poland).
- 2025–26: ON AIR :: CFL – Coded Fluorescent Light II – A Video Rebus (site-specific projection), Kunsthaus Grenchen (Switzerland).
- 2025: Getting Nowhere, Museum Jorn, Silkeborg (Denmark).
- 2022–23: Memory of Light – Light of Memory, Kunstmuseum St. Gallen (Switzerland).
- 2022: INDOCAM (world premiere), 57th Solothurn Film Festival (Switzerland).
- 2018: India Material, The Shed Space, Brooklyn, New York (United States).
- 2017: Moonlighting: Dance by Lunar Polarity, Schlesinger Stiftung, Wald, Appenzell Ausserrhoden (Switzerland).
- 2015: All the World is a Stage, Kunstraum Oktogon, Bern (Switzerland).
- 2013: Indian Records (NY Electronic Arts Festival), Harvestworks, New York (United States).
- 2012: Cao Chang Di Road on November 24 2009 I Stood There Waiting, Harvestworks, New York (United States).
- 2010: Bringing Things to a Standstill, Kunstraum Oktogon, Bern (Switzerland).
- 2010: Luminous Point, Le Petit Versailles, New York (United States).
- 2008: Room for Thought: Alexander Hahn and Yves Netzhammer, San Francisco Museum of Modern Art, San Francisco (United States).
- 2008: Alexander Hahn – Luminous Point, Museo d'Arte Contemporanea di Villa Croce, Genoa (Italy), as part of Festival della Scienza.
- 2007: Works 1976–2006 (retrospective), Kunstmuseum Solothurn (Switzerland) and Museum der Moderne Salzburg (Austria).
- 2007: La Signoria degli Astri, Padiglione d'Arte Contemporanea, Ferrara (Italy).
- 2002: Mémoires Astrales d'un Homme Volant, Musée Jenisch, Vevey (Switzerland).
- 2000: Memory of Presence, Netmage / LINK, Bologna (Italy).
- 1999: I Came Here to Sleep, Neuer Berliner Kunstverein, Berlin (Germany).
- 1995: Personal Records, Kunsthaus Zürich (Switzerland).
- 1994: Rats (Ratten), DAAD Galerie, Berlin (Germany).
- 1993: Of Shadow & Light, World Wide Video Centre, The Hague (Netherlands).
- 1984: Cyborgs and Other New Machines, White Columns, New York (United States).
- 1982: Plant #50-316, Franklin Furnace, New York (United States).
- 1980: Wege – Ways, Galerie Toni Gerber, Bern (Switzerland).
- 1978: Wege – Ways, Galerie Apropos, Lucerne (Switzerland).

=== Group exhibitions and screenings (selected) ===
- 2026–27: For One Solid Time, WET: The Swimming Pool in the Imagination, Musée des Beaux-Arts Le Locle (Switzerland), with Sleep – A Second's Glance; scheduled for 3 October 2026–21 February 2027.
- 2026: Reckless Abandon, New Media Artspace, Baruch College, City University of New York (online), with How Not to Drown.
- 2026: Mehr Licht. Video in der Kunst, Kunstmuseum Solothurn and Aargauer Kunsthaus (Switzerland).
- 2025: Prints, Pixels & Patina – vom (digitalen) Abdruck, Kunsthaus Grenchen (Switzerland).
- 2025: Disruptions: Early Video Art in Europe, Fonds municipal d'art contemporain, Geneva (Switzerland), with Jona (1976).
- 2024–25: IMPRESSION 2024/2025, Kunsthaus Grenchen (Switzerland).
- 2023–24: Expanding Horizons – Videos from the Collection and Beyond, Kunstmuseum St. Gallen (Switzerland).
- 2020–21: Welt am Draht – World on the Wire, Kunstmuseum St. Gallen (Switzerland).
- 2020: #ICPConcerned: Global Images for Global Crisis, International Center of Photography, New York (United States).
- 2019: Physical and Digital: Multifaceted Visions in Electronic Art, New York Electronic Art Festival, Governors Island, New York (United States).
- 2017: Rebel Video: The Video Movement of the 1970s and 1980s, Swiss National Museum, Zurich (Switzerland).
- 2016: Zeit verstreichen. Moment und Dauer in der Gegenwartskunst, Kunstmuseum Solothurn (Switzerland).
- 2015–16: Heimspiel 2015, Kunstmuseum St. Gallen, Kunst Halle Sankt Gallen and venues in Vaduz (Switzerland/Liechtenstein).
- 2014: Hyper-Seeing, CAFA Art Museum, Beijing (China).
- 2013: Difference Screen, Artisterium, Tbilisi (Georgia), Mongolian National Modern Art Gallery, Ulaanbaatar (Mongolia), and other venues.
- 2010: Die Entdeckung der Langsamkeit, Kunstmuseum Solothurn (Switzerland).
- 2009: Media Art China – Timelapse, National Art Museum of China, Beijing (China).
- 2008: Reconstructing Swiss Video Art from the 1970s and 1980s, Kunstmuseum Luzern (Switzerland).
- 2005: Me Myself I: Konstruktion von Raum und Identität in der Kunst der Gegenwart, Kunstmuseum St. Gallen (Switzerland).
- 2002–03: bilder*codes# 1992–2002, ZKM, Karlsruhe (Germany).
- 1999: MediaSkulptur '99 – Video-Kunst-Szene-Schweiz, Kunsthaus Langenthal (Switzerland).
- 1995: Video / I See, Swiss Institute, New York (United States), curated by Esther M. Jungo and Maria Smolenicka.
- 1995: Vagamundo: Reflexiones sobre el exilio, Museo Nacional Centro de Arte Reina Sofía, Madrid (Spain).
- 1993: The Final Frontier, New Museum, New York (United States).
- 1992: Committed Visions, Museum of Modern Art, New York (United States), with Dirt Site (1990).
- 1989: Video-Skulptur retrospektiv und aktuell, Kölnischer Kunstverein, Cologne (West Germany), and Kunsthaus Zürich (Switzerland).
- 1988: SIGGRAPH, Atlanta (United States), and 7th World Wide Video Festival, The Hague (Netherlands).
- 1987: Ars Electronica, Linz (Austria), and World Wide Video Festival, The Hague (Netherlands).
- 1987: Stiller Nachmittag: Aspekte junger Schweizer Kunst, Kunsthaus Zürich (Switzerland).
- 1985: Alles und noch viel mehr, Kunstmuseum Bern and Kunsthalle Bern (Switzerland).
- 1983: Szene Schweiz, Kölnischer Kunstverein, Cologne (West Germany).
- 1982: Pastiche, Grommet Gallery, New York (United States), curated by Jean Dupuy.

== Selected public collections and archives ==
- Centre Pompidou, Paris – Viewers of Optics (1987), acquired in 1988.
- Fonds municipal d'art contemporain de la Ville de Genève (FMAC), Geneva – works in the institution's video collection.
- GBH Media Library and Archives, Boston – Aviation Memories (1986), preserved in the New Television Workshop archive.
- Kunsthaus Zürich, Zurich – works in the museum's collection.
- Kunstmuseum Bern, Bern – Viewers of Optics (1987).
- Kunstmuseum Solothurn, Solothurn – works in the museum's media-art collection, including Urbs Turrita – City of Towers (1992), Of Shadow & Light – Riddle of Images (1993), Cao Chang Di Road on November 24 2009 I Stood There Waiting (2012), and The Dead. Taylor Mead (2013).
- Kunstmuseum St. Gallen, St. Gallen – Transit of Earth (2022) and works from The Artist's Studio as Encryption Lab.
- Kunstmuseum Winterthur, Winterthur – works in the museum's new-media collection.
- Kunst(Zeug)Haus, Rapperswil-Jona – works in the Sammlung Bosshard.
- Musée Jenisch, Vevey – 5 Anamorphoses :: The Dead (2002), five-channel cylindrical-anamorphic video installation.
- n.b.k. Video-Forum, Berlin – works in the Video-Forum collection.
- ZKM Center for Art and Media Karlsruhe, Karlsruhe – works including Aerial Stills (1988) and The Bernoulli Itinerary.

== Awards and grants (selected) ==
- 2025: Winning project, international ON AIR open call, Kunsthaus Grenchen, for CFL – Coded Fluorescent Light II – A Video Rebus.
- 2023: Best Video, Video Art category, ON ART – Poland Film Festival, for INDOCAM.
- 2015: Lotteriefonds of the Canton of St. Gallen, project grant for Indian Cycle.
- 2011: Cultural Prize of the City of Rapperswil-Jona.
- 2009: Cultural Award, St. Gallische Kulturstiftung.
- 2008: Media Production Grant, New York State Council on the Arts.
- 2007: Work Grant, City of Zurich.
- 2005: Finishing Funds, Experimental Television Center, Owego, New York.
- 2004: sitemapping.ch, Swiss Federal Office of Culture.
- 2000: Namics Art Prize for New Media.
- 1998: Laser d'Oro, VideoArt Festival, Locarno.
- 1995: Prize for Young Swiss Art (Kunstpreis der Zürcher Kunstgesellschaft), Kunsthaus Zürich.
- 1995: Media Production Grant, New York State Council on the Arts.
- 1993: Swiss Federal Art Grant.
- 1992: Installation Award, World Wide Video Festival, The Hague, for The Bernoulli Itinerary.
- 1992: Grand Prix, Festival International du Jeune Vidéo, Montreal, for Dirt Site.
- 1992: Special Mention, 6ème MIV & TV Festival, Montbéliard, for Dirt Site.
- 1990: Work of Excellence, Tokyo Video Festival, for Dirt Site.
- 1990: Honorable Mention, Australian Video Festival, for Dirt Site.
- 1990: Media Production Grant, New York State Council on the Arts.
- 1989: Media Production Grant, New York State Council on the Arts; funding supported the production of Dirt Site.
- 1989: Kenneth Patchen Award, San Francisco Poetry Film Festival, for Arthur.
- 1989: Art Matters grant, New York.
- 1988: Swiss Federal Art Grant.
- 1988: Installation Award, World Wide Video Festival, The Hague, for Arthur.
- 1988: Media Production Grant, New York State Council on the Arts.
- 1987: Fellowship in Video, New York Foundation for the Arts.
- 1987: Swiss Federal Art Grant.
- 1987: Grand Prix de la Ville de Genève, 2e Semaine Internationale de Vidéo, for Viewers of Optics.
- 1987: Best of Festival, North Florida Video Festival, for Viewers of Optics.
- 1987: First Prize in Computer Graphics, Video Culture International, Don Mills, Canada, for Urban Memories.
- 1985: Recognition Award, Swiss Bank Corporation (Schweizerische Bankgesellschaft).
- 1984: Committee for the Visual Arts Grant, New York, and Fondation de la Vocation, Geneva.
