= National Museum in Warsaw =

National museum in Warsaw, Poland

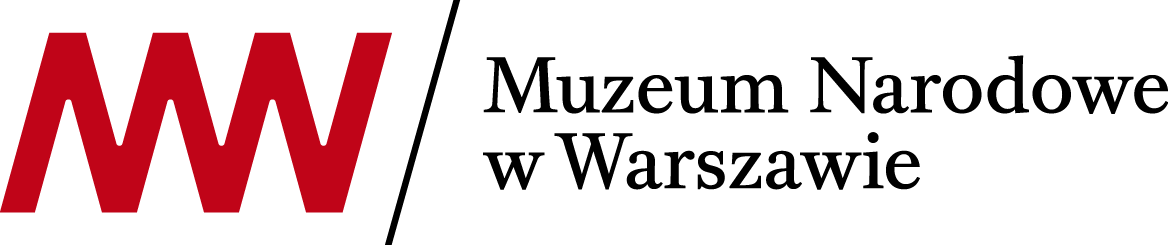

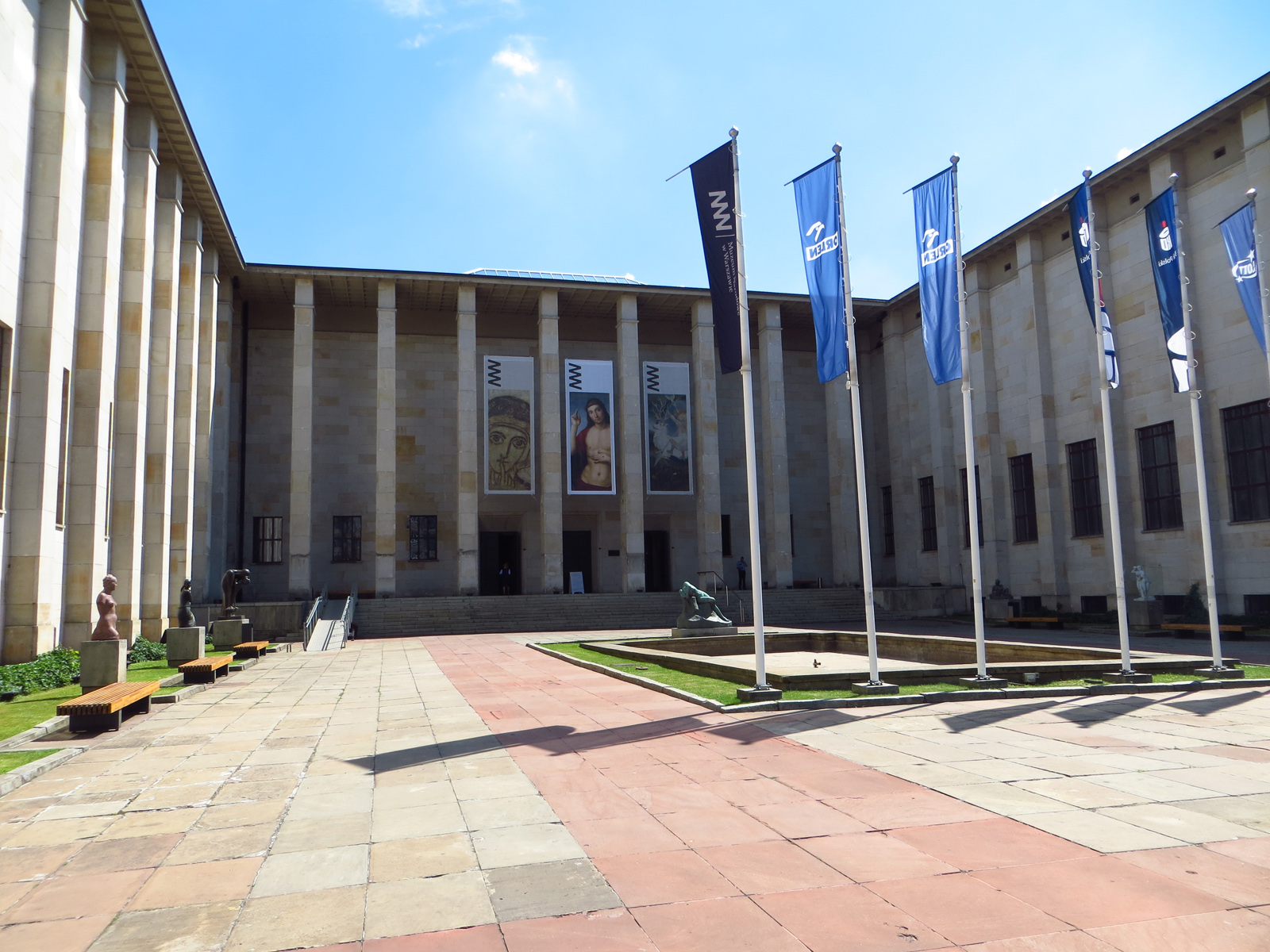
- Main entrance to the National Museum

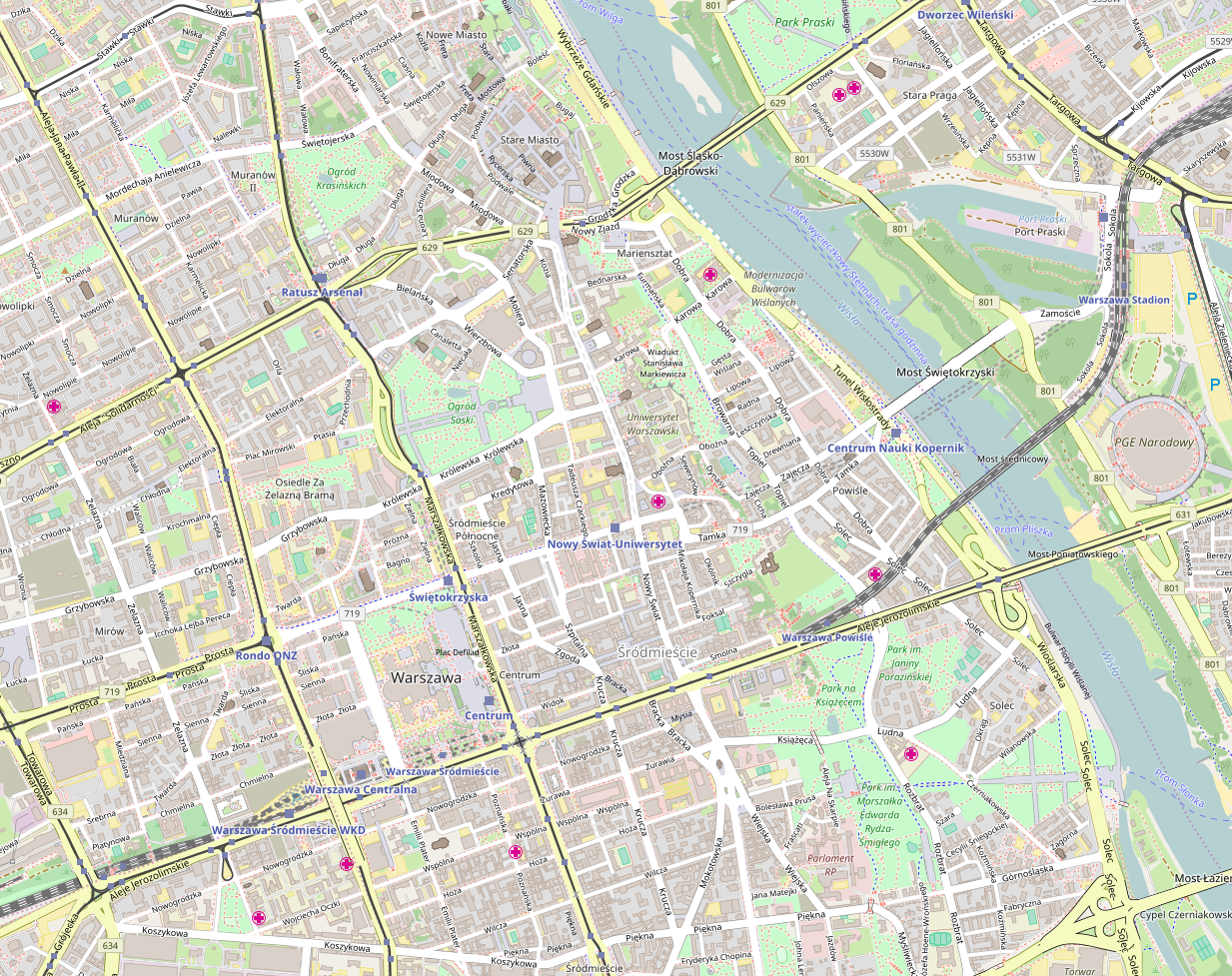
- Location within the city of Warsaw
- Interactive fullscreen map
- Established: 20 May 1862; 164 years ago
- Location: Aleje Jerozolimskie 3, Warsaw, Poland
- Coordinates: 52°13′54″N 21°01′29″E
- Type: National museum
- Collections: Painting, Sculpture, Decorative arts
- Visitors: 540,138 (2015)
- Director: Agnieszka Lajus
- Public transit access: Tram: 7, 8, 9,22, 24, 25; Bus: 111, 117,158, 507, 517, 521 (Muzeum Narodowe); 116, 128, 195, 180, 222, 503 (Foksal)
- Website: mnw.art.pl/en

The National Museum in Warsaw (Polish: Muzeum Narodowe w Warszawie, MNW) is a national art museum located in Warsaw and one of the largest museums in Poland. It comprises a collection of ancient art (Egyptian, Greek, Roman), counting about 11,000 objects, an extensive gallery of Polish painting since the 16th century and a collection of foreign painting including Italian, French, Flemish, Dutch, German and Russian works. The museum also houses numismatic collections, a gallery of applied arts and a department of oriental art, with the largest collection of Chinese art in Poland, comprising some 5,000 objects. With over 1.5 million visitors in 2025, it is the 49th most-visited art museum in the world.

The museum was established on 20 May 1862 as the Museum of Fine Arts, Warsaw, and renamed the National Museum in 1916. Its current building on Jerusalem Avenue, designed by Tadeusz Tolwiński in a modernist style, was inaugurated on 18 June 1938. After Nazi Germany invaded Poland in September 1939, the collection was looted by the Gestapo. Many works were recovered from Germany after the end of World War II under the supervision of longtime director Stanisław Lorentz, though more than 5,000 artefacts remain missing. The collection now comprises over 830,000 items.

The museum is known for the Faras Gallery, housing Europe's largest collection of Nubian Christian art recovered by Polish archaeologists from the Christian cathedral at Faras in Sudan. Other major holdings include the Gallery of Medieval Art, with artifacts from Silesia, Lesser Poland, Greater Poland, and the Hanseatic region, and the Gallery of 19th-century Art, which displays Jan Matejko's monumental oil painting Battle of Grunwald completed in 1878. The National Museum in Warsaw also operates the Nieborów Palace as a subsidiary since 1945, the Poster Museum in Wilanów, and the Xawery Dunikowski Sculpture Museum in Królikarnia.

== History ==
The National Museum in Warsaw was established on 20 May 1862, as the "Museum of Fine Arts, Warsaw", and in 1916 renamed "National Museum, Warsaw" (with the inclusion of collections from museums and cultural institutions such as the Society of Care for Relics of the Past, the Museum of Antiquity at Warsaw University, the Museum of the Society for Encouragement of the Fine Arts, and the Museum of Industry and Agriculture).

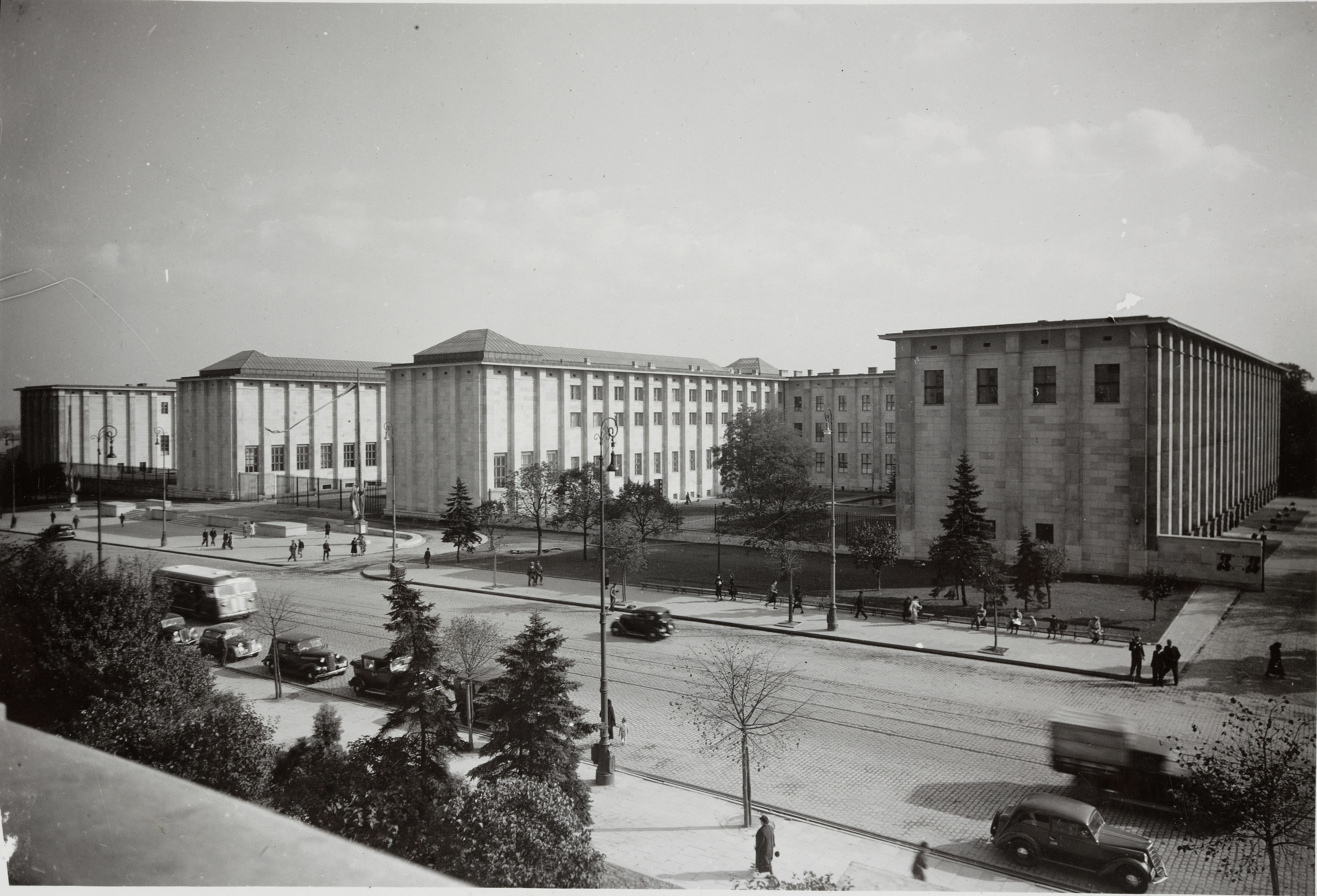
Main facade of the National Museum, 1938

The collection, on Jerusalem Avenue, is housed in a building designed by Tadeusz Tolwiński, developed between 1927 and 1938 (earlier the museum had been located at ulica Podwale 15). In 1932 an exhibition of decorative art opened in the two earlier erected wings of the building. The new building was inaugurated on 18 June 1938. The purpose-built modernistic edifice, was situated on the edge of Na Książęcem Park established between 1776–79 for Prince Kazimierz Poniatowski. From 1935 the museum director was Stanisław Lorentz, who directed an effort to save the most valuable works of art during World War II.

During the invasion of Poland the building was damaged and after the Siege of Warsaw the collection was looted by the Gestapo led by Nazi historian Dagobert Frey, who had already prepared a meticulous list of the most valuable artwork on official visits from Germany in 1937. The Gestapo headquarters presented Rembrandt's portrait of Maerten Soolmans as a gift to Hans Frank in occupied Kraków and packed everything else to be shipped to Berlin. After the war the Polish Government, under the supervision of Professor Lorentz, retrieved many of the works seized by the Germans. More than 5,000 artefacts are still missing.

Many works of art of, at that time unknown or of uncertain provenance (e.g. originating from Nazi German art repositories in Polish Recovered Territories in Kamenz, Karthaus, Liebenthal and Rohnstock among others) were nationalised by the communist authorities using subsequent decrees and acts from 1945, 1946 and 1958 and were included in the museum collection as so-called abandoned property. In 1947, the National Museum launched the country's first postwar touring exhibitions programme, through which works from the museum's collection by artists such as Jan Matejko were shown outside of Poland's major urban centres.

In 2008-2013 the "Polish Archaeological Mission "Tyritake" of National Museum in Warsaw" conducted works at Tyritake, Crimea. In 2016 the "Polish Archaeological Mission "Olbia" commenced works at Olbia (archaeological site), Ukraine. Both are headed by Alfred Twardecki curator of the Ancient Art Gallery. In 2010 the National Museum, as one of the first state institutions in the world, held an exhibition entirely dedicated to homoerotic art - Ars Homo Erotica. Since the 2011–12 renovation, the museum is also considered one of the most modern in Europe with a computer-led LED lighting allowing to enhance unique qualities of every painting and exhibit. At present, the collection of the National Museum in Warsaw includes over 780,000 items displayed in many permanent galleries, including the Professor Kazimierz Michałowski Faras Gallery and galleries given over to ancient art, medieval art, painting, goldsmithing, decorative art, and oriental art, as well as many temporary exhibitions.

In 1945 the National Museum took over the historic Nieborów Palace in the village of the same name and made them its subsidiaries. In the early period, the deputy curator there was the writer Mieczysław Smolarski.

== Permanent galleries ==
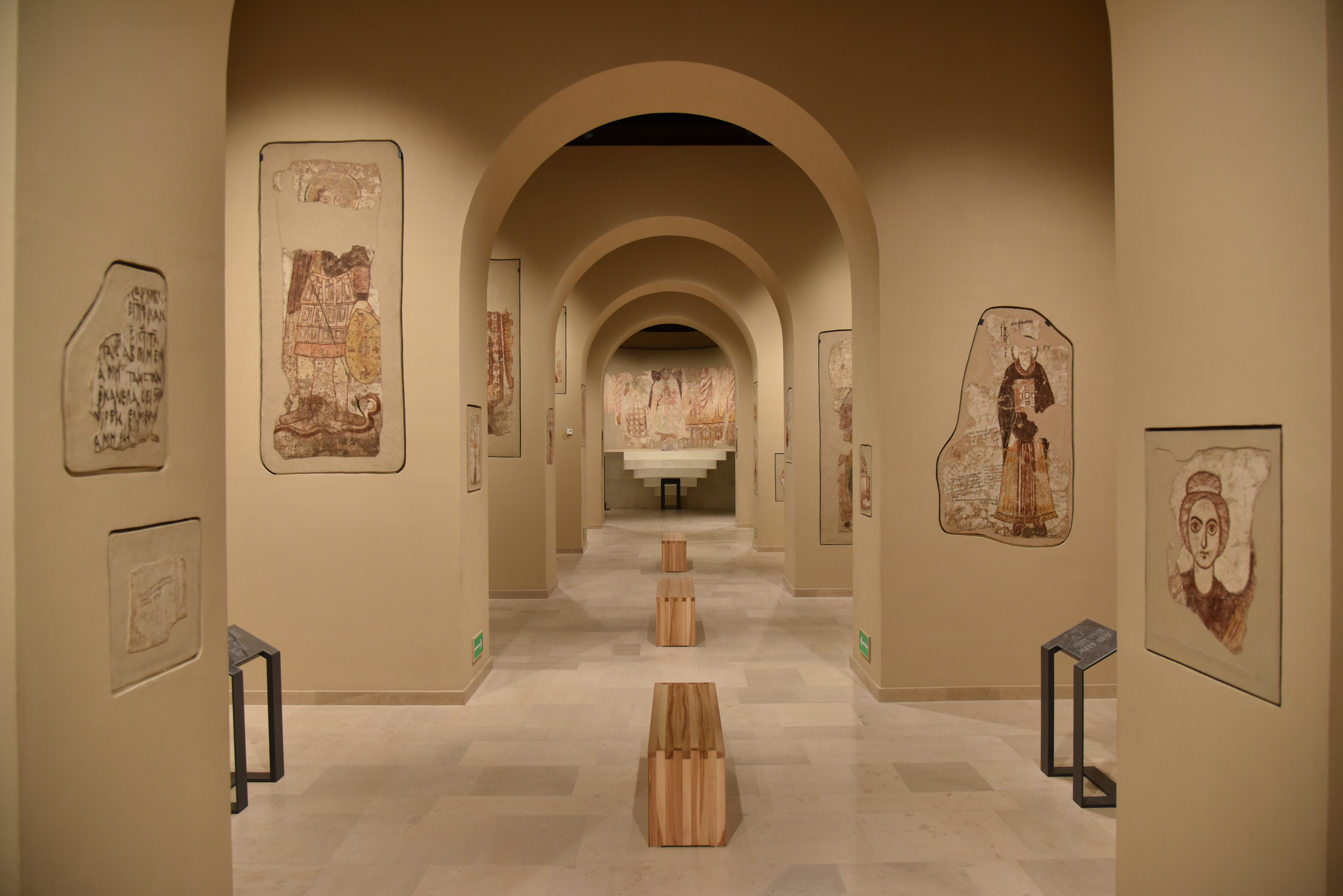
Faras Gallery

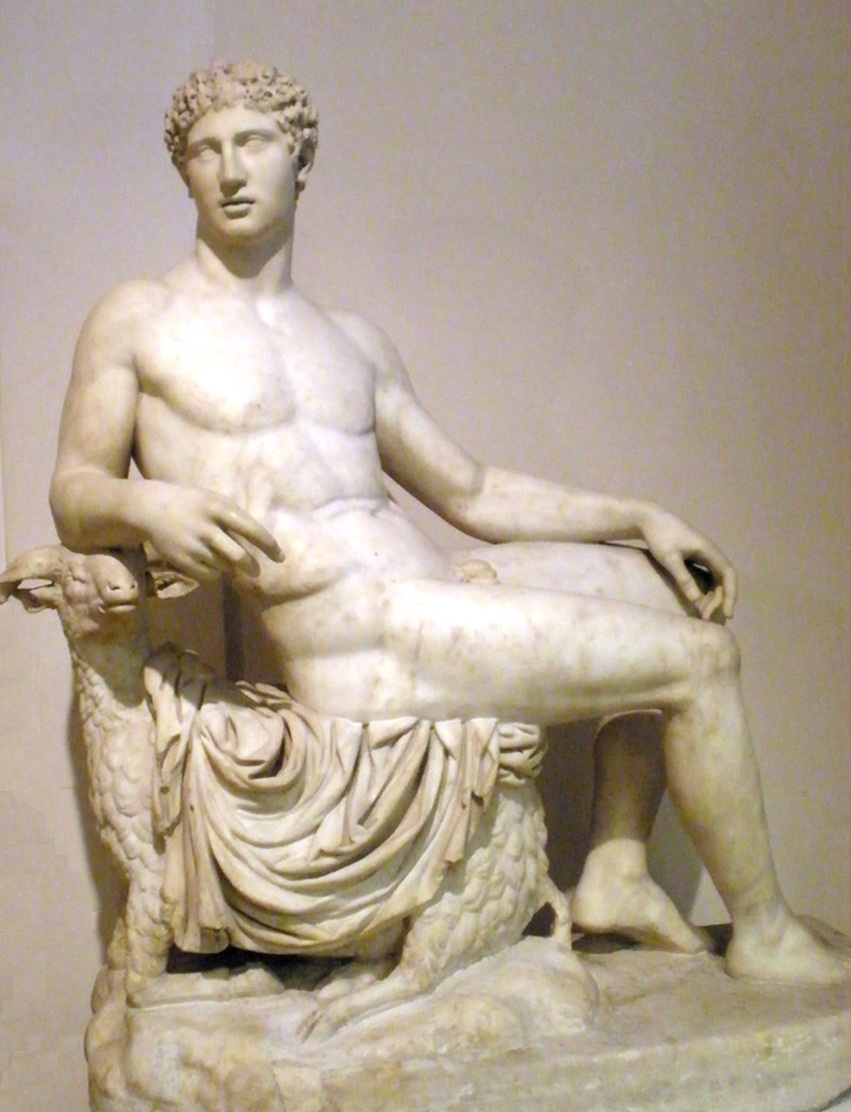
Hermes Sitting on a Ram, 2nd century BC

In 2012 the permanent galleries underwent revolutionary changes. The curators of the museum re-arranged it and supplemented it with new works from the museum's warehouses. Paintings were not hung chronologically, but thematically: genre painting, still lifes, landscapes, cityscapes, biblical, mythological, nudes. Works by Italian, Flemish, Dutch, German and Polish artists were hung together, making it easy to observe and compare similarities and differences. The Gallery of Ancient Art, Faras Gallery, Gallery of Medieval Art, Gallery of Old Masters, Gallery of 19th-century Art, and the Gallery of 20th and 21st-century, includes the works of Polish painters and sculptors and are displayed in the context of art in other countries and in different epochs. The galleries reflect the richness and diversity of traditions and historical experiences of individual nations, which, however, built their cultural identity on the same foundation of Greco-Roman antiquity and the Christian religion.

The Gallery of Medieval Art mainly presents objects from the late Middle Ages (14th-15th century), originating from different regions of today's Poland, as well as several examples of western European art. These works were originally designed almost exclusively for churches. The exhibition was designed to allow the audience to understand the role of art in the religious life of the Middle Ages.

The gallery presents trans-regional phenomena from the 12th–14th centuries, such as the distinction of figurative sculpture from architecture in the Romanesque era, Central European sculpture from the circle of the Madonnas on the Lion, and so-called International Gothic, also referred to as a courtly style. Many of the works included in the exhibition underline a distinct character of Central European regions such as Silesia between 1440 and 1520 (with large quartered polyptychs, epitaphs, votive and didactic plaques, and Ways of the Cross), Lesser Poland, Greater Poland and Kuyavia between 1440 and 1520 (with altarpieces and devotional paintings) and Gdańsk and the Hanseatic region between 1420 and 1520 (with large altars from Hamburg and Pomerania).

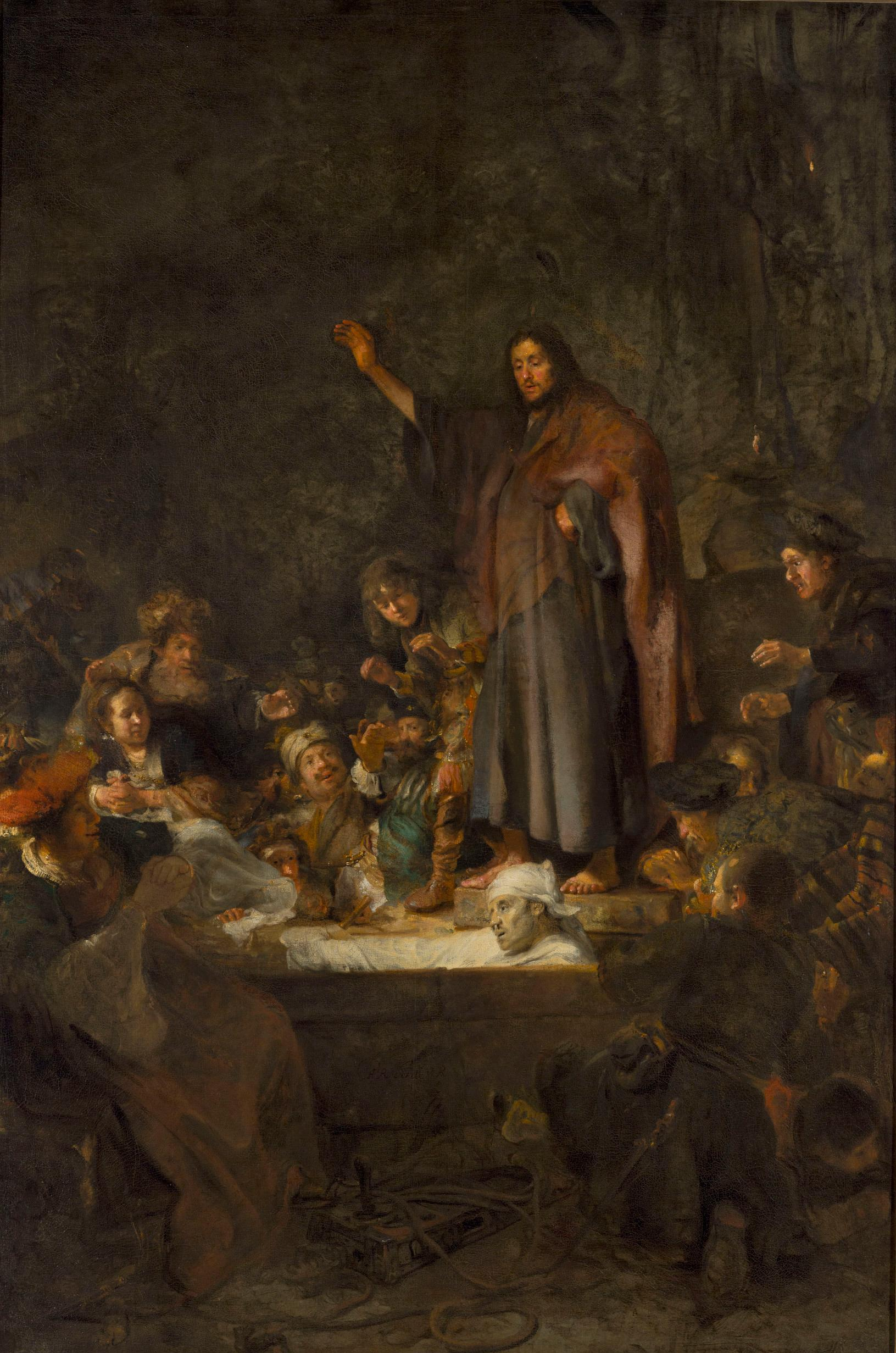
The Raising of Lazarus by Carel Fabritius is displayed in the Gallery of Old Masters

The new techniques implemented in the gallery allow the unabridged presentation of large polyptychs, such as the famous Grudziądz Polyptych, including the reverse of the wings. The new arrangement of the exhibition was designed by WWAA.

The Gallery of Old Masters on the second floor was conceived from the former Gallery of Decorative Art, Gallery of Old European Painting and the Gallery of Old Polish and European Portrait in 2016. It combines species of pictorial art - painting, sculpture, drawings and prints with crafts in reference to the very notion of "art" which originally meant craftsmanship. Painting and sculpture with its representational character and imitation of reality (mimesis) was united with decorative arts in common goals and functions as well as in spaces where they were collected and exhibited. These "social spaces" have provided the key to the division of the gallery:

1. palace, villa, court;
2. church, chapel and domestic altar;
3. the city. In other words:
4. court culture;
5. religious culture;
6. city culture.

In the redesigned gallery, the works are presented not according to national schools, but as a confrontation of artistic circles of the South and North. The new system reflects the hierarchy of the genres created by Renaissance art theory and the former function of the paintings. The aim of this exhibition is to show, for what purpose and for which recipients, works of art were created.

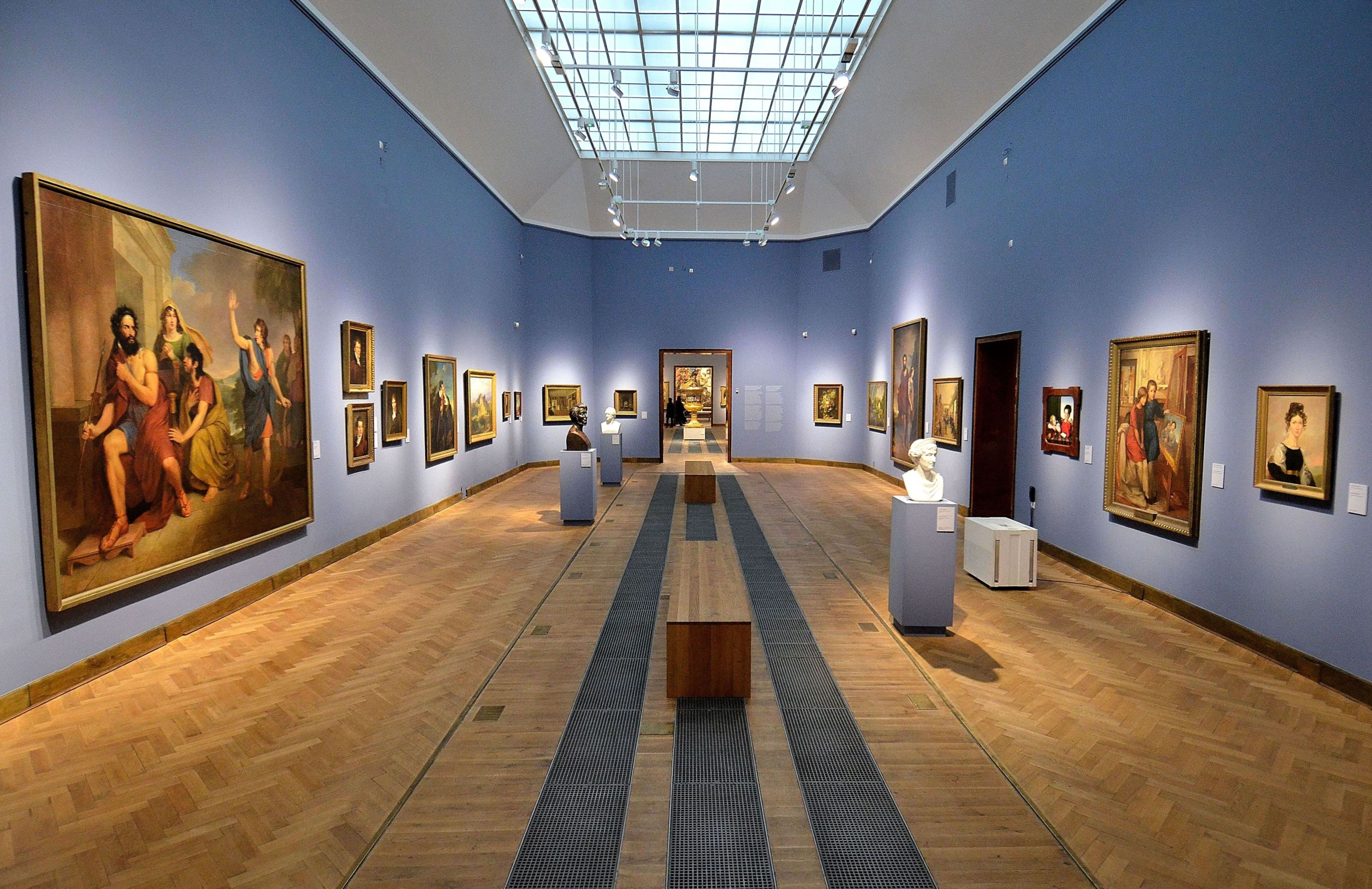
Gallery of 19th-century Art

The gallery shows a variety of effigies, reflecting the multiplicity of social, political and private functions of portraiture. The exhibition opens with monumental images of courtly and aristocratic portraits and busts compiled with some examples of traditional Polish and Western European portraits en pied and followed with smaller, less formal, or private portraits, coffin portraits and 18th-century portraits followed with miniature portraits and paintings of Stanislaus Augustus' era on the first floor.

The core of the new exhibition of the Gallery of 19th-century Art, presenting the main trends shaping the art in the nineteenth century, is the work of Polish painters and sculptors, which is present in the context of selected works by representatives of other nationalities. Confrontation of works by artists from different European countries shows their artistic aspirations, universal ideas or symbols, similar experiments carried out independently or in workshop practice. One of Poland's largest canvas paintings, the Battle of Grunwald by Jan Matejko (426 cm × 987 cm; 168 in × 389 in), is displayed in the Gallery of 19th-century Art.

Collections of modern and contemporary art are among the largest in Poland. Paintings, sculptures, prints and drawings from the 1920s and 1930s, Polish avant-garde film, photographs, photomontages, along with selected works of the 1980s independent culture, video and performance of the last forty years are exhibited in a 700 m^{2} gallery. Information about the selected objects is available through mobile applications and selected works are visualised and described by the gallery curator thanks to augmented reality.

== Collection ==
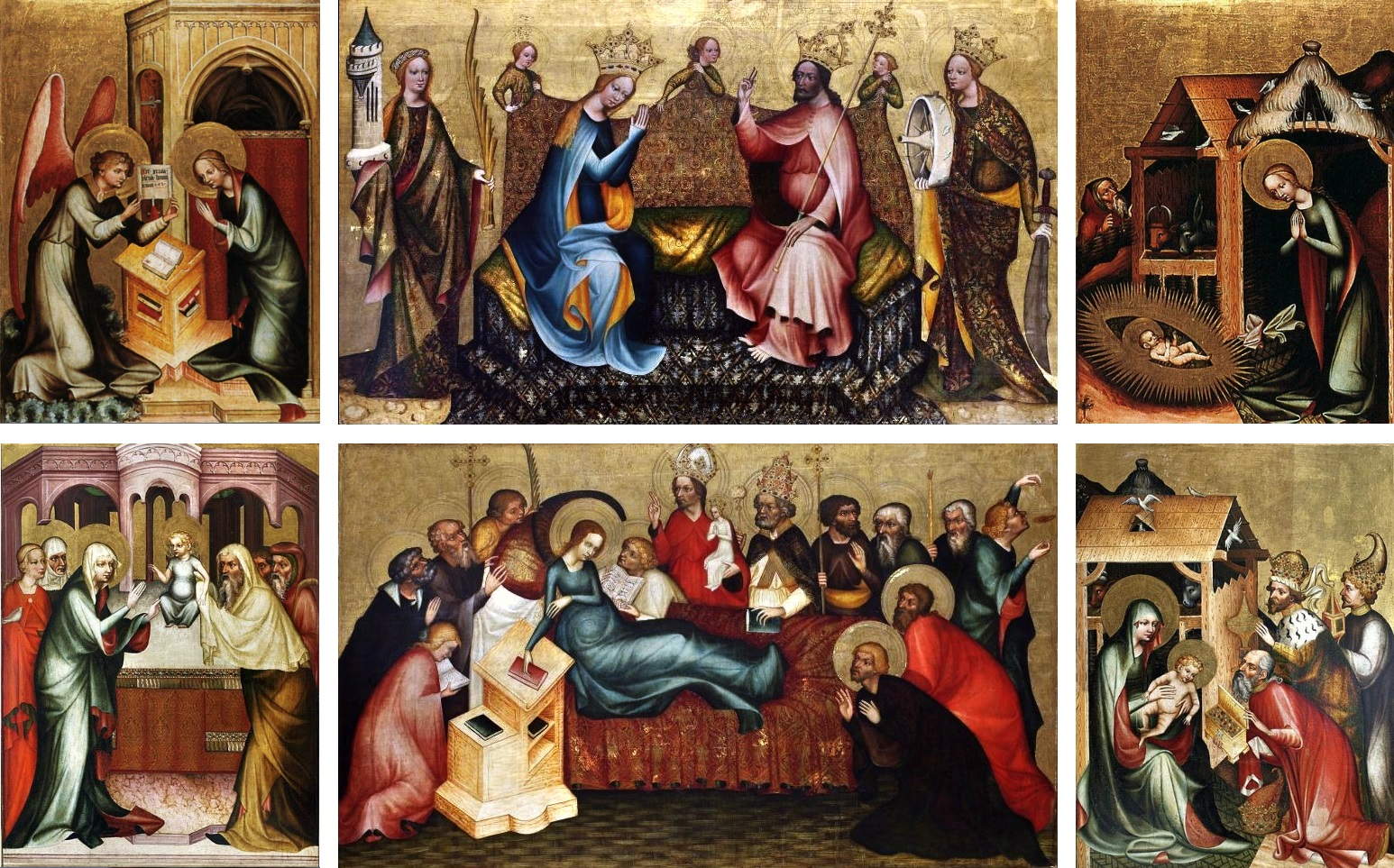
Grudziądz Polyptych, ca. 1400

Collections of the National Museum in Warsaw comprise about 830,000 exhibits of Polish and foreign art, from antiquity to the present, and include paintings, sculptures, drawings, engravings, photographs and coins as well as objects of applied art and design.

The Collection of Ancient and East Christian Art numbers some 24,000 exhibits, being the largest and most important of its kind in Poland. The collection of frescoes from the Christian cathedral in Faras (ancient Pachoras in today's Sudan) and a collection of painted Greek vases are among the most important.

The origins of the Old European Painting Collection, comprising 3,700 paintings, dates back to 1862 and the establishment of the Museum of Fine Arts, when 36 Italian, Dutch and German paintings from Johann Peter Weyer collection in Cologne were acquired. The museum came into possession of the works of such masters as Pinturicchio, Cornelis van Haarlem and Jacob Jordaens. The collection was enlarged through purchases, donations and deposits. The most significant acquisition was the collection of paintings of Pietro Fiorentini, donated in 1858 to the School of Fine Arts in Warsaw, and given to the museum in 1879. The collection was further expanded through the purchase of paintings from the collection of Wojciech Kolasiński in the years 1877–1896 and bequests by Cyprian Lachnicki in 1906 including Flagellation of Christ by Pieter de Kempeneer, Portrait of a man in a yellow jerkin by Hans Schäufelein, Expulsion from Paradise by Pier Francesco Mola and Academic study by Jean Auguste Dominique Ingres.

In 1935 the museum purchased a large collection of Jan Popławski, including Portrait of Admiral by Tintoretto, and in 1961 a collection of Gabriela Zapolska, including several paintings by Paul Sérusier. The collection of Polish modern art gained a more international context with the purchase of Portrait of Tadeusz Makowski by Marcel Gromaire in 1959 and Lassitude by an Art Deco painter Tamara de Lempicka in 1979, both on permanent display. The museum also features the works of other major European artists such as Rembrandt, Sandro Botticelli, Lucas Cranach the Elder, Auguste Renoir, Gustave Courbet, Angelica Kauffmann, Luca Giordano, Mattia Preti, Joos van Cleve, Jan Brueghel the Elder, David Teniers the Younger and Gaspare Traversi.

The gallery displays a large collection of Polish history paintings of the 19th century, many of which are well-known in Polish culture, vividly depicting various incidents from the nation's history.

=== Collection highlights ===
==== Foreign Painting ====
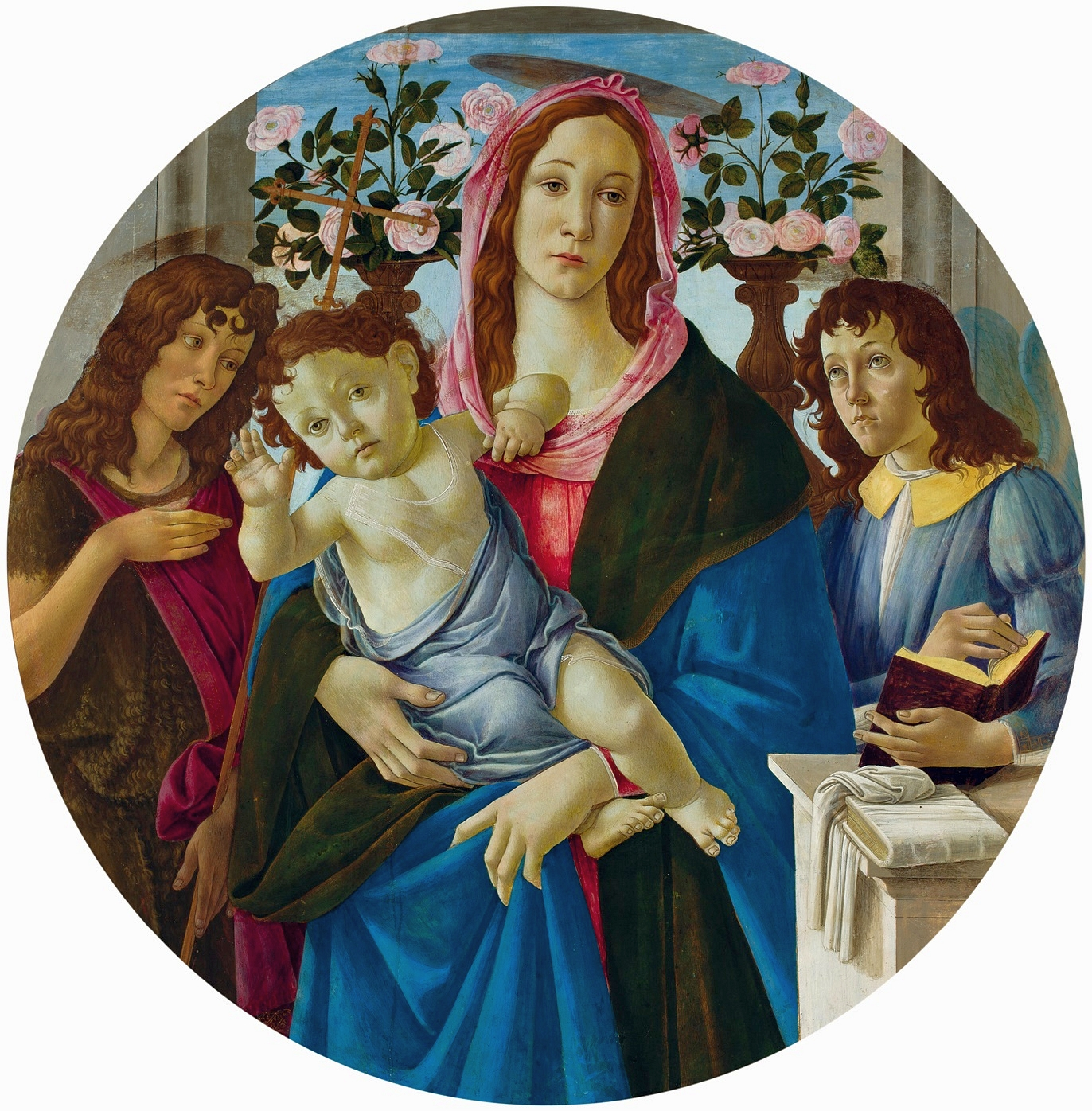
Madonna and Child, Sandro Botticelli

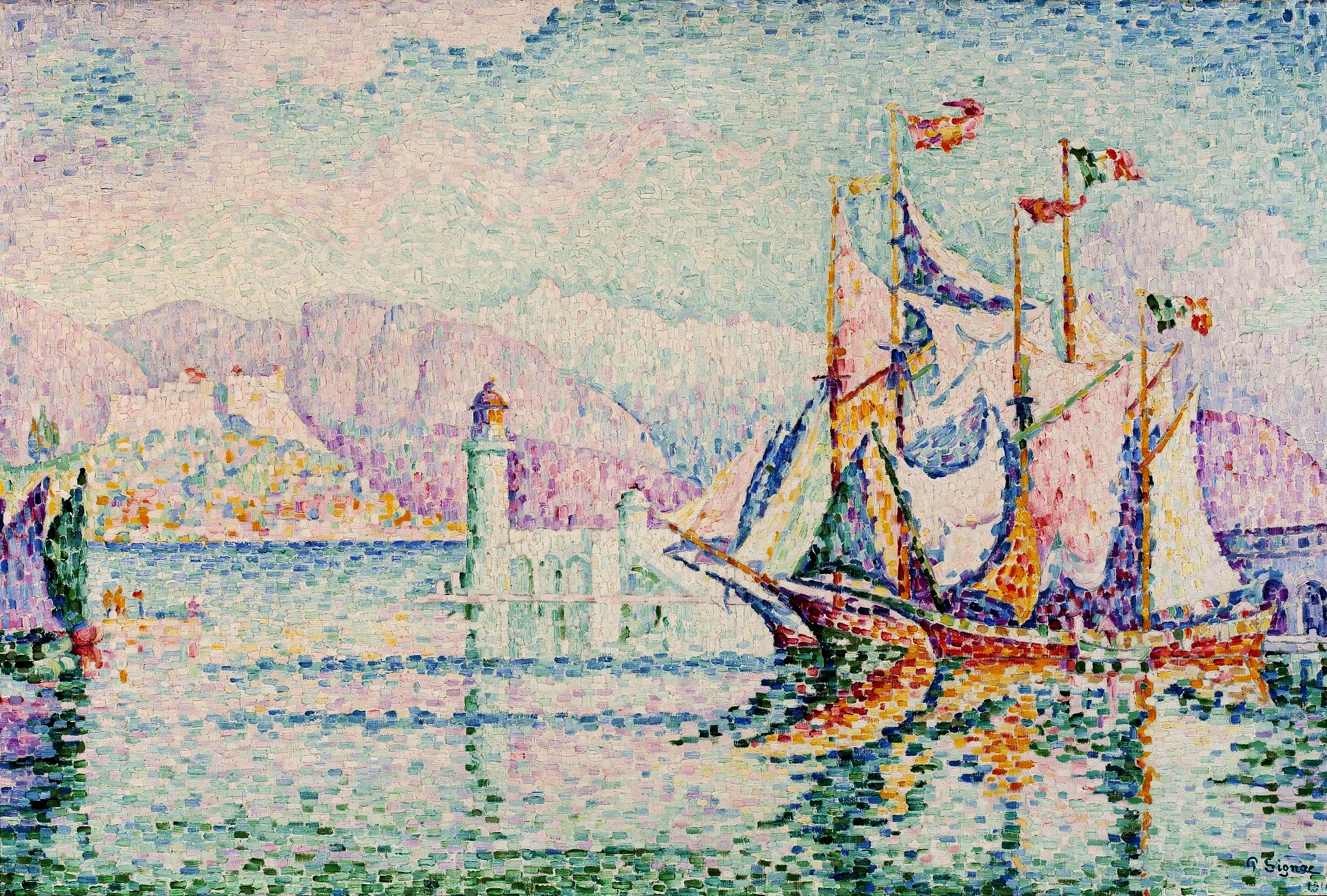
Antibes - Morning, Paul Signac

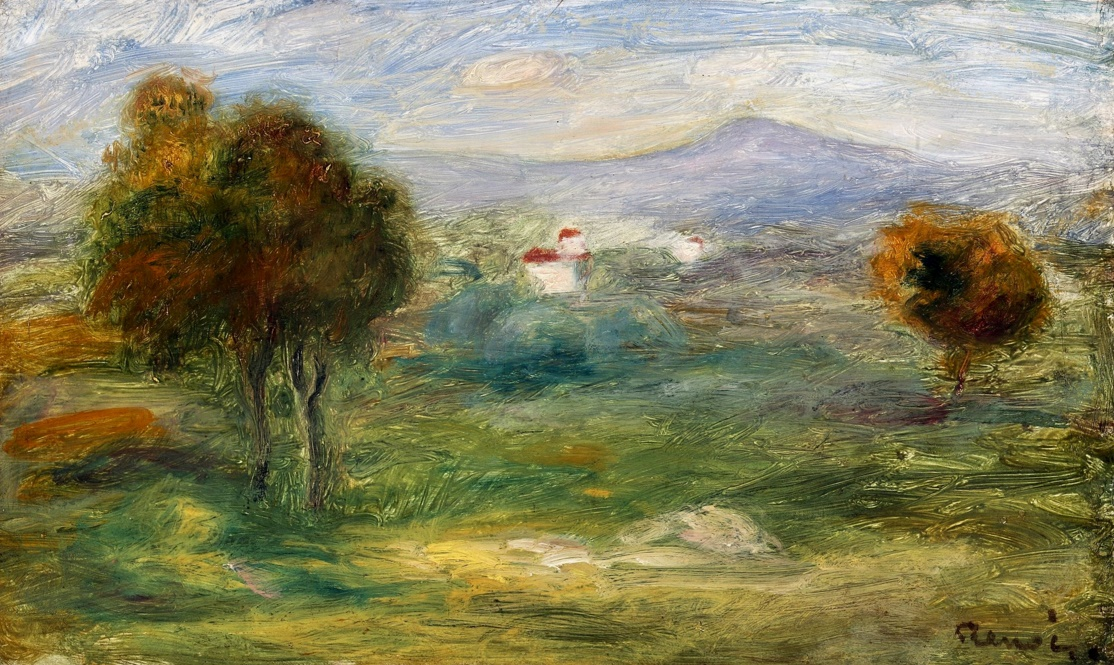
Landscape near Cros-de-Cagnes, Pierre-Auguste Renoir

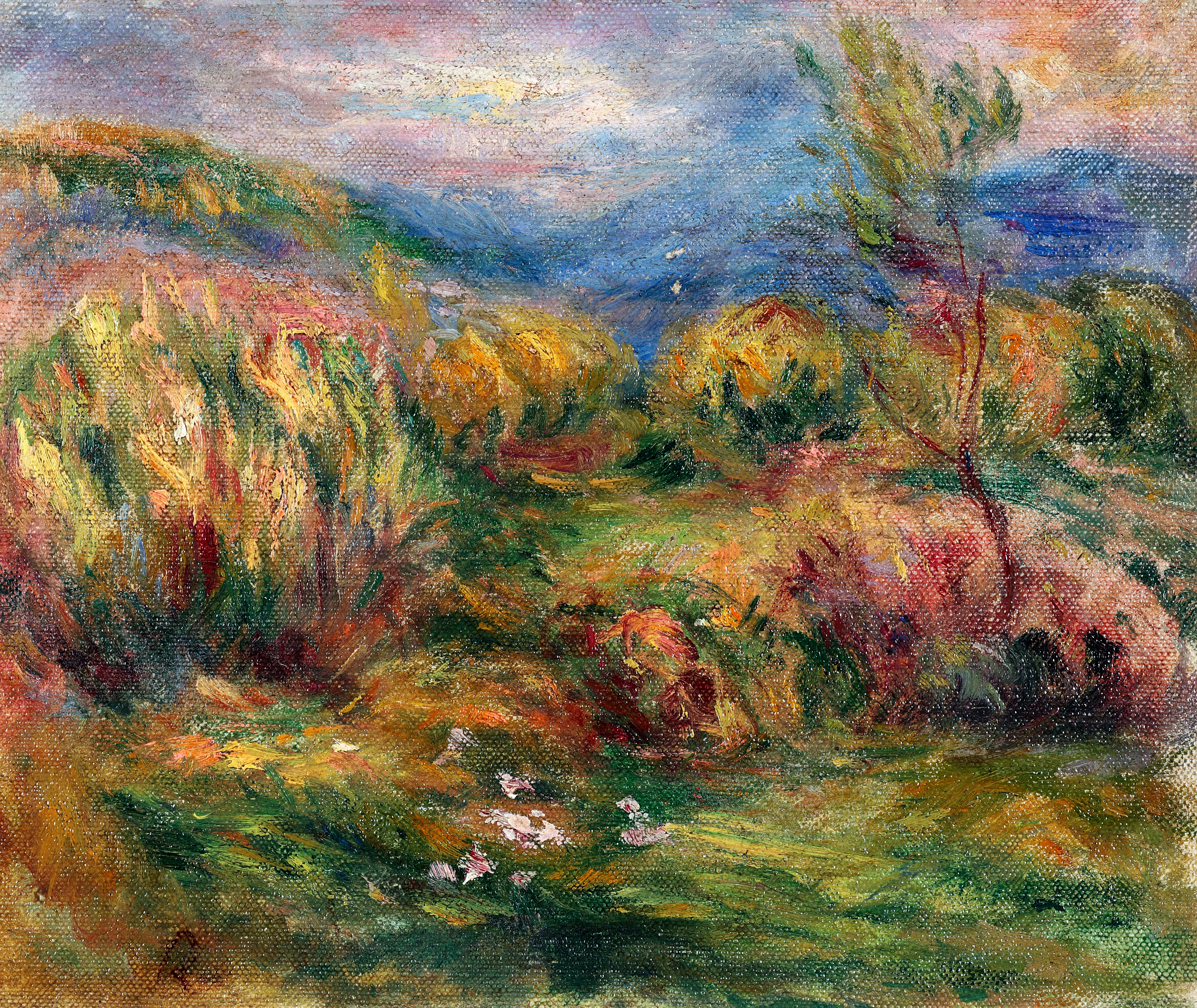
Landscape near Cagnes-sur-Mer, Pierre-Auguste Renoir

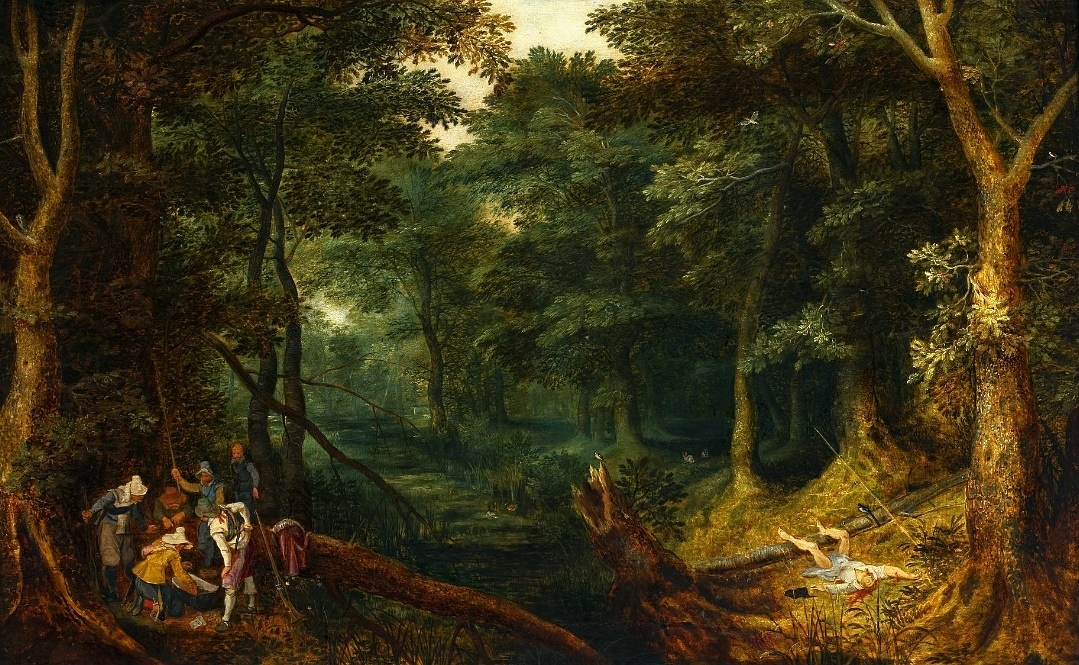
Landscape with Robbers Sharing Loot, Jan Brueghel the Elder

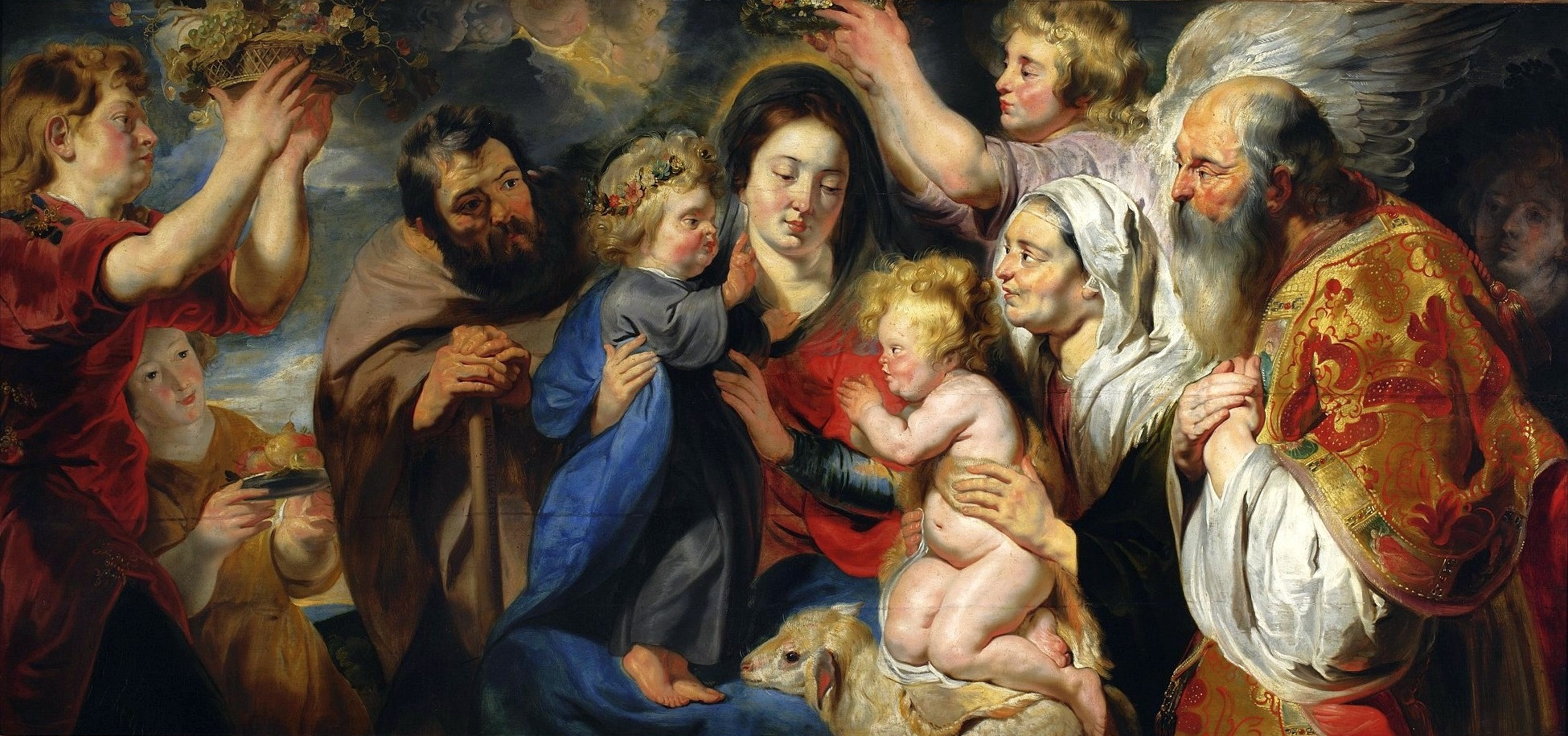
Holy Family with Saint John, Jacob Jordaens

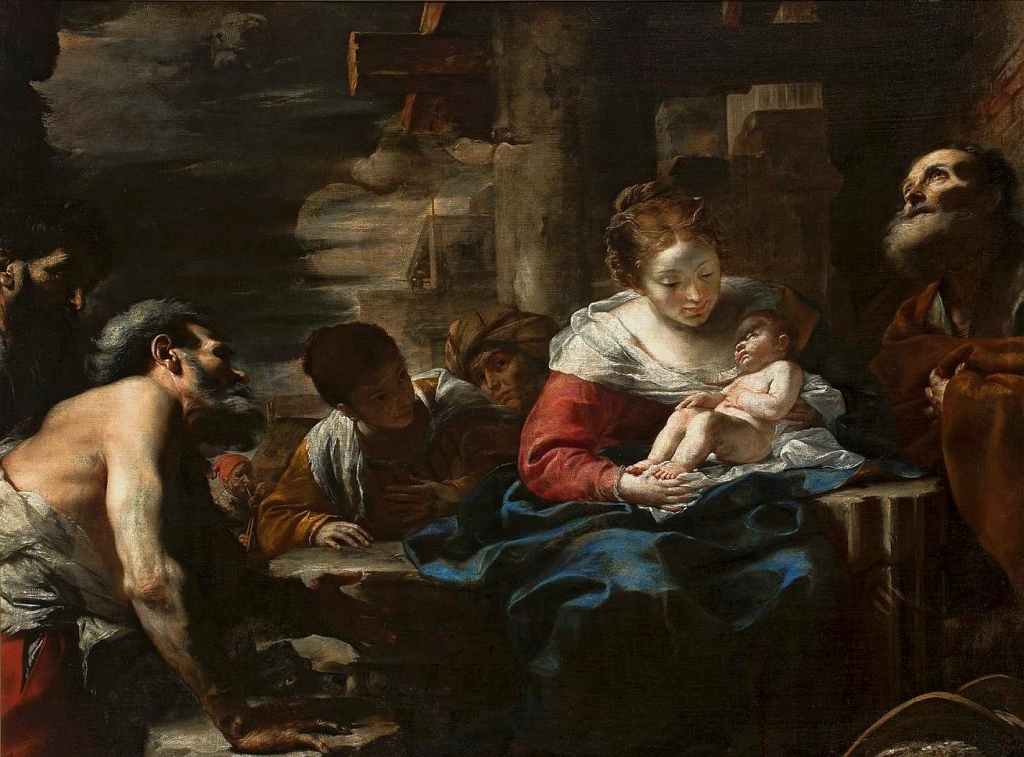
Adoration of the Shepherds, Mattia Preti

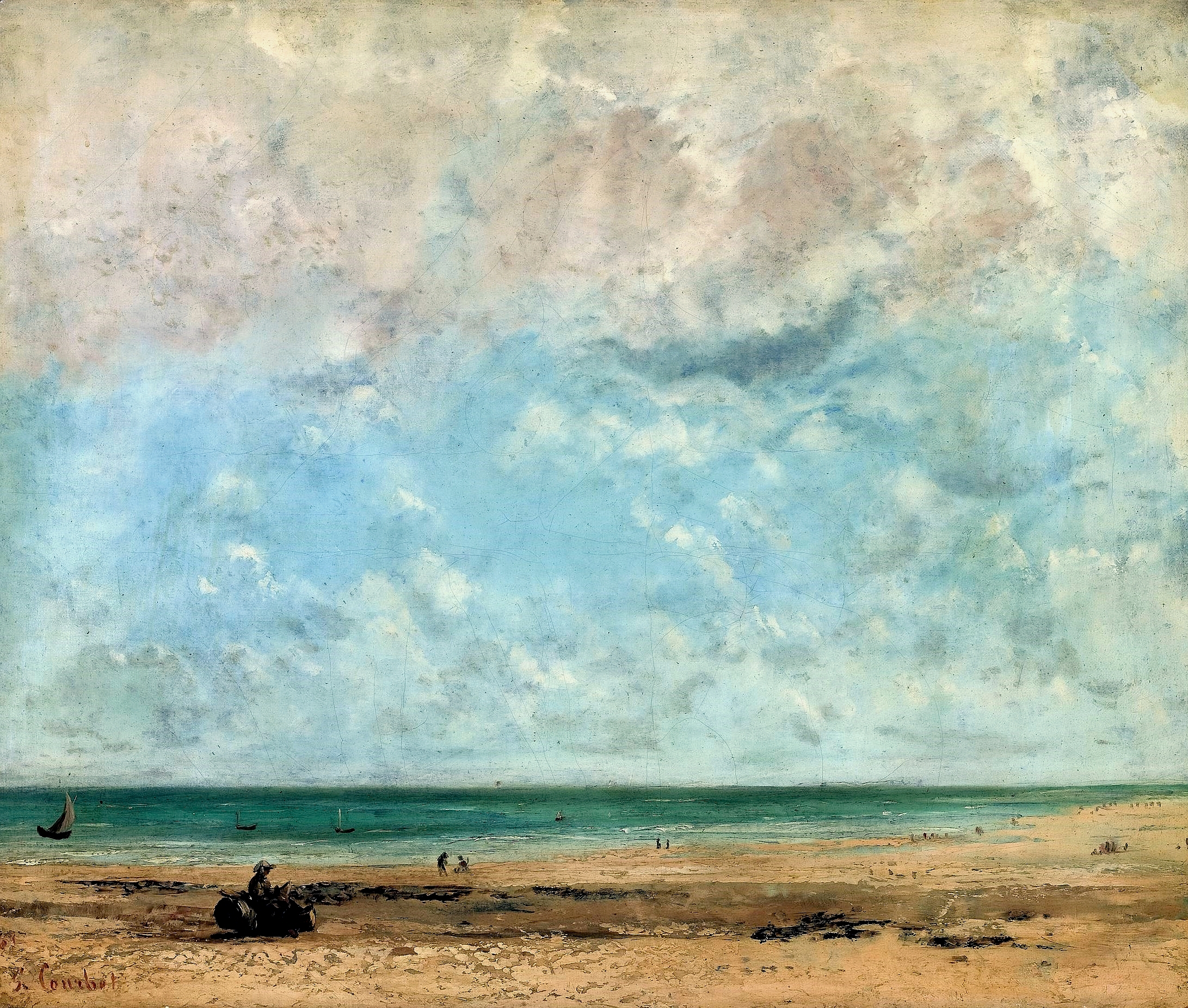
Seashore, Gustave Courbet

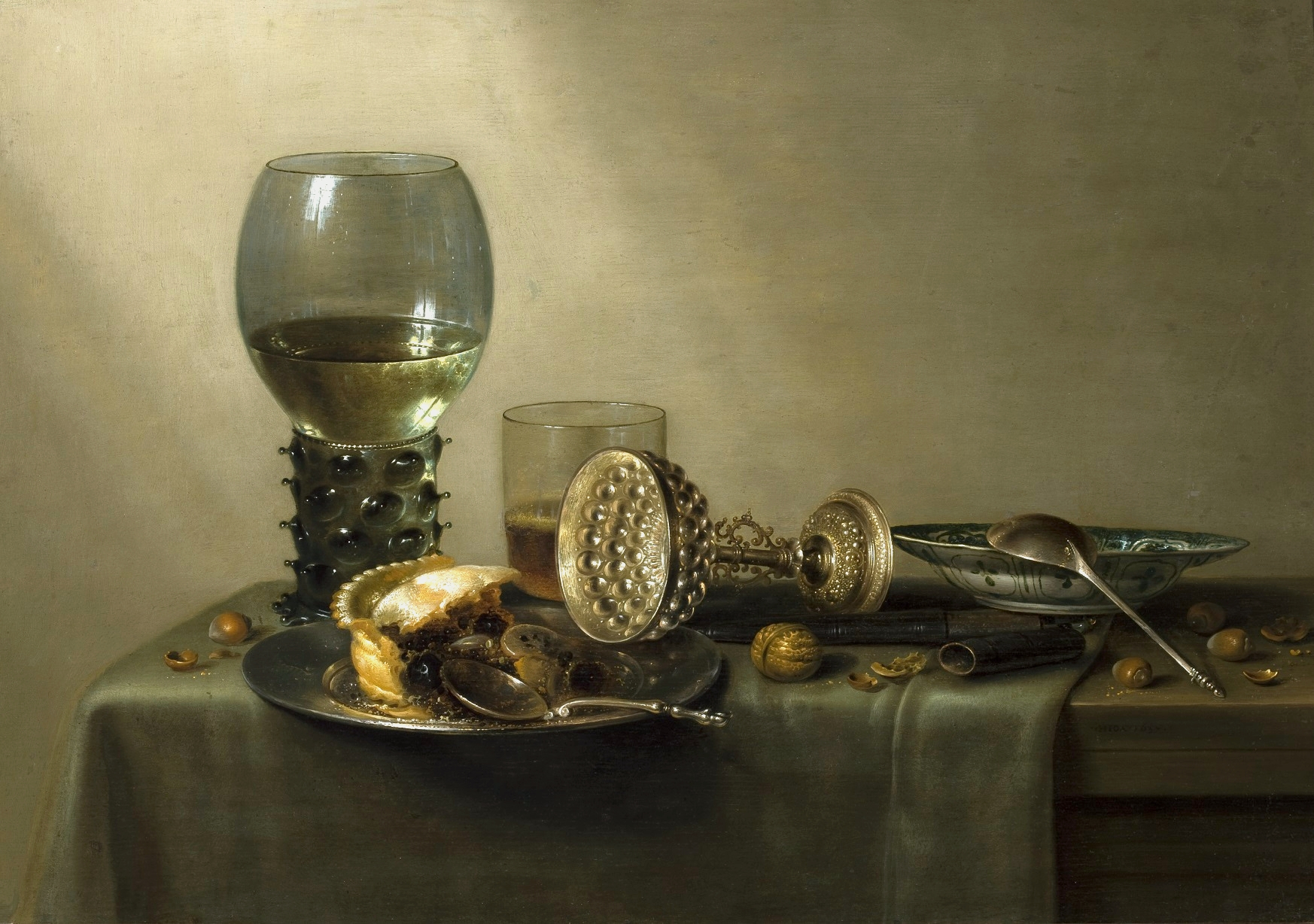
Dessert, Willem Claesz. Heda

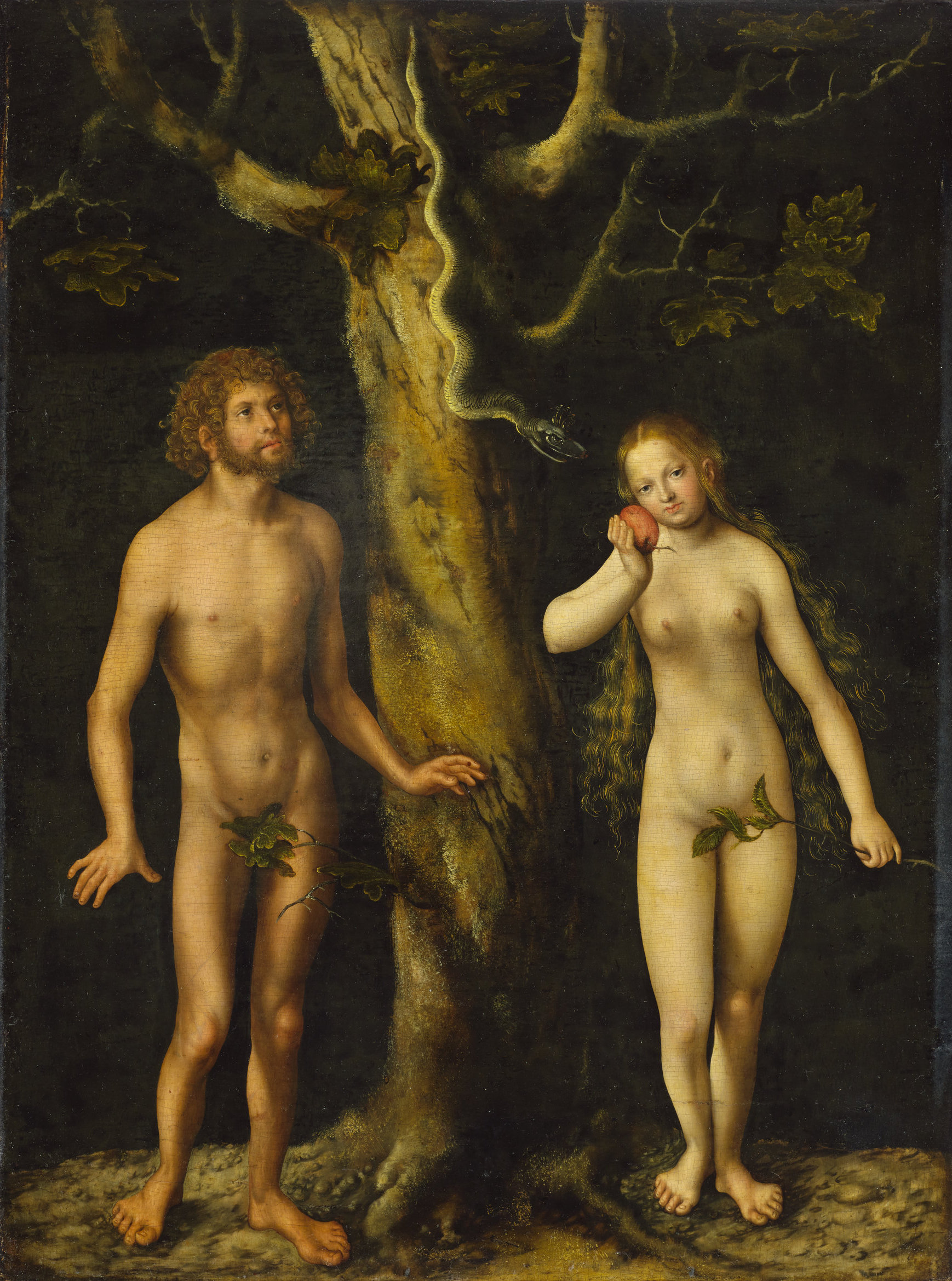
Adam and Eve, Lucas Cranach the Elder

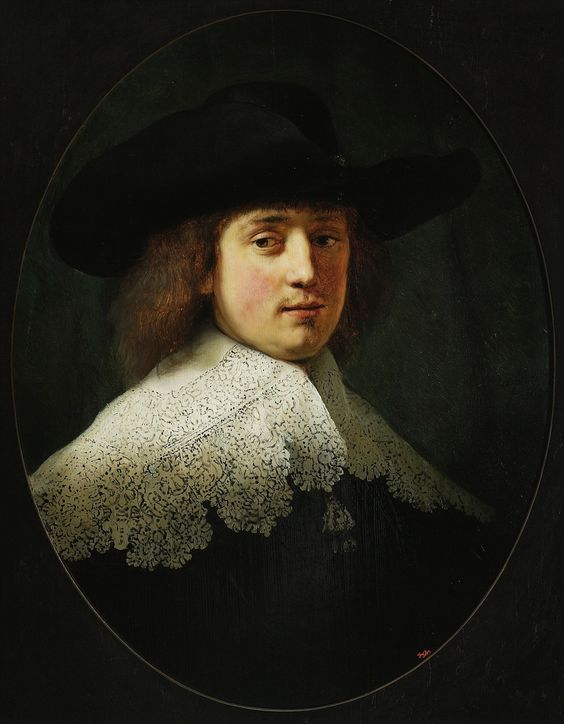
Maerten Soolmans, Rembrandt

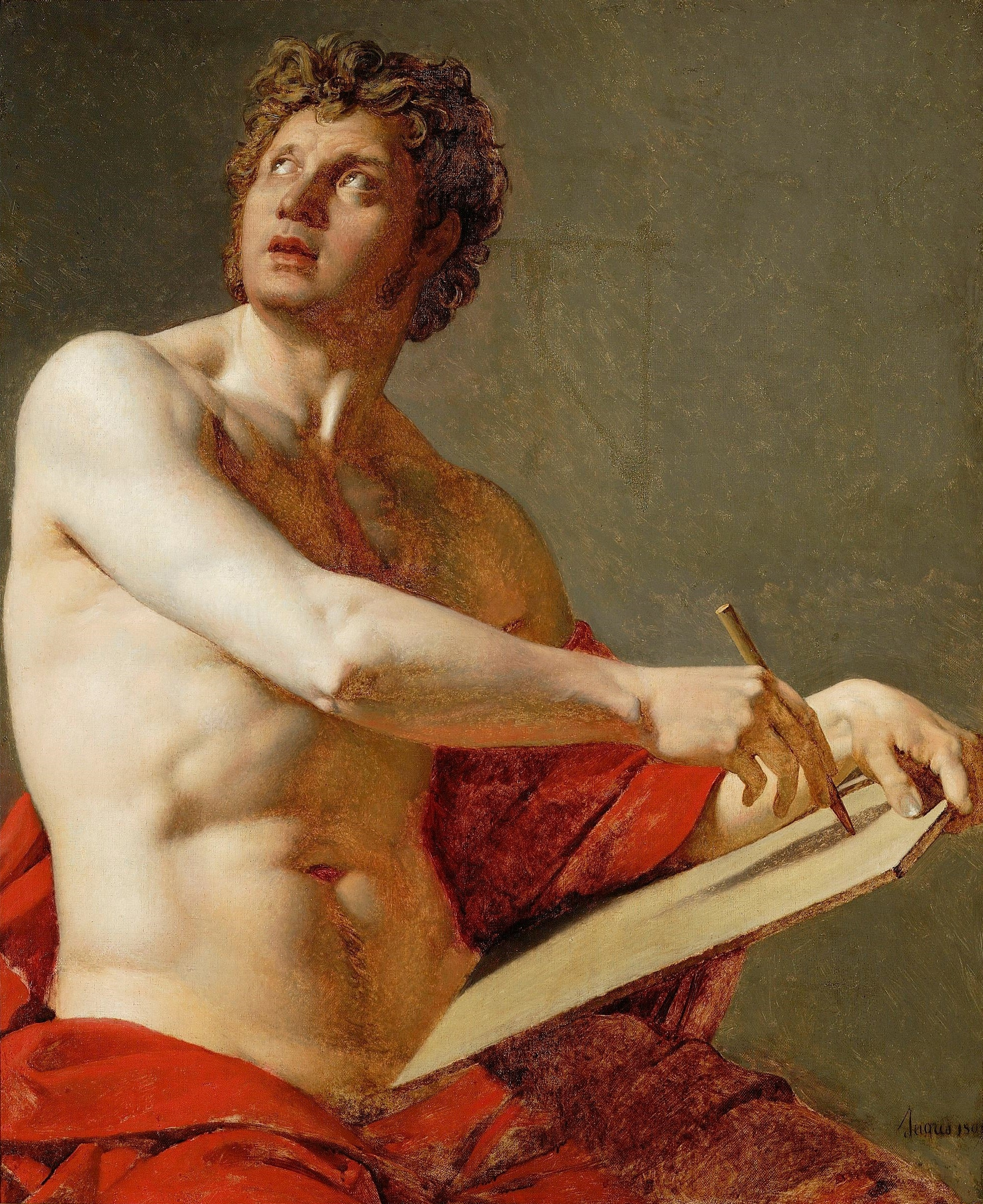
Academic Study, Jean Auguste Dominique Ingres

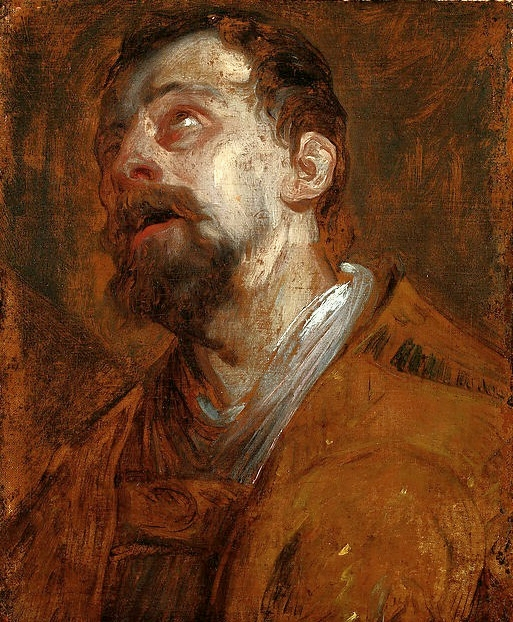
Study of a Saint, Anthony van Dyck

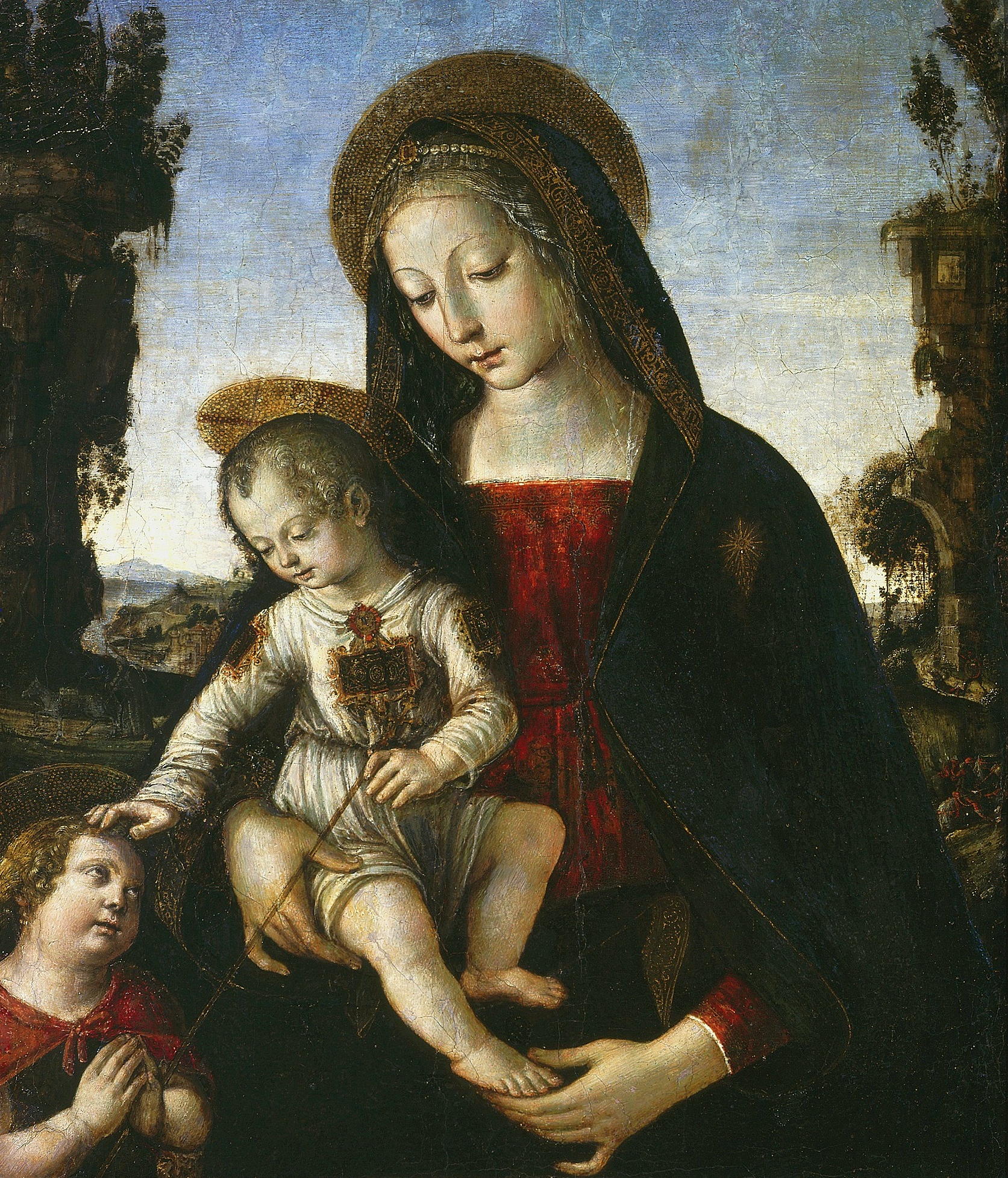
Virgin and Child with the Infant St John the Baptist, Pinturicchio

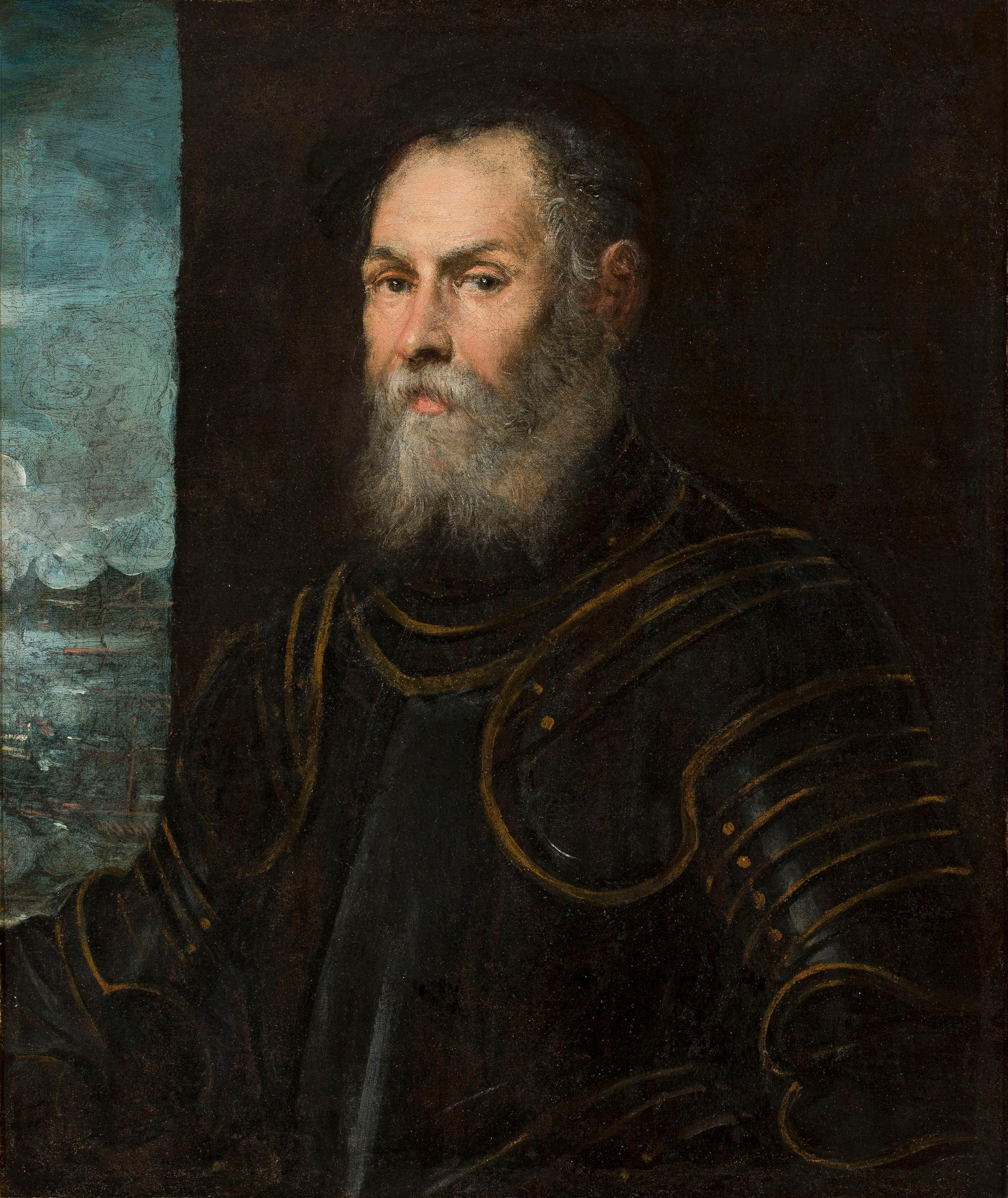
Portrait of a Venetian Admiral, Tintoretto

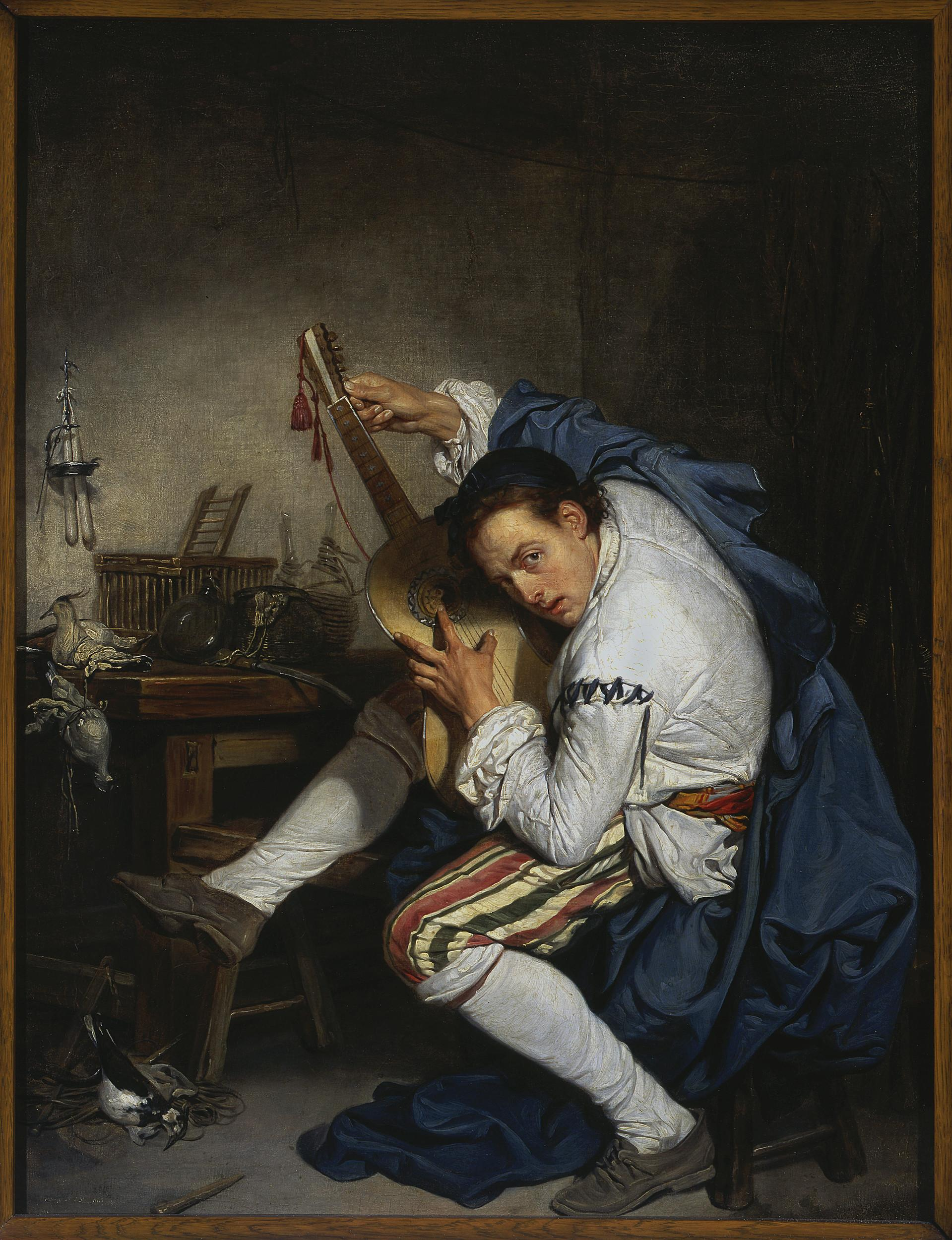
The Guitar Player, Jean-Baptiste Greuze

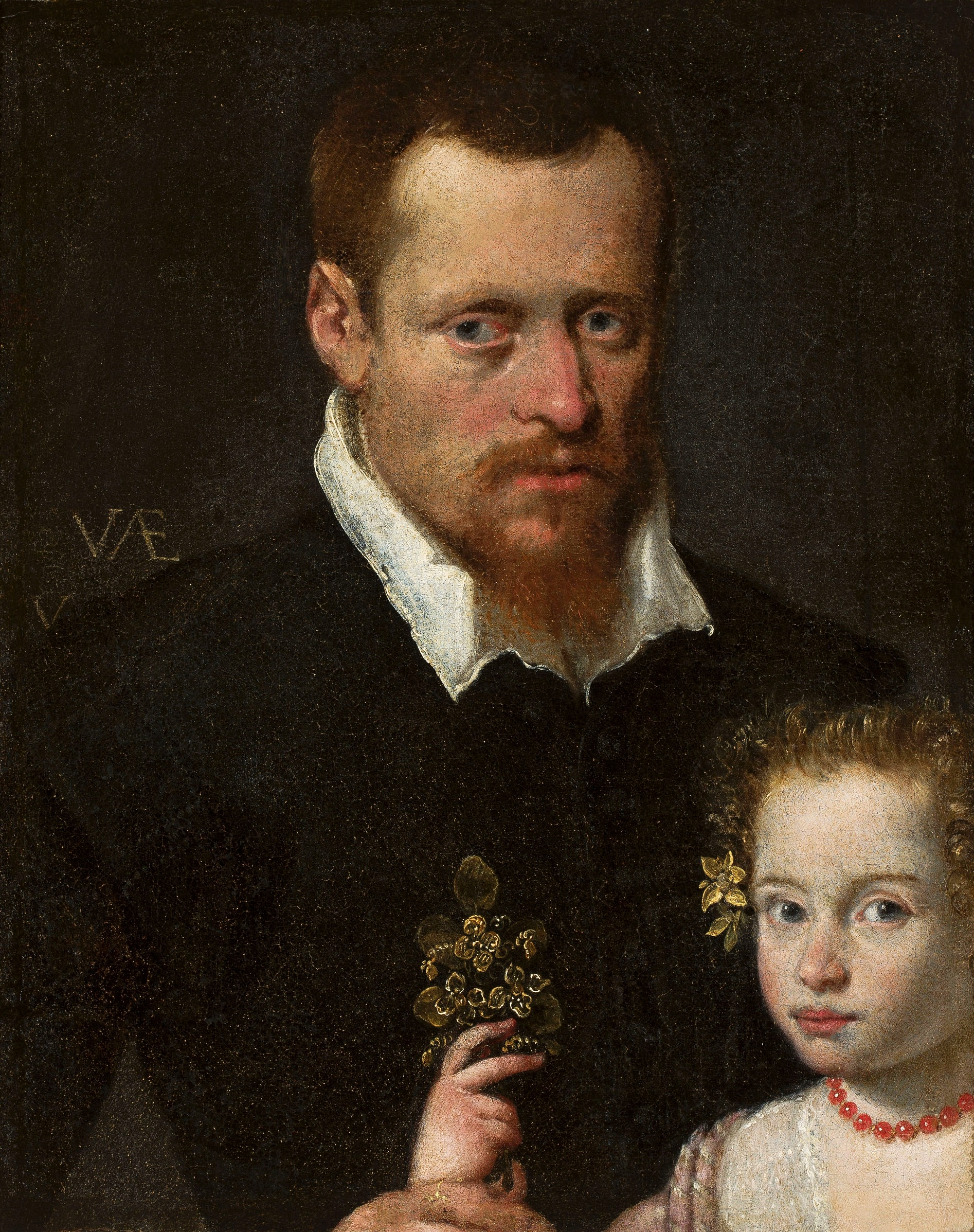
A Man With His Daughter, Sofonisba Anguissola

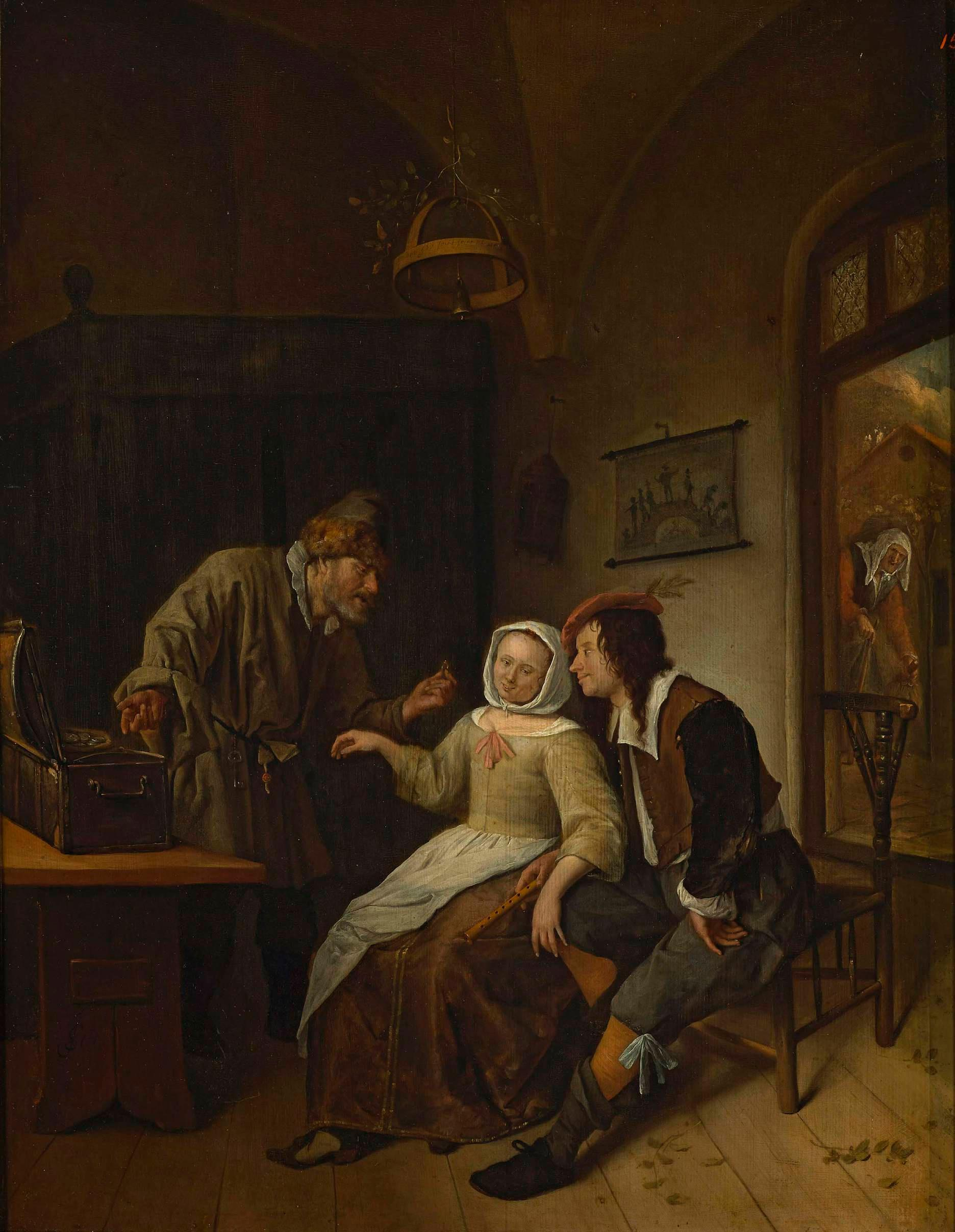
Choice Between Youth and Wealth, Jan Steen

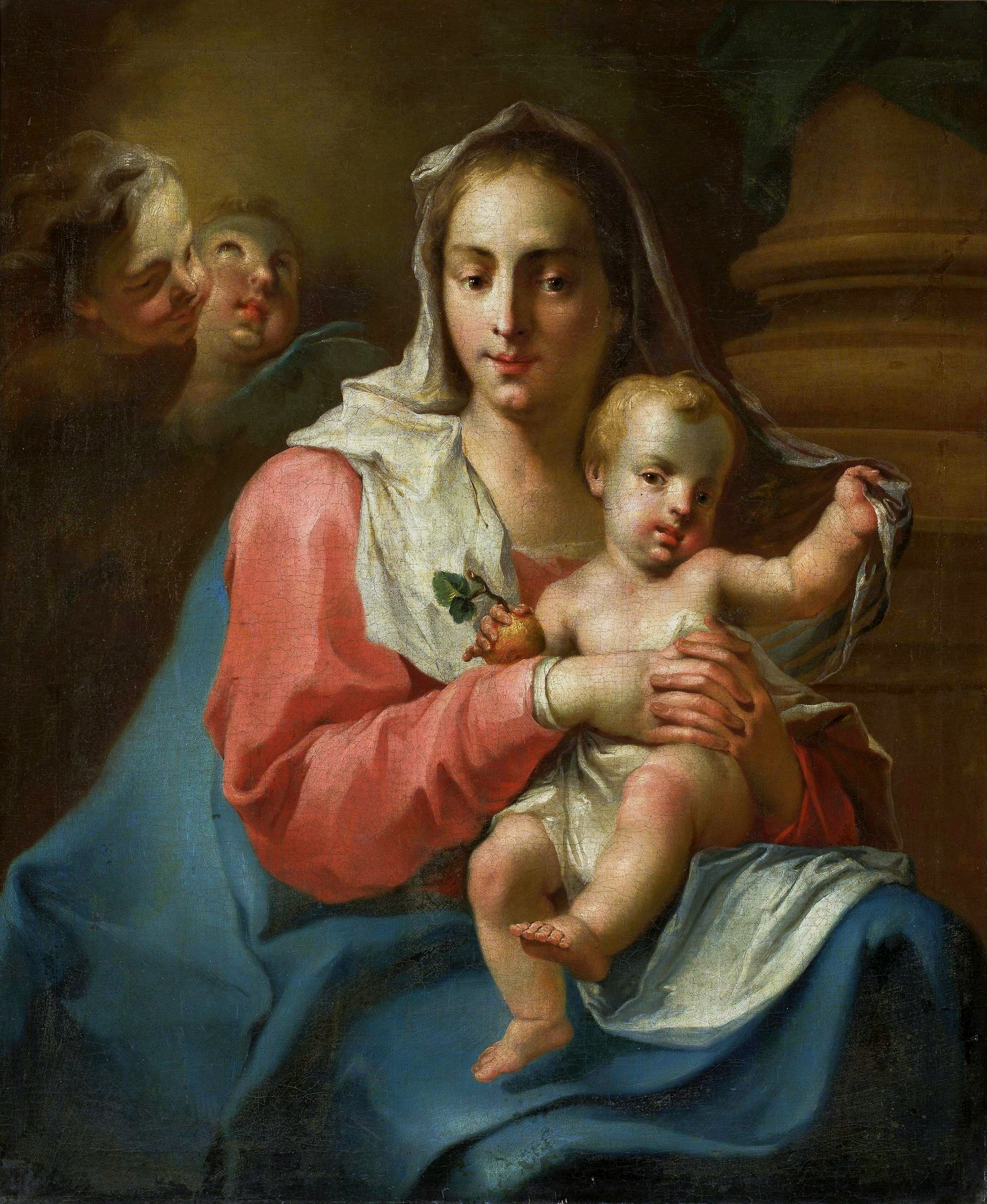
Madonna And Child With Two Angels, Giambattista Pittoni

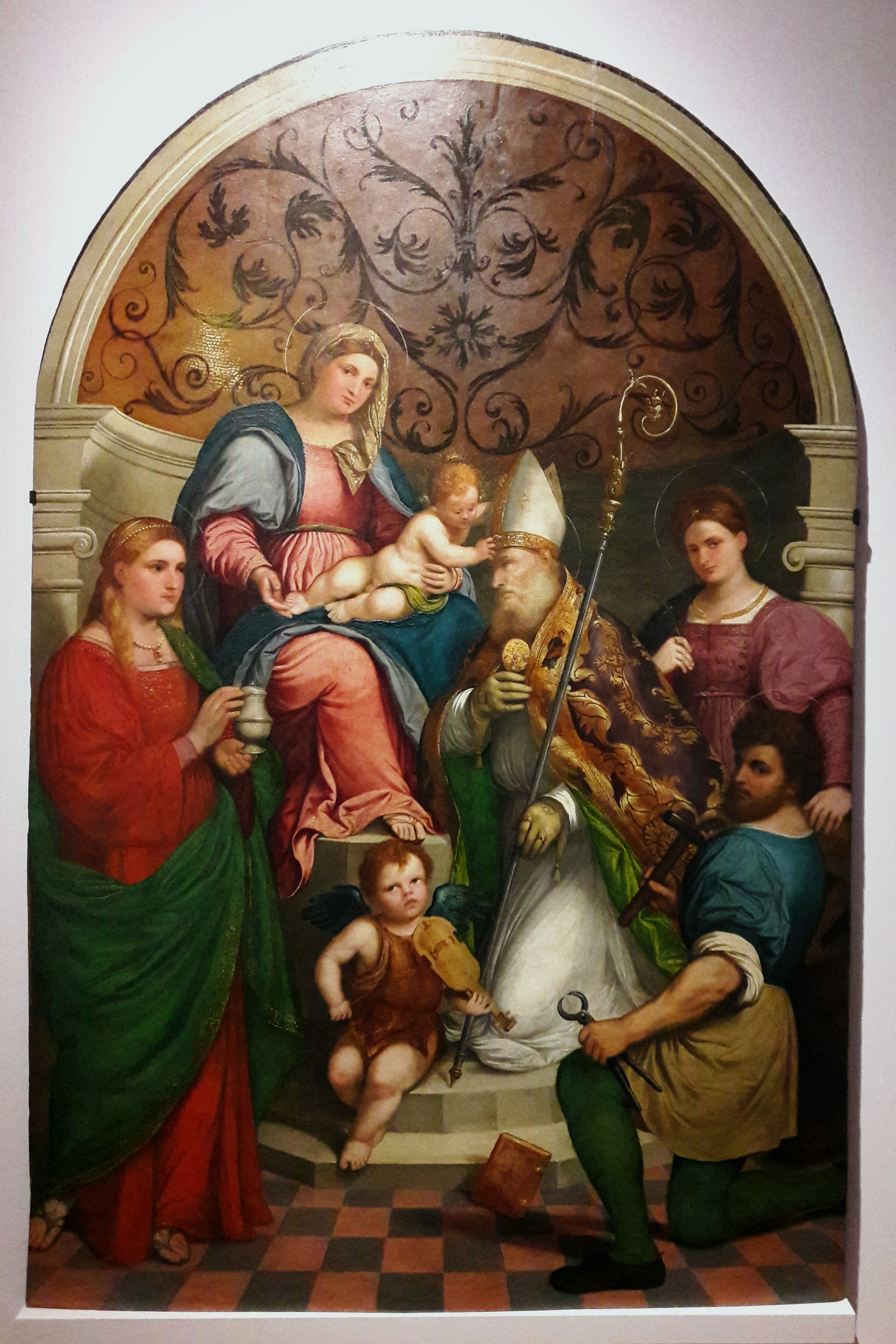
Sacra Conversazione, Paris Bordone

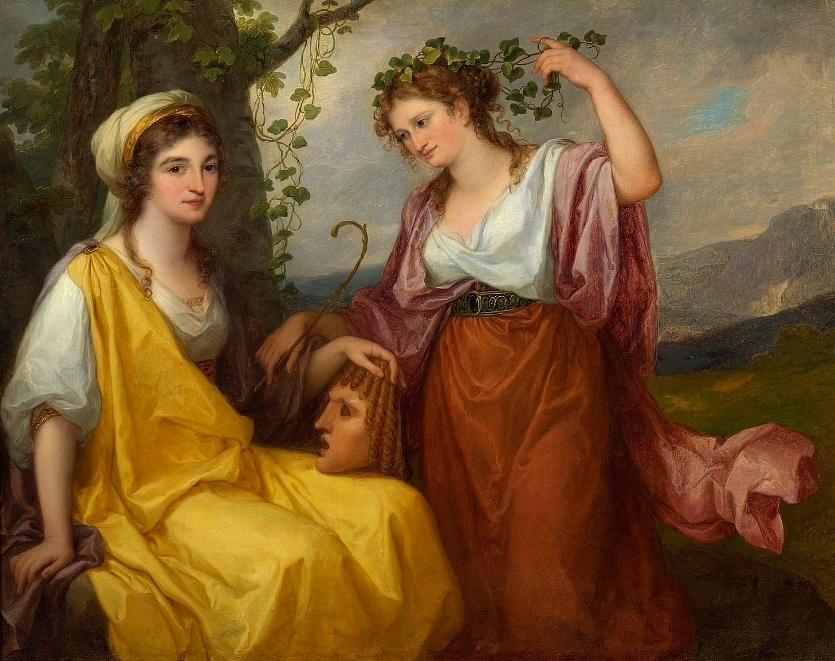
Tragedy and Comedy, Angelica Kauffmann

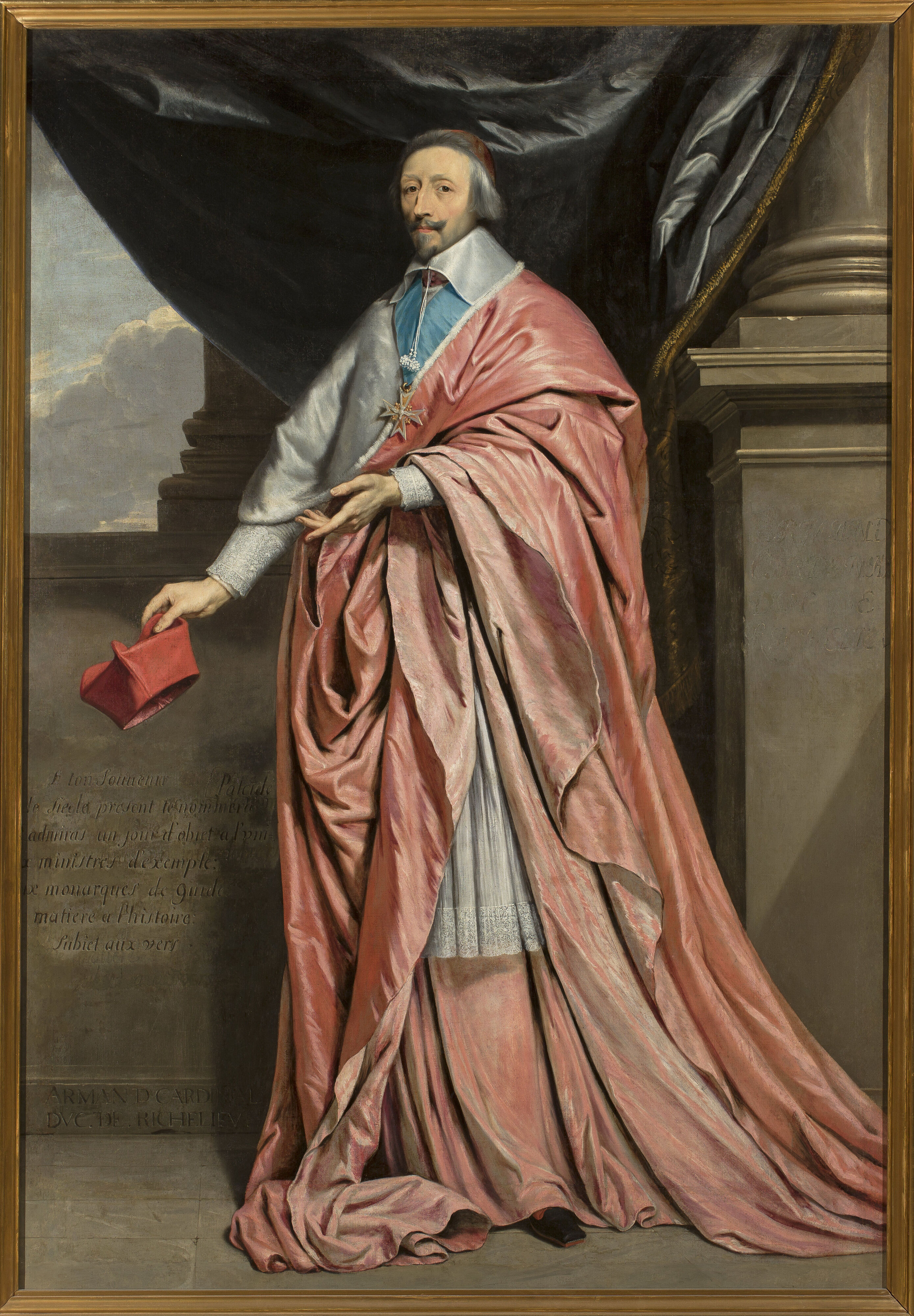
Portrait of Cardinal Richelieu, Philippe de Champaigne

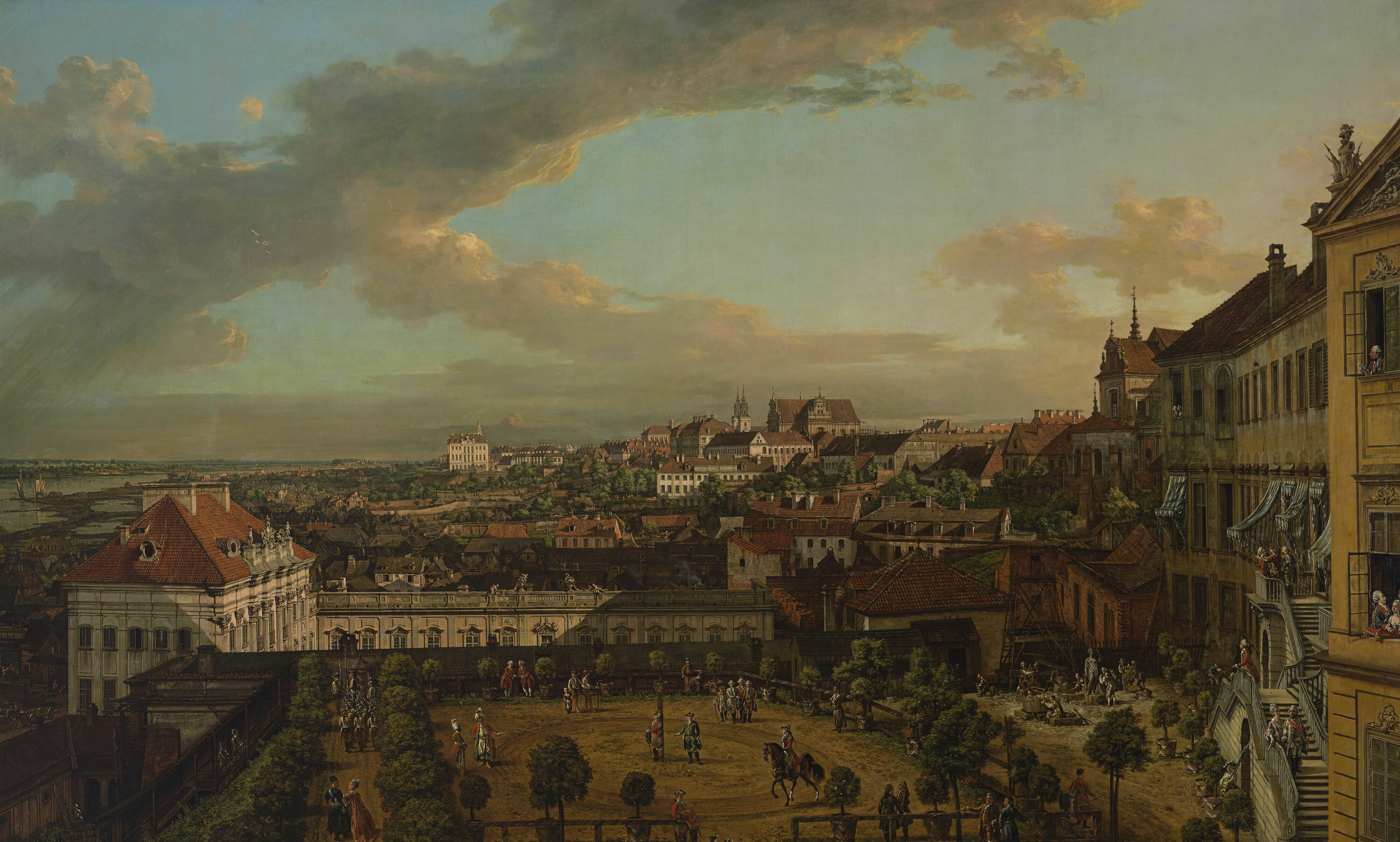
View of Warsaw from the Terrace of the Royal Castle, Bernardo Bellotto

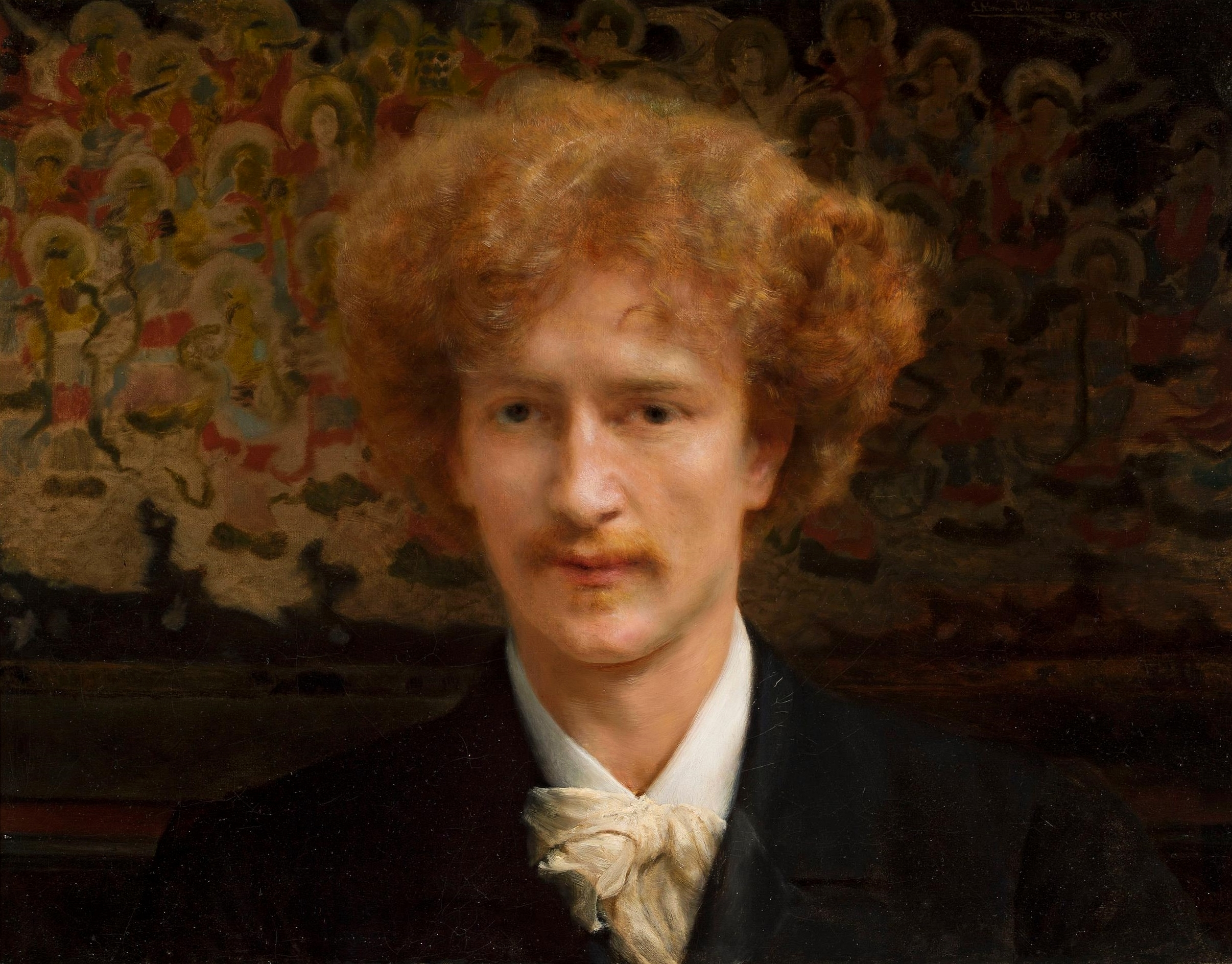
Portrait of Ignacy Jan Paderewski, Lawrence Alma-Tadema

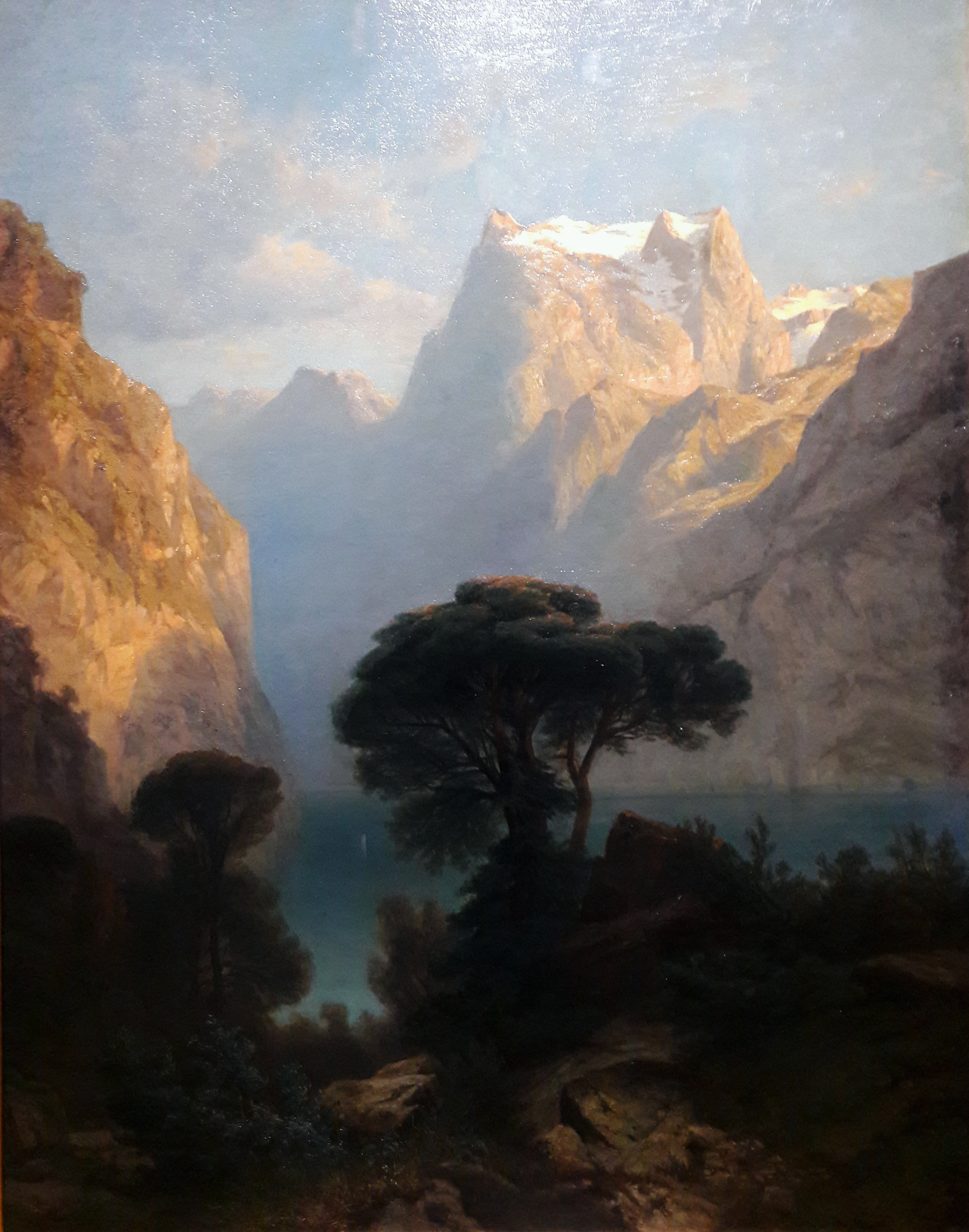
Lake of Four Cantons, Alexandre Calame

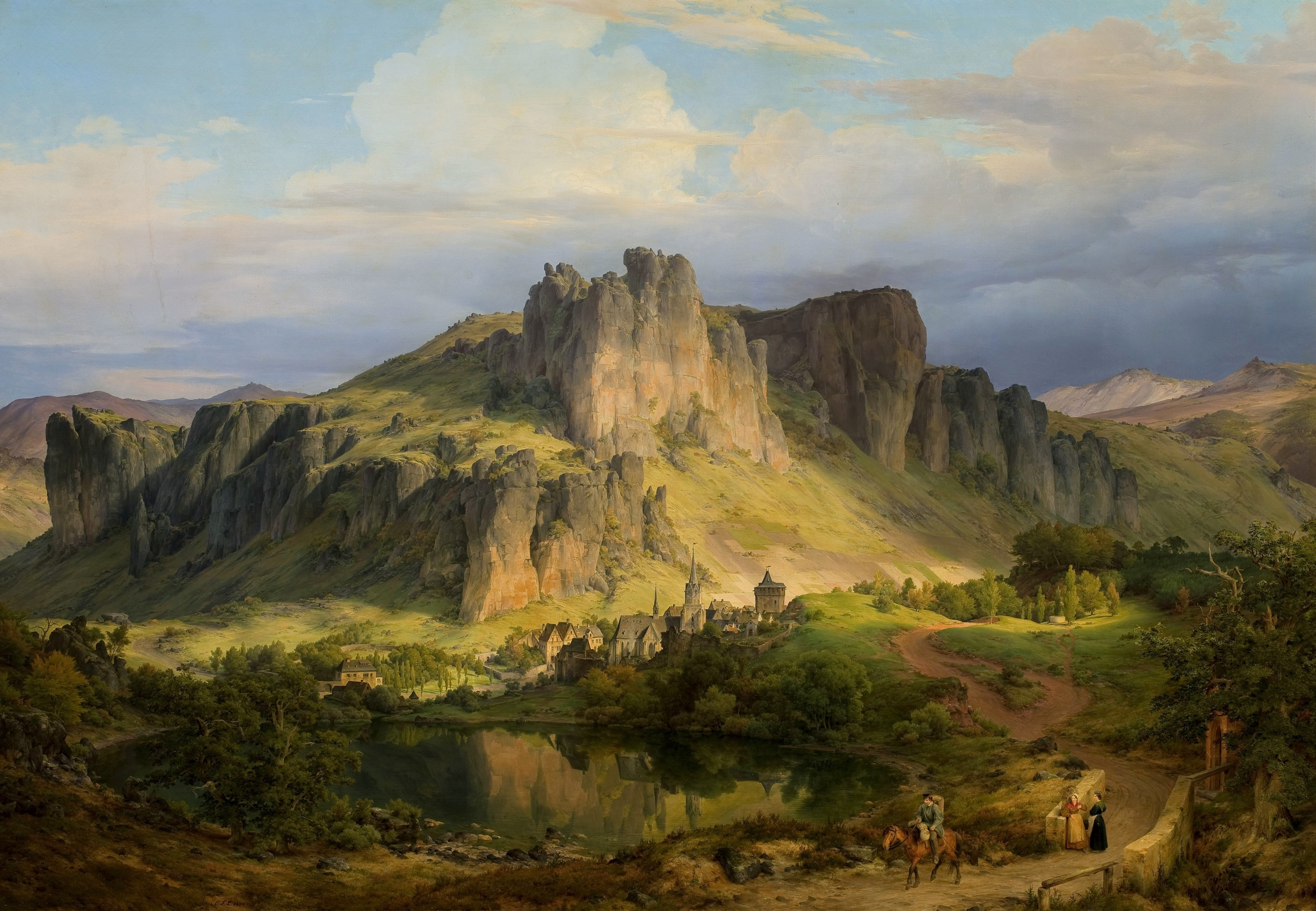
Landscape from the Eifel mountains, Karl Friedrich Lessing

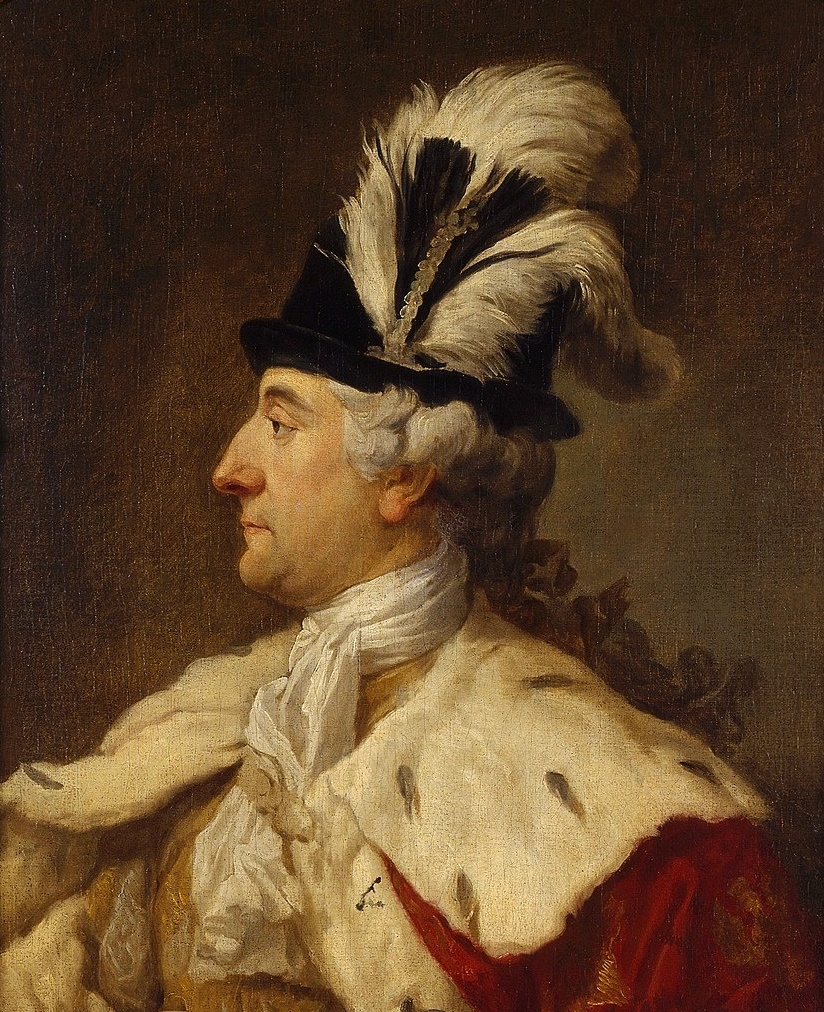
Portrait of King Stanislaus Augustus in a Feathered Hat, Marcello Bacciarelli

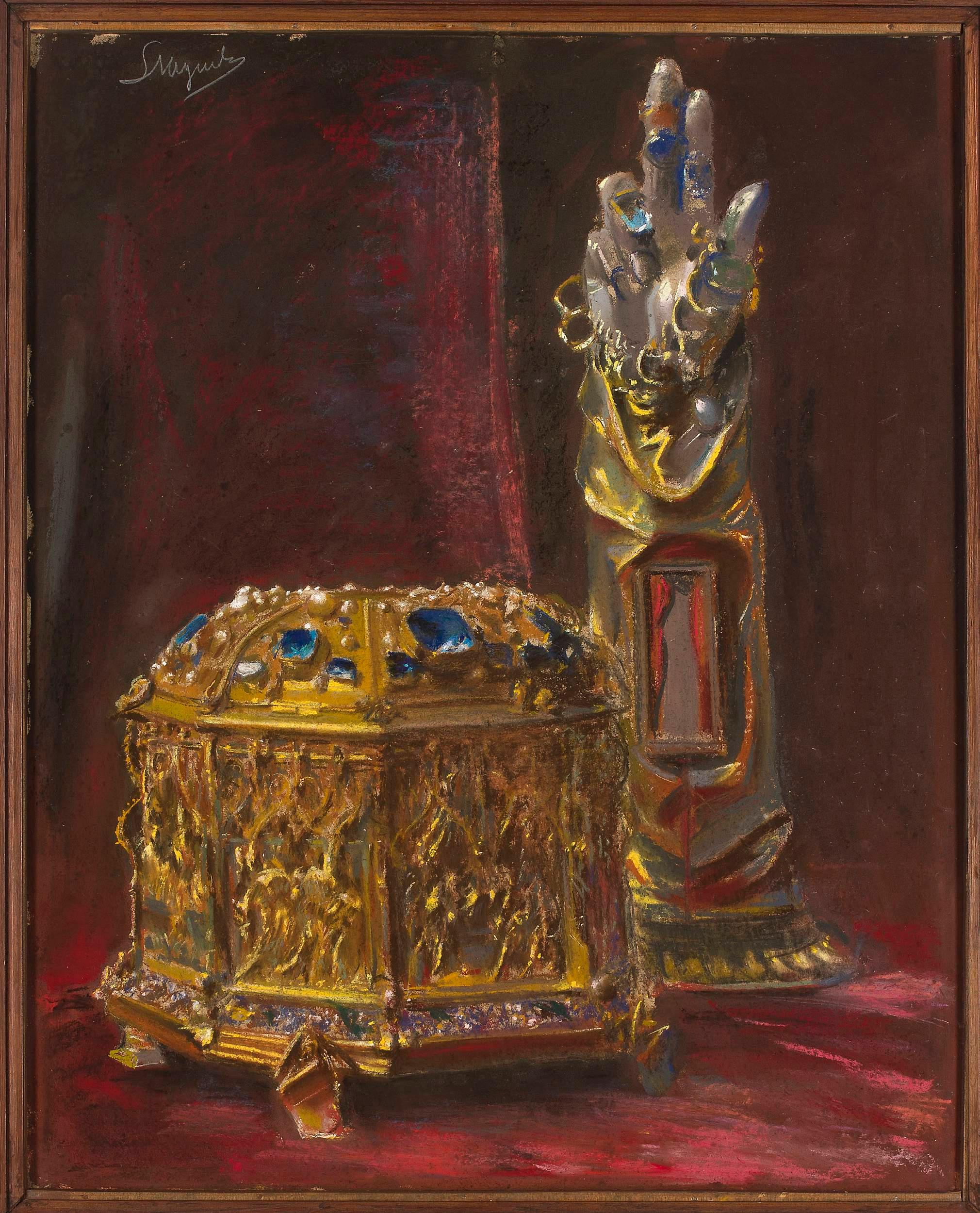
Skarbiec wawelski cycle, Leon Wyczółkowski

==== Polish Painting ====
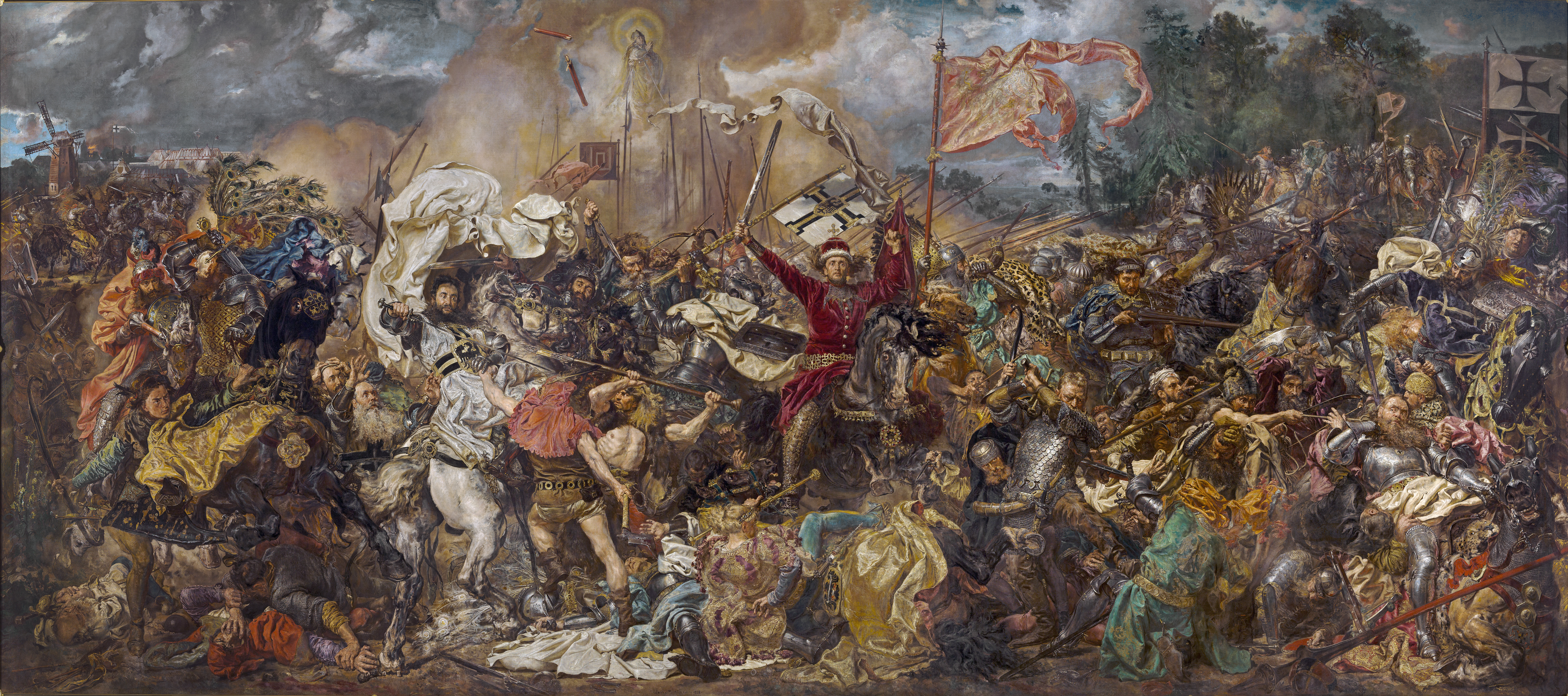
The Battle of Grunwald, Jan Matejko

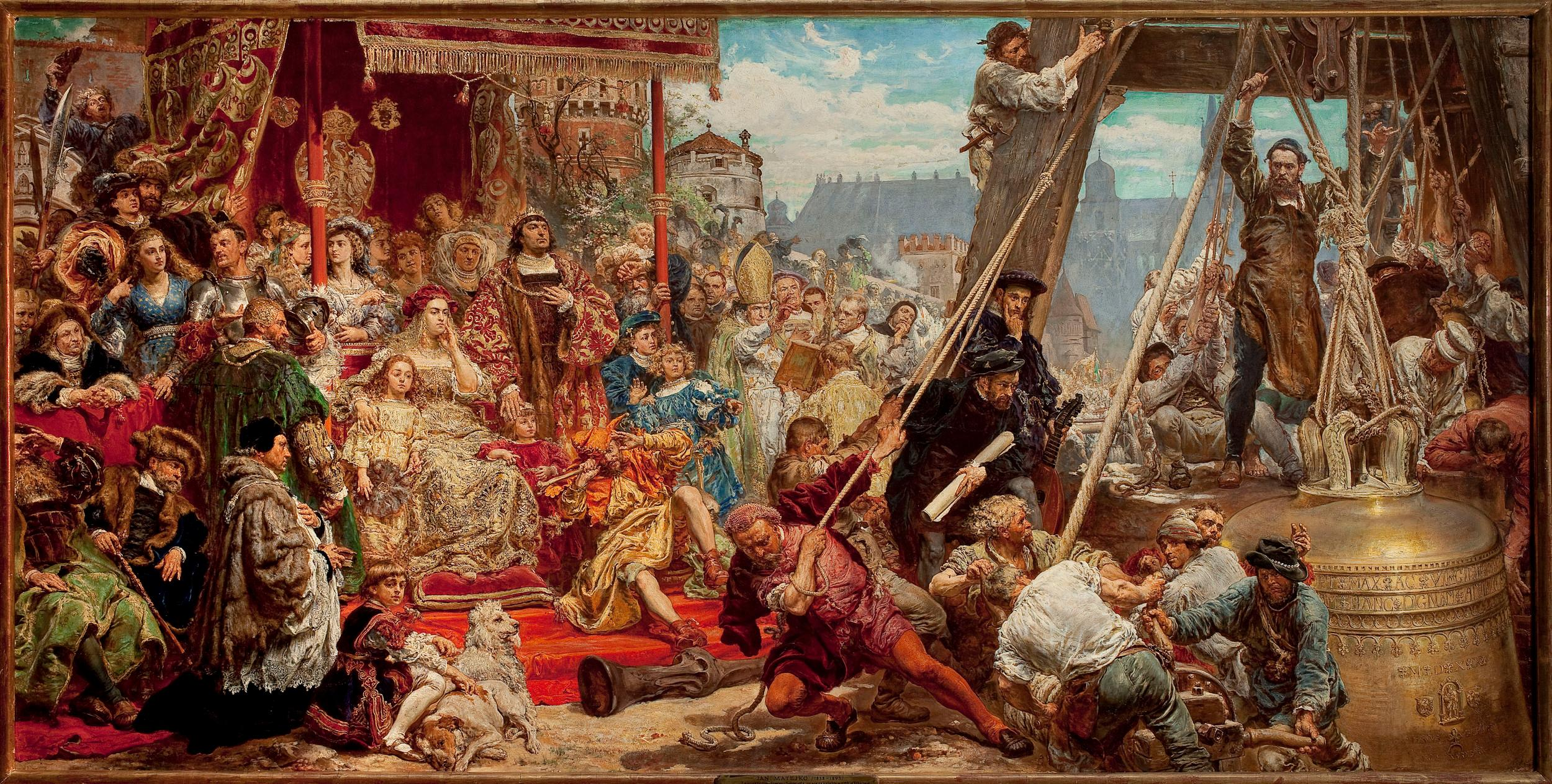
The Hanging of the Sigismund bell, Jan Matejko

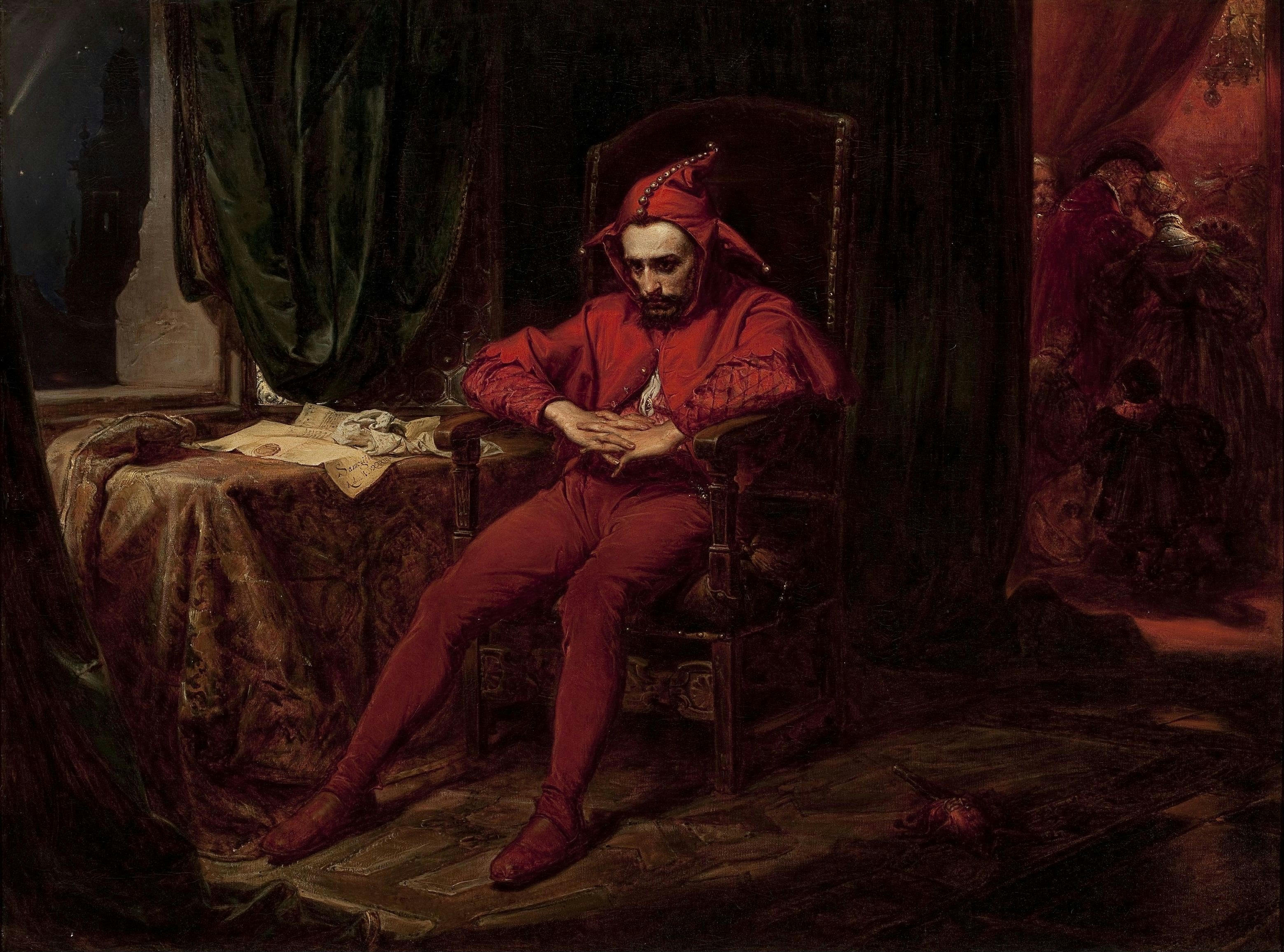
Stańczyk, Jan Matejko

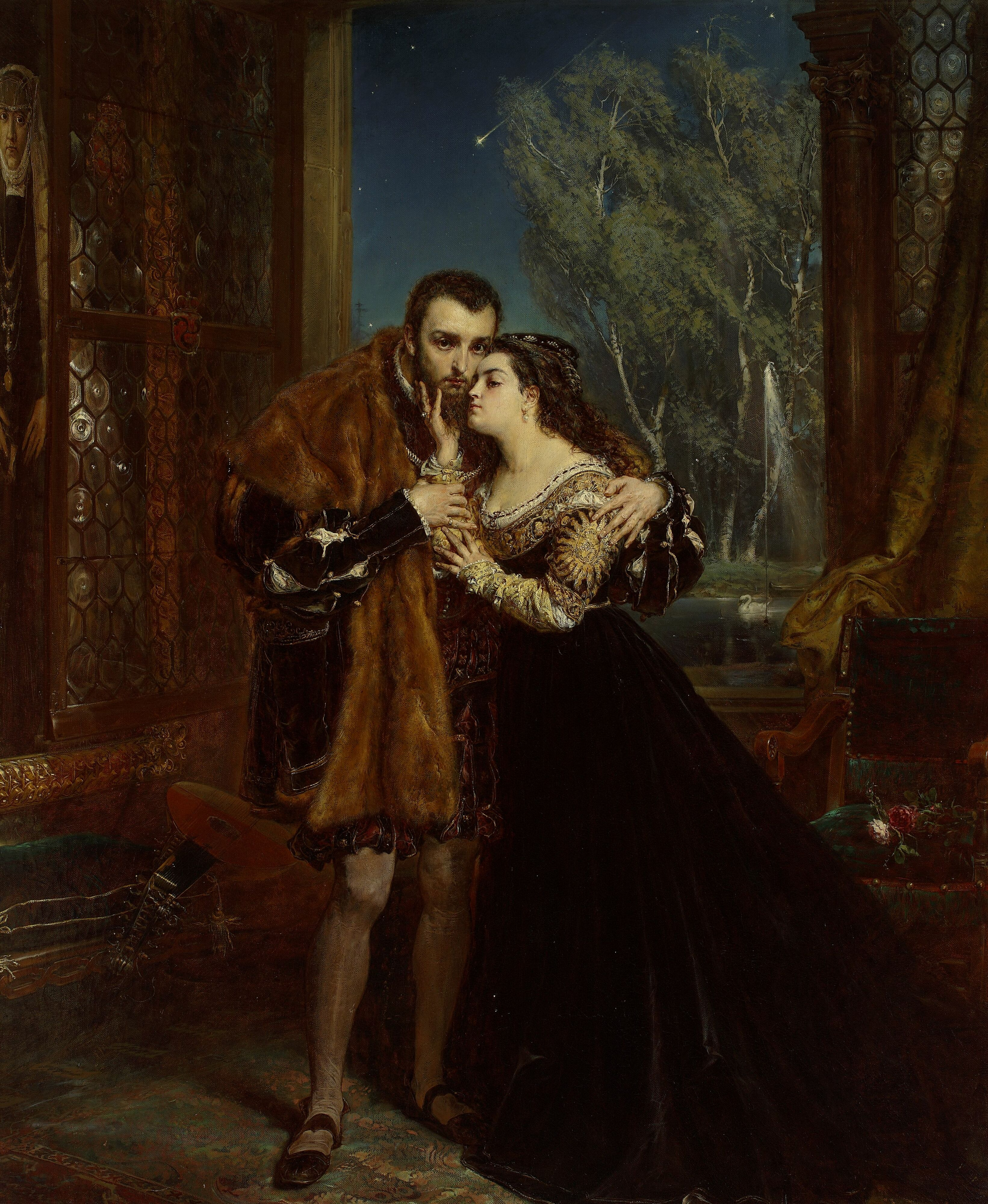
Sigismund Augustus with Barbara at the Radziwiłł court in Vilnius, Jan Matejko

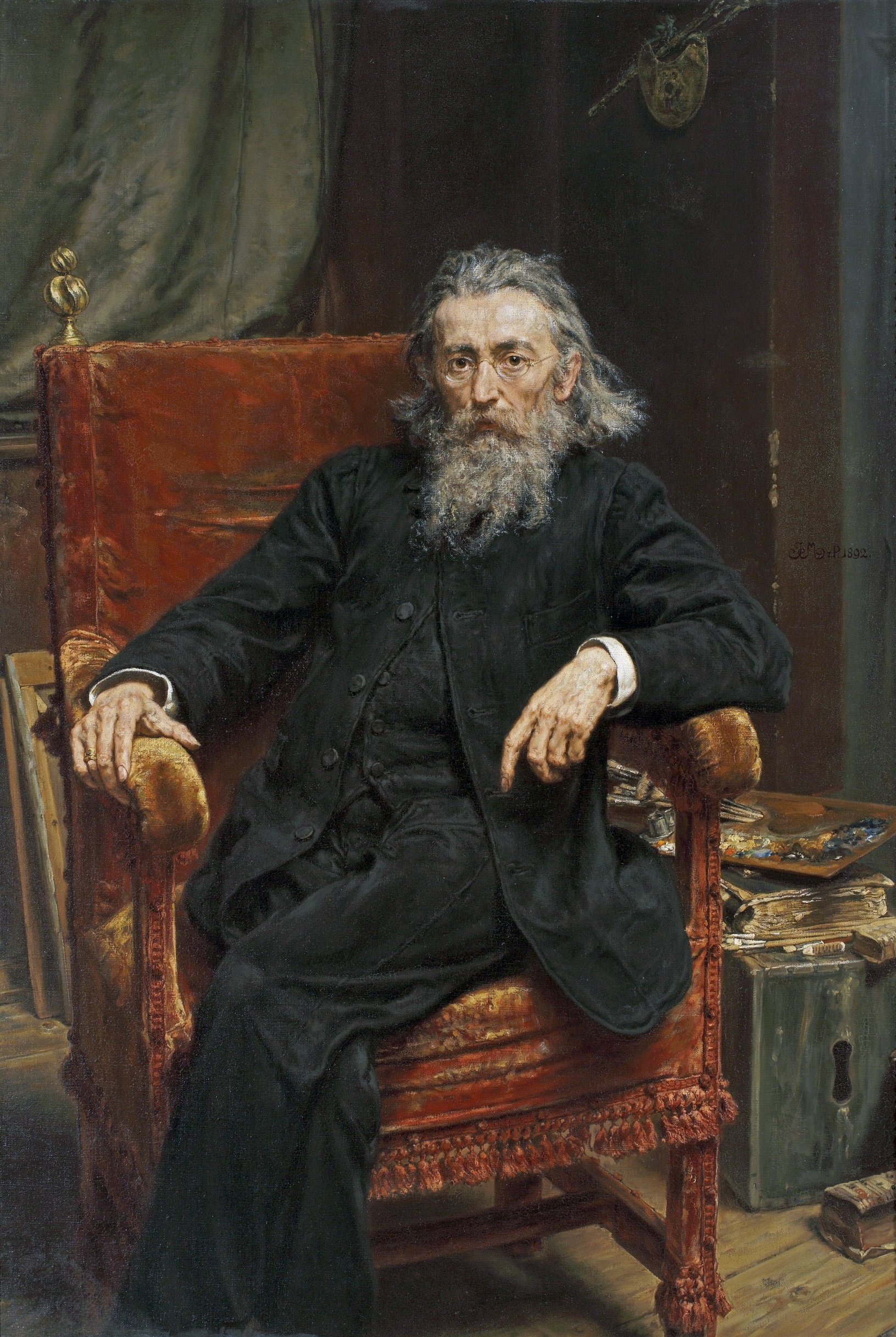
Self-portrait, Jan Matejko

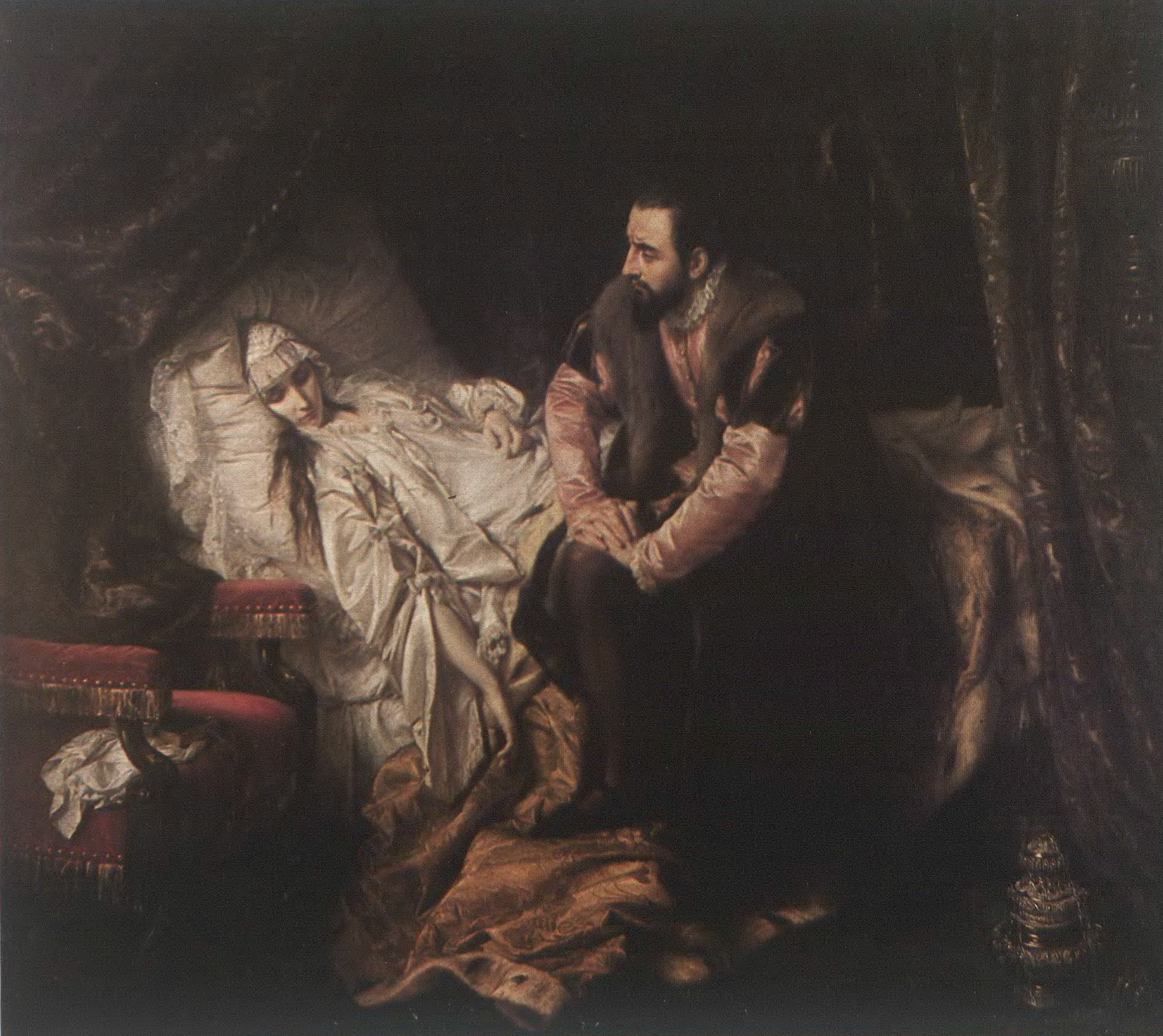
The death of Barbara Radziwiłłówna, Józef Simmler

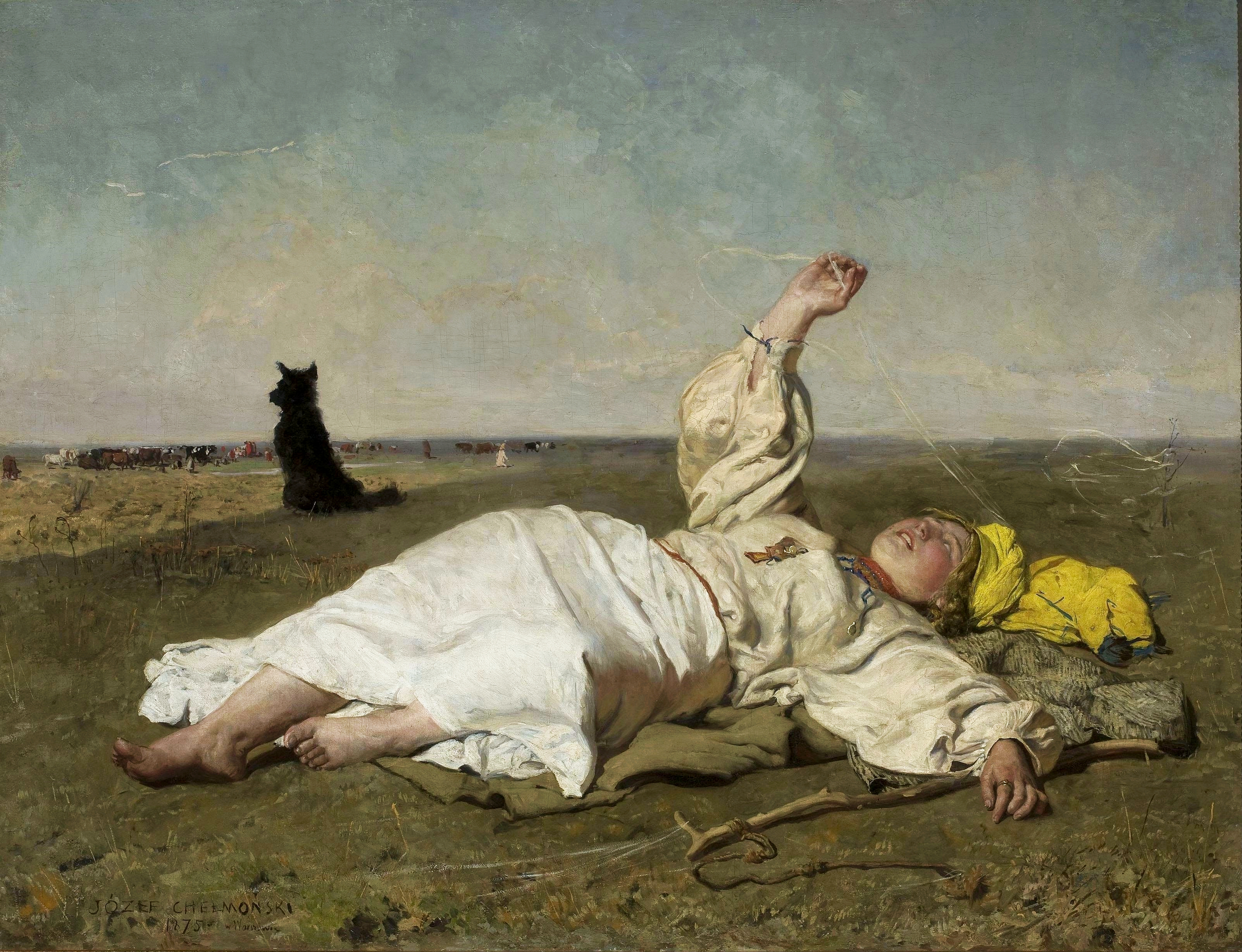
Indian Summer, Józef Chełmoński

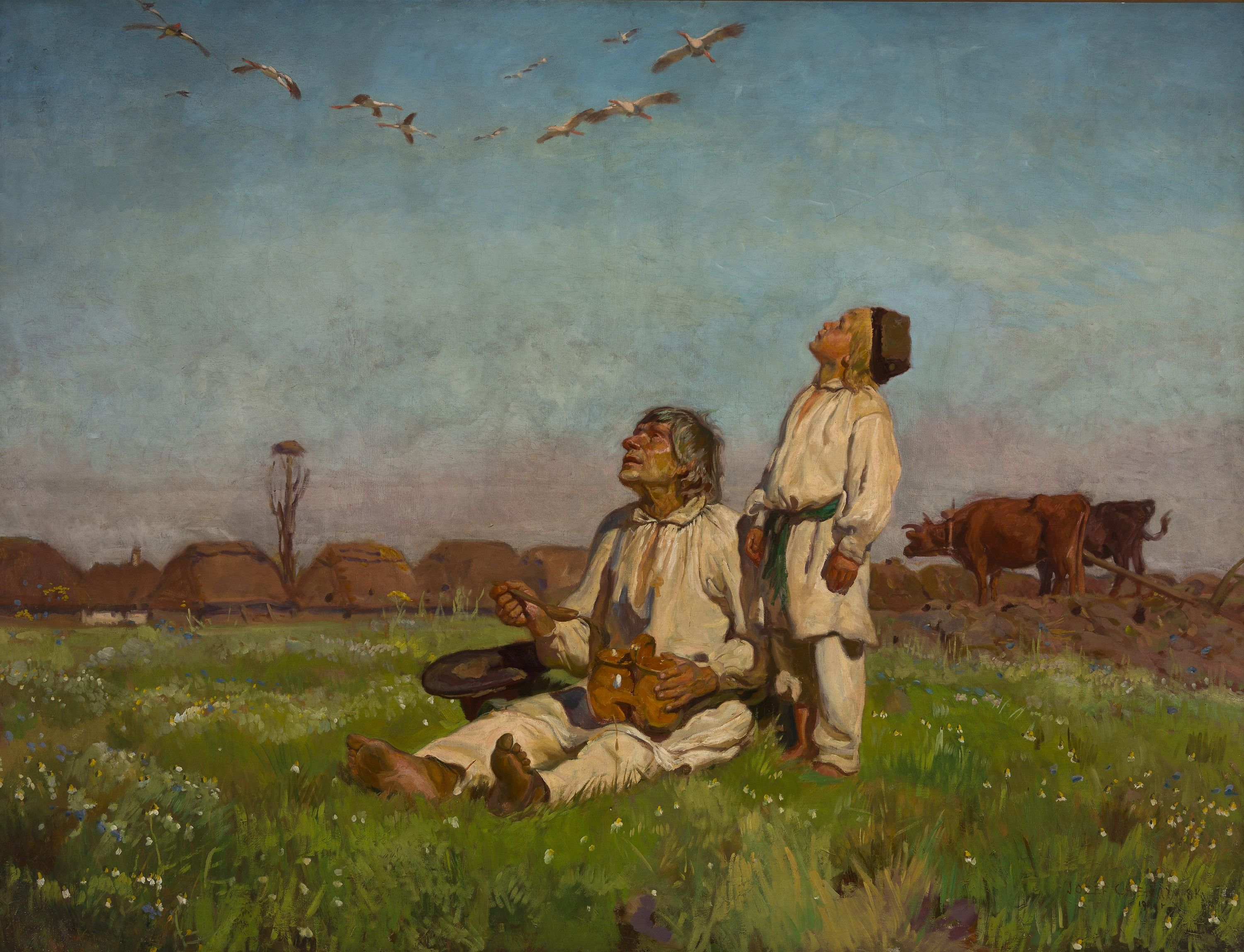
Storks, Józef Chełmoński

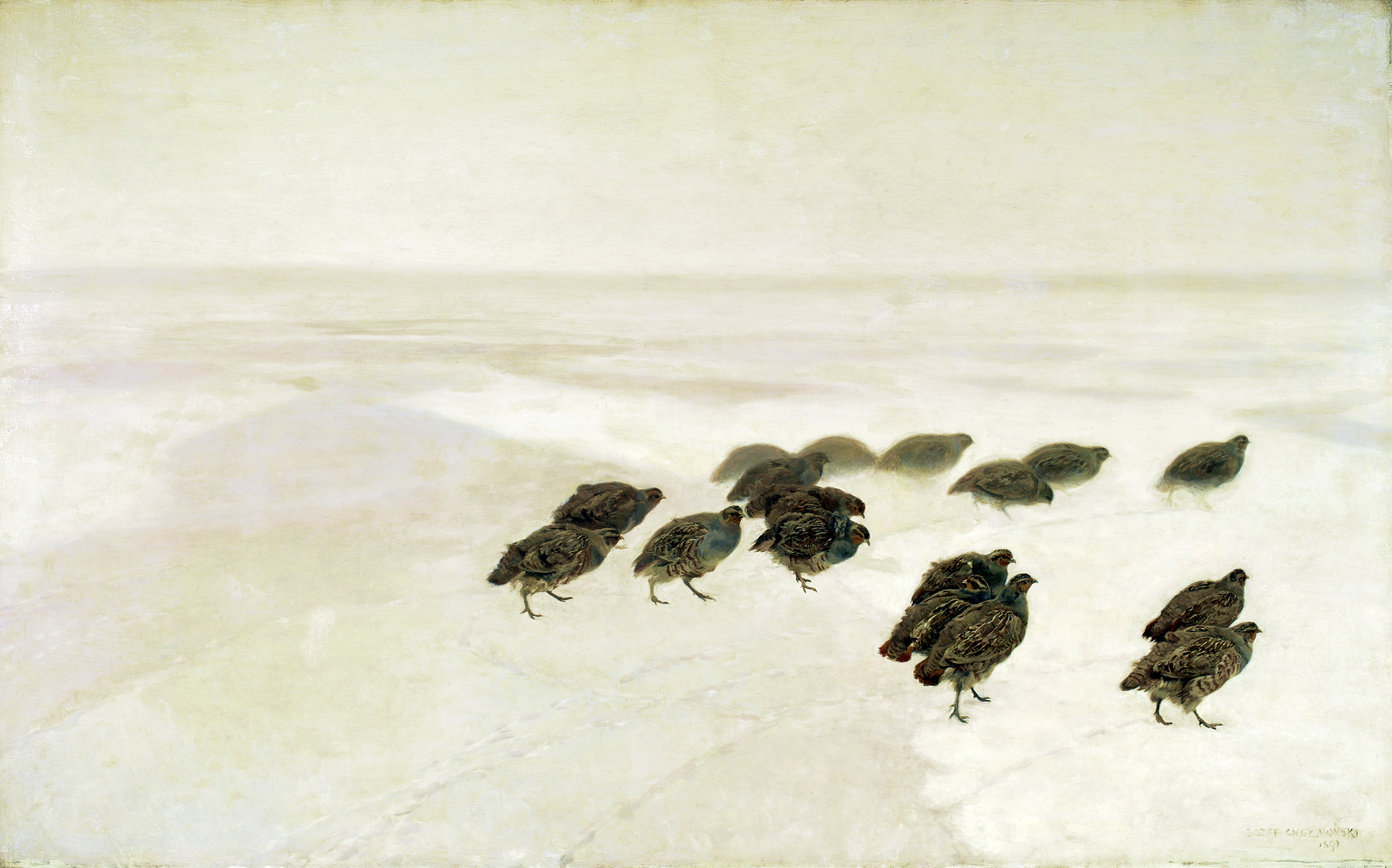
Partridges in the Snow, Józef Chełmoński

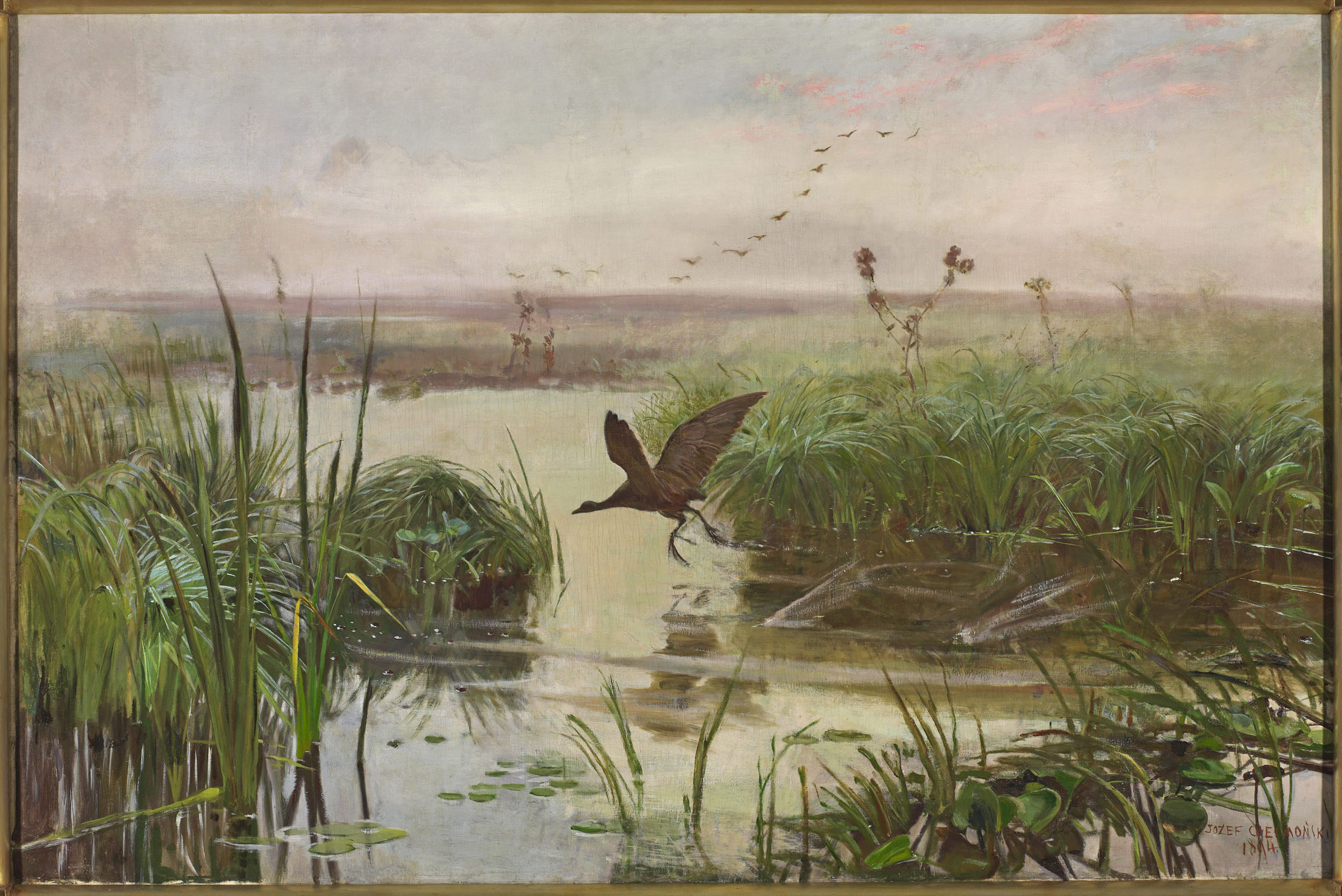
Water Hen, Józef Chełmoński

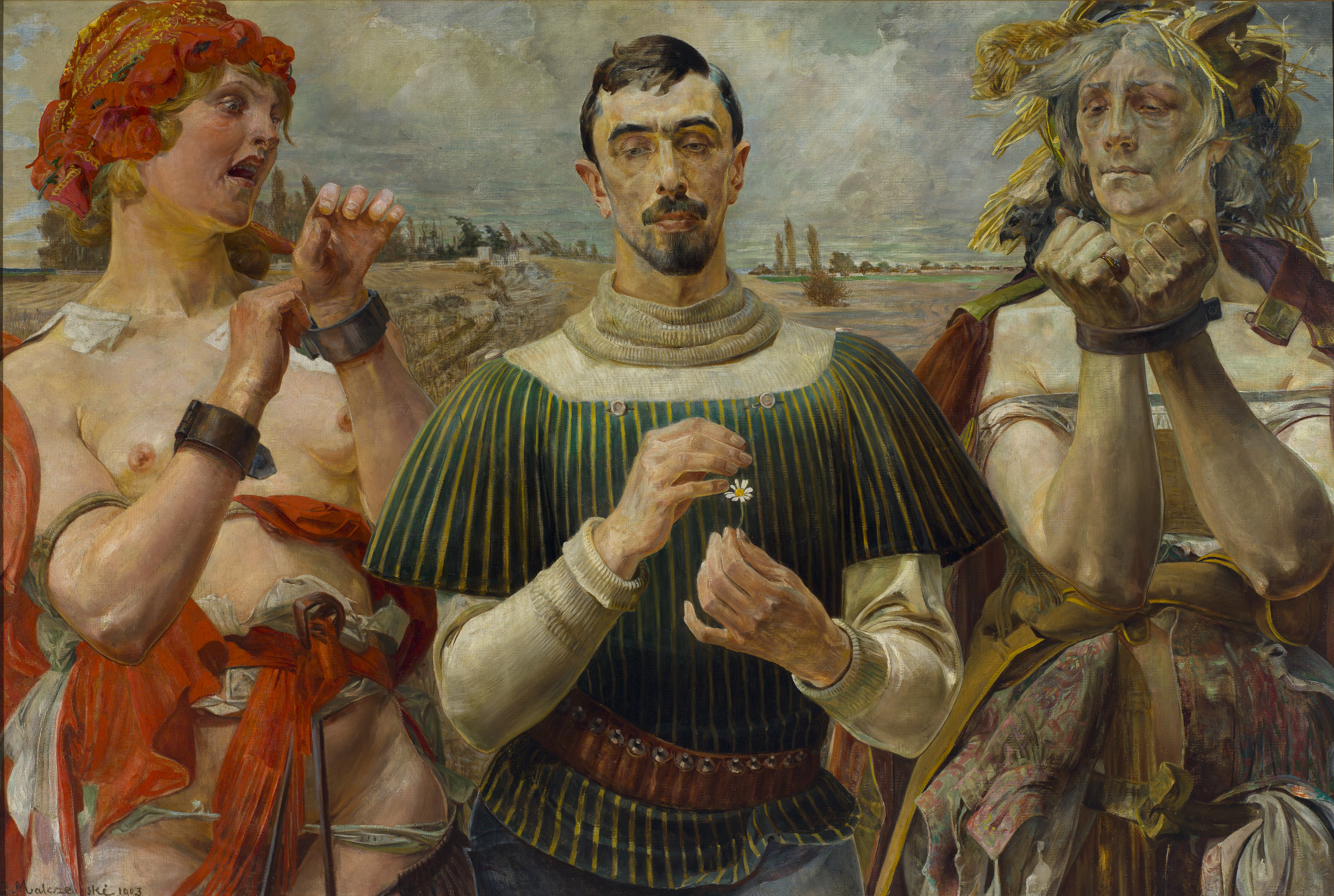
Polish Hamlet, Jacek Malczewski

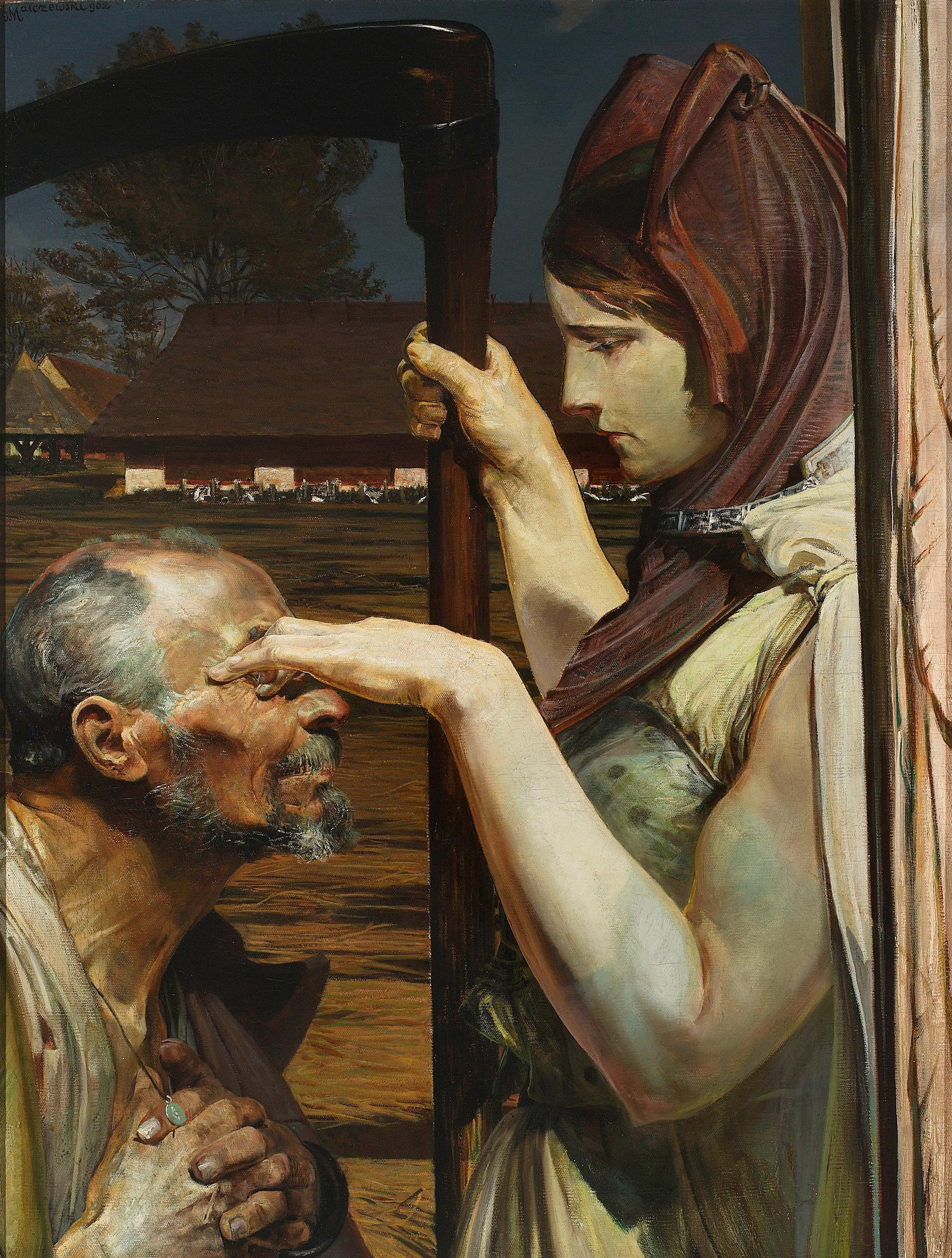
Death, Jacek Malczewski

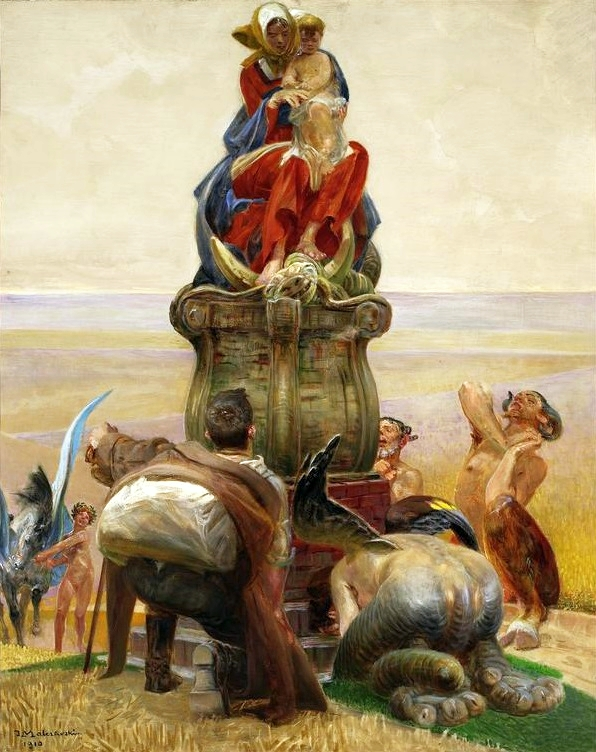
Adoration of Madonna, central section of the triptych “Go to the streams”, Jacek Malczewski

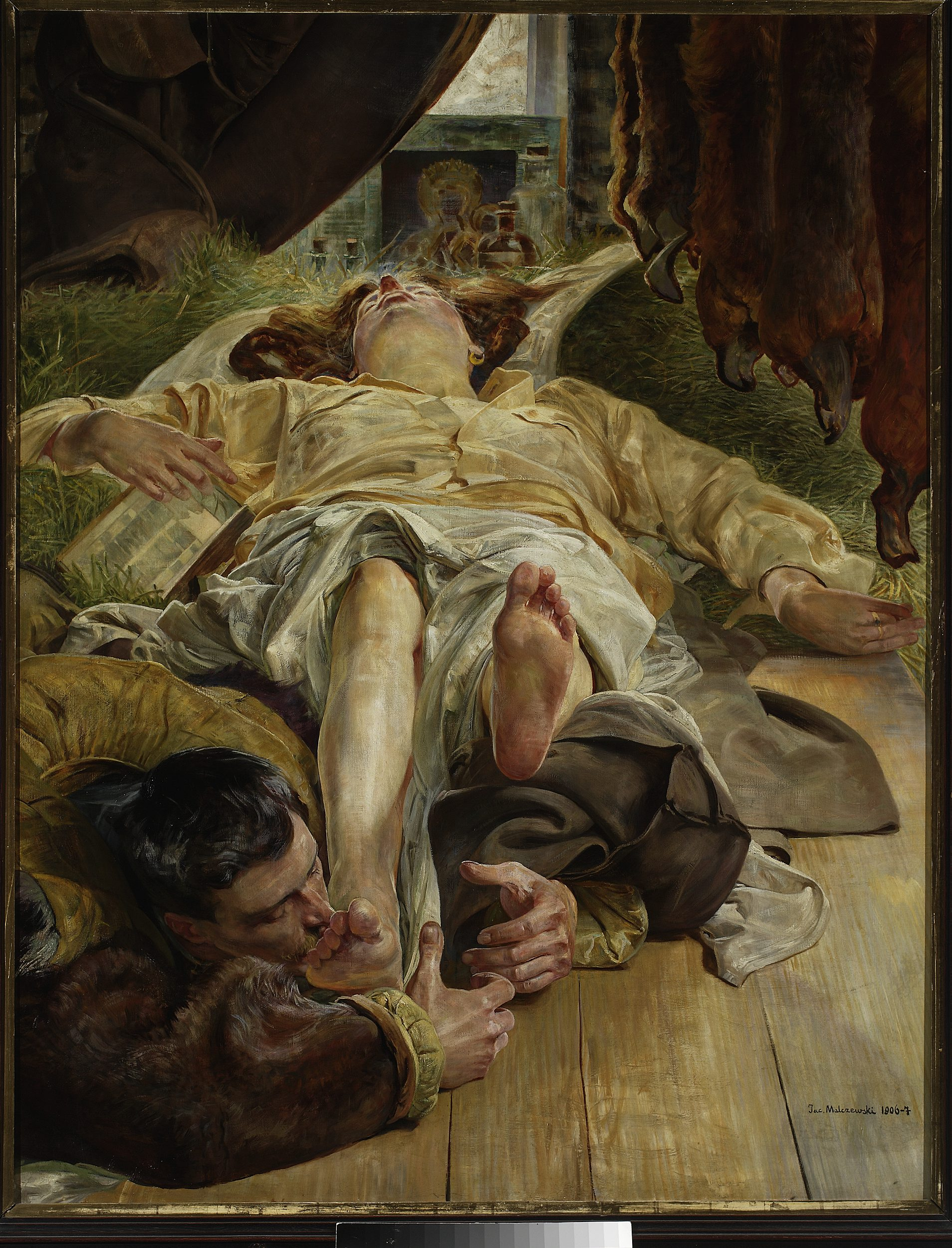
Death of Ellenai, Jacek Malczewski

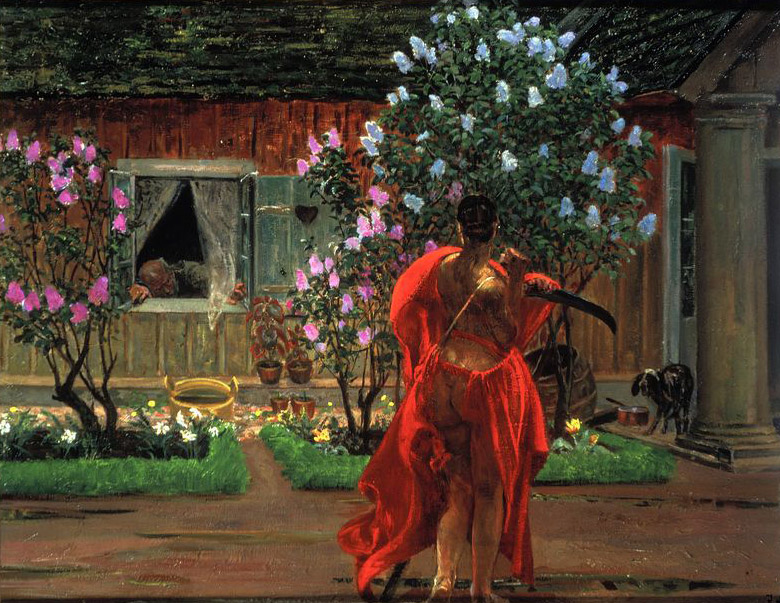
Thanatos, Jacek Malczewski

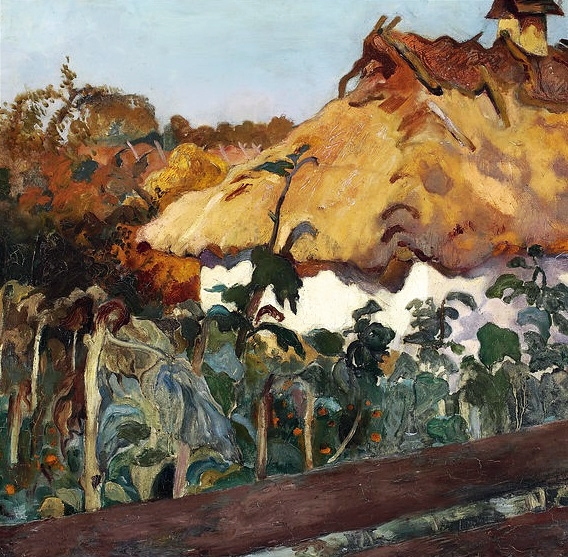
A Cottage, Kazimierz Sichulski

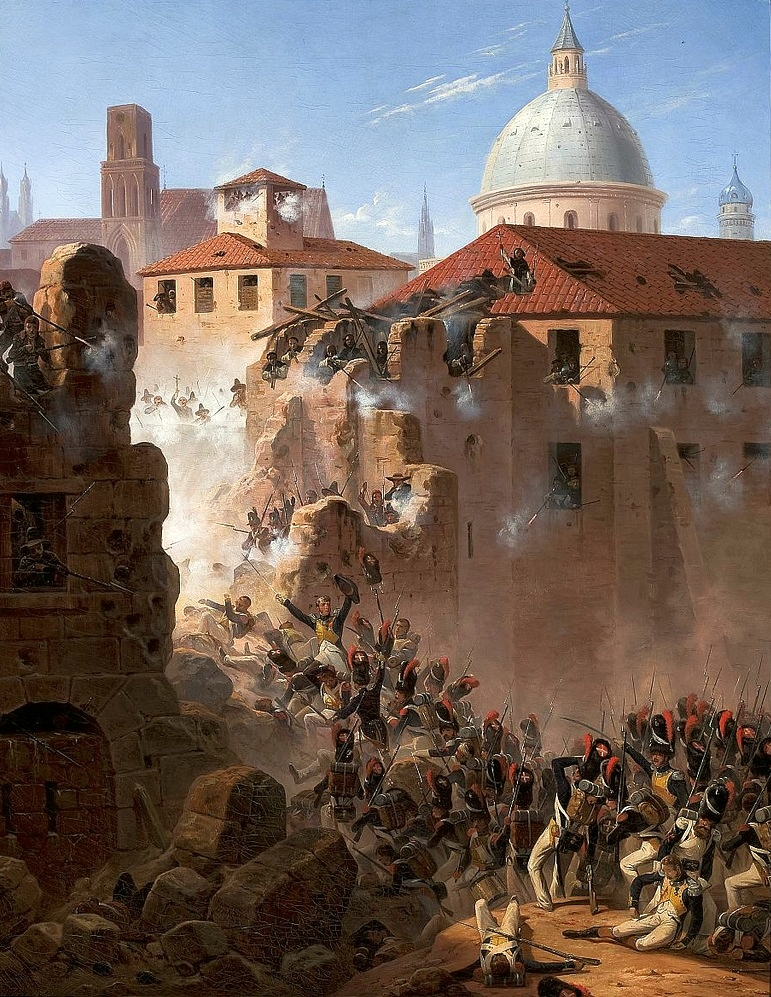
Assault on Saragossa, January Suchodolski

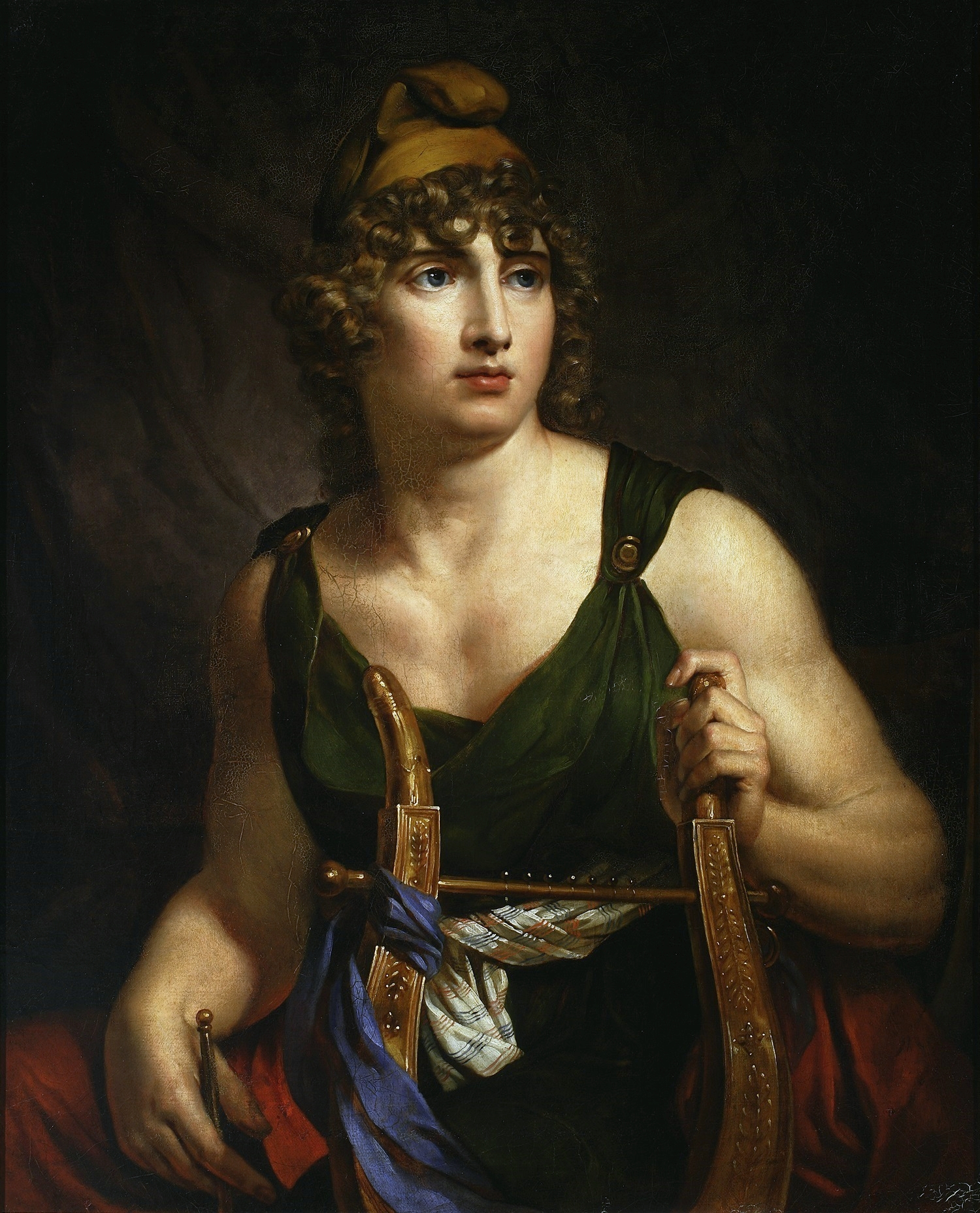
Paris in the Phrygian Cap, Antoni Brodowski

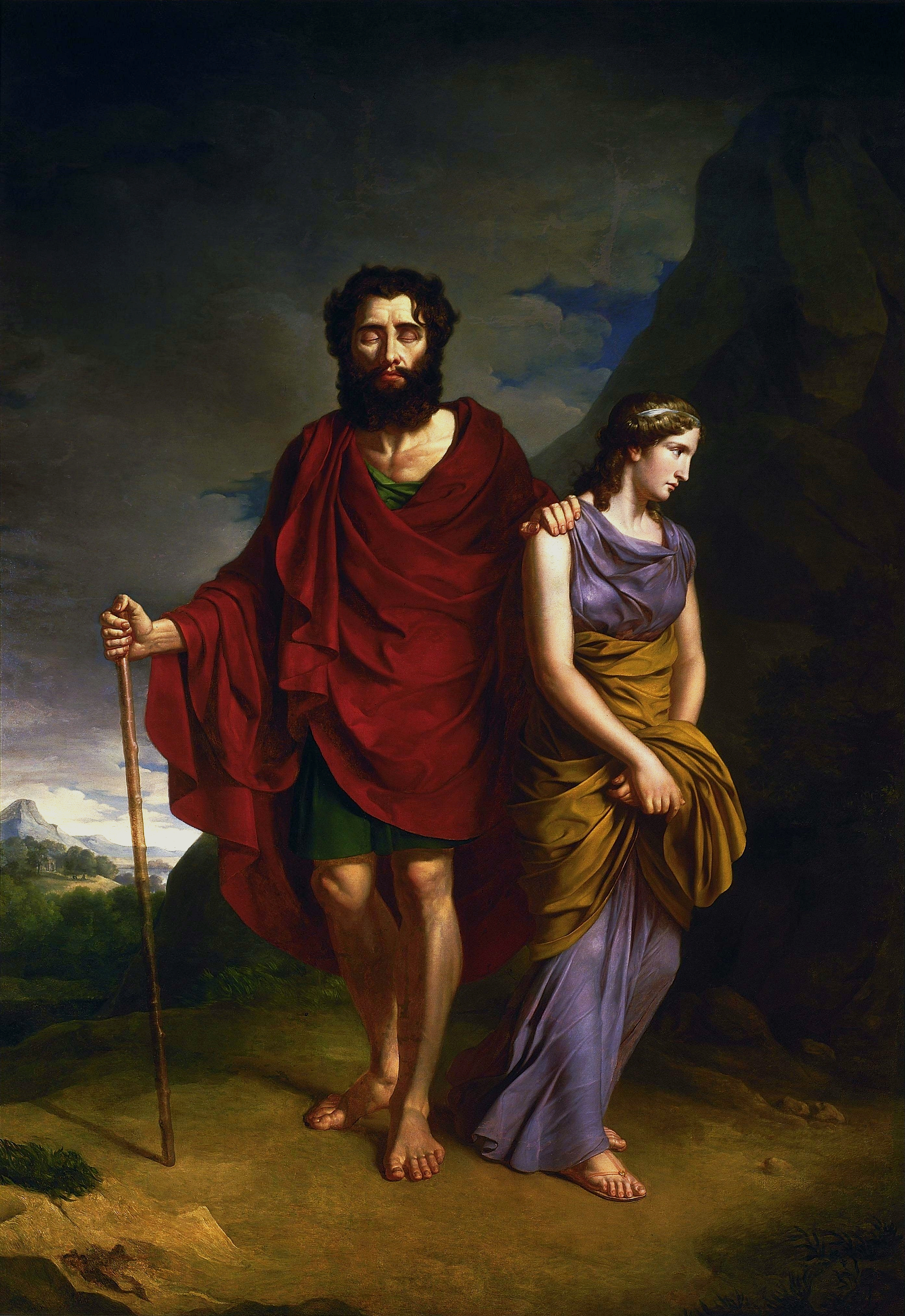
Oedipus and Antigone, Antoni Brodowski

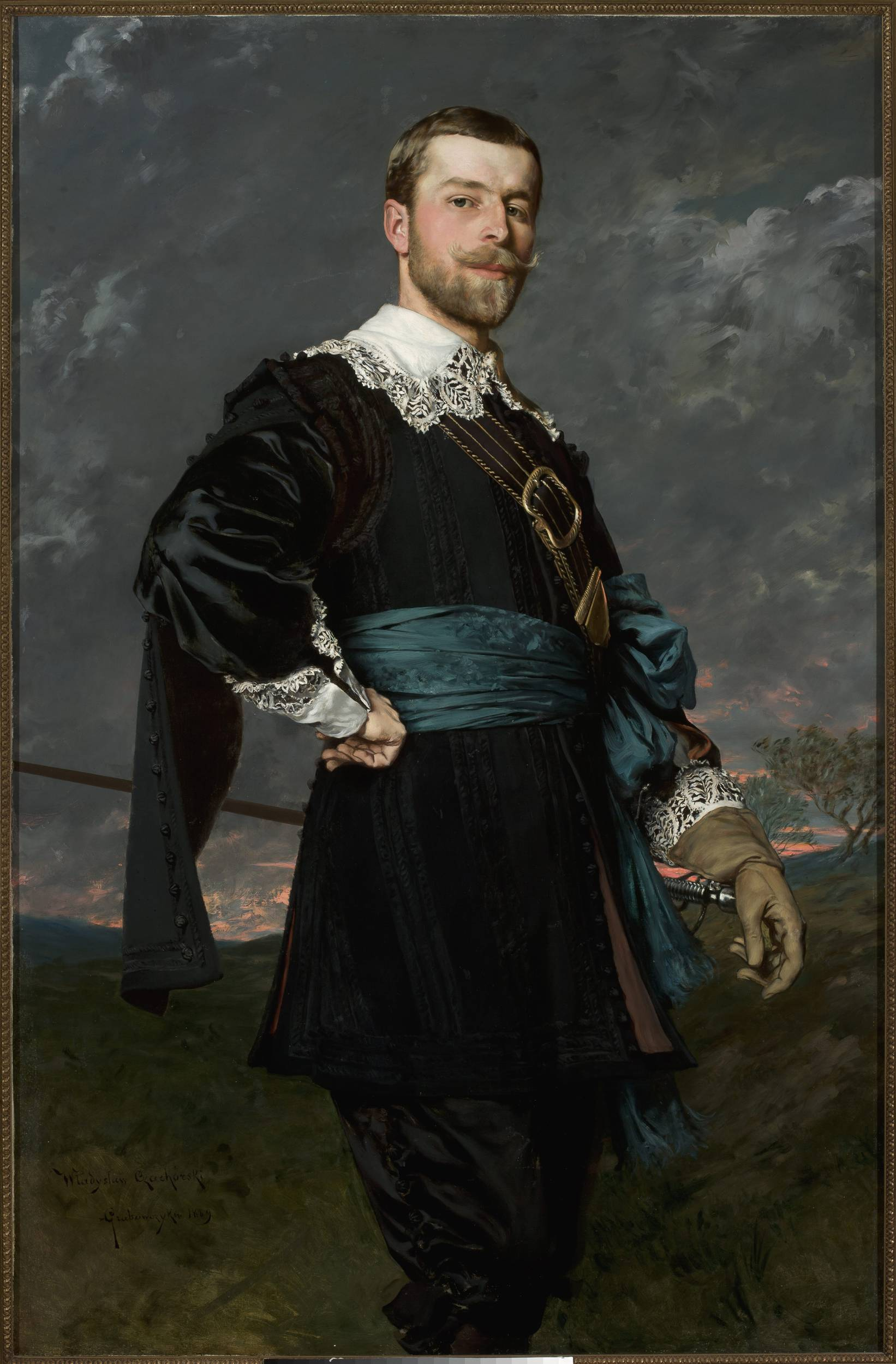
Portrait of Stanisław Czachórski, artist’s brother, Władysław Czachórski

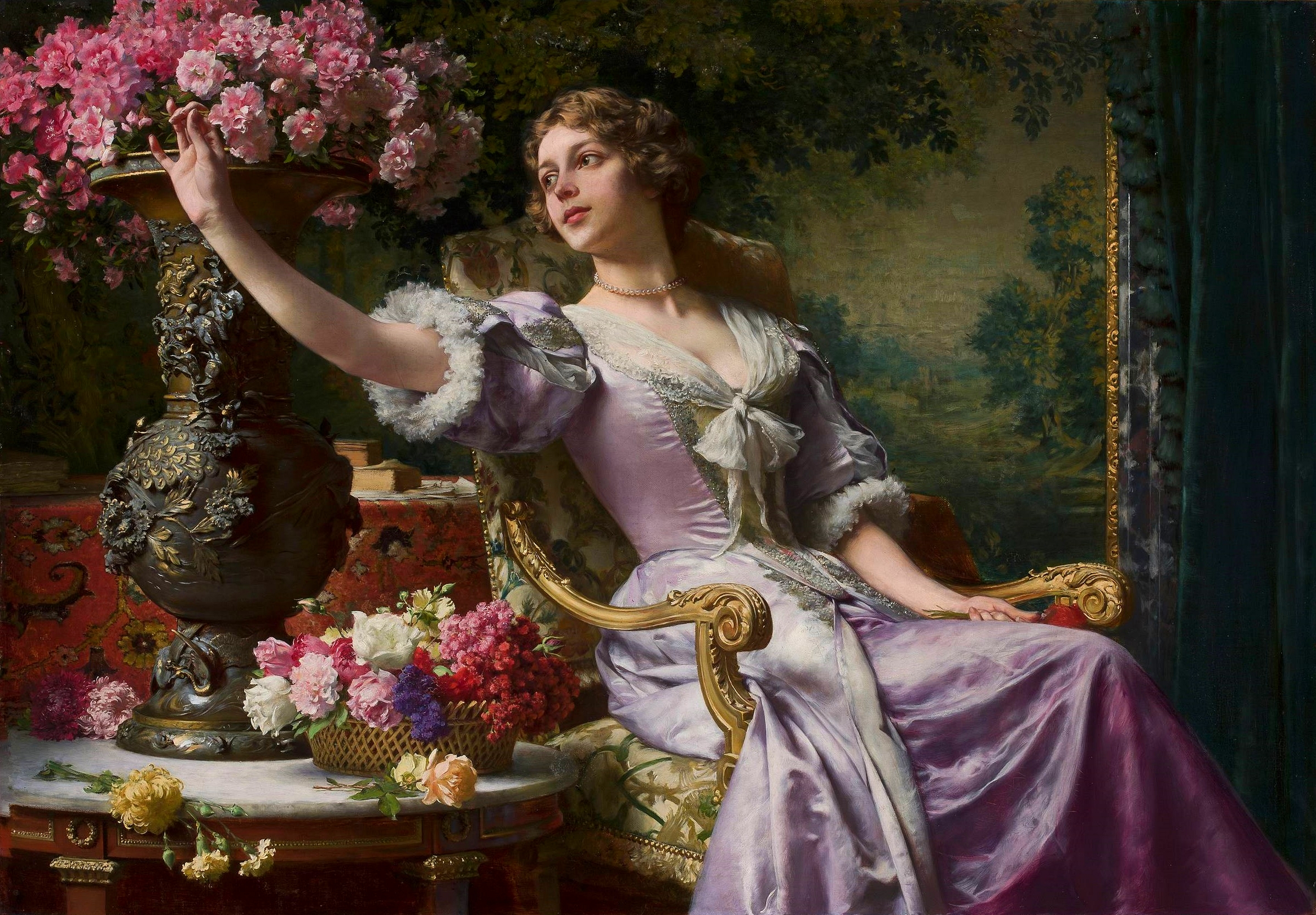
Lady in a lilac dress, Władysław Czachórski

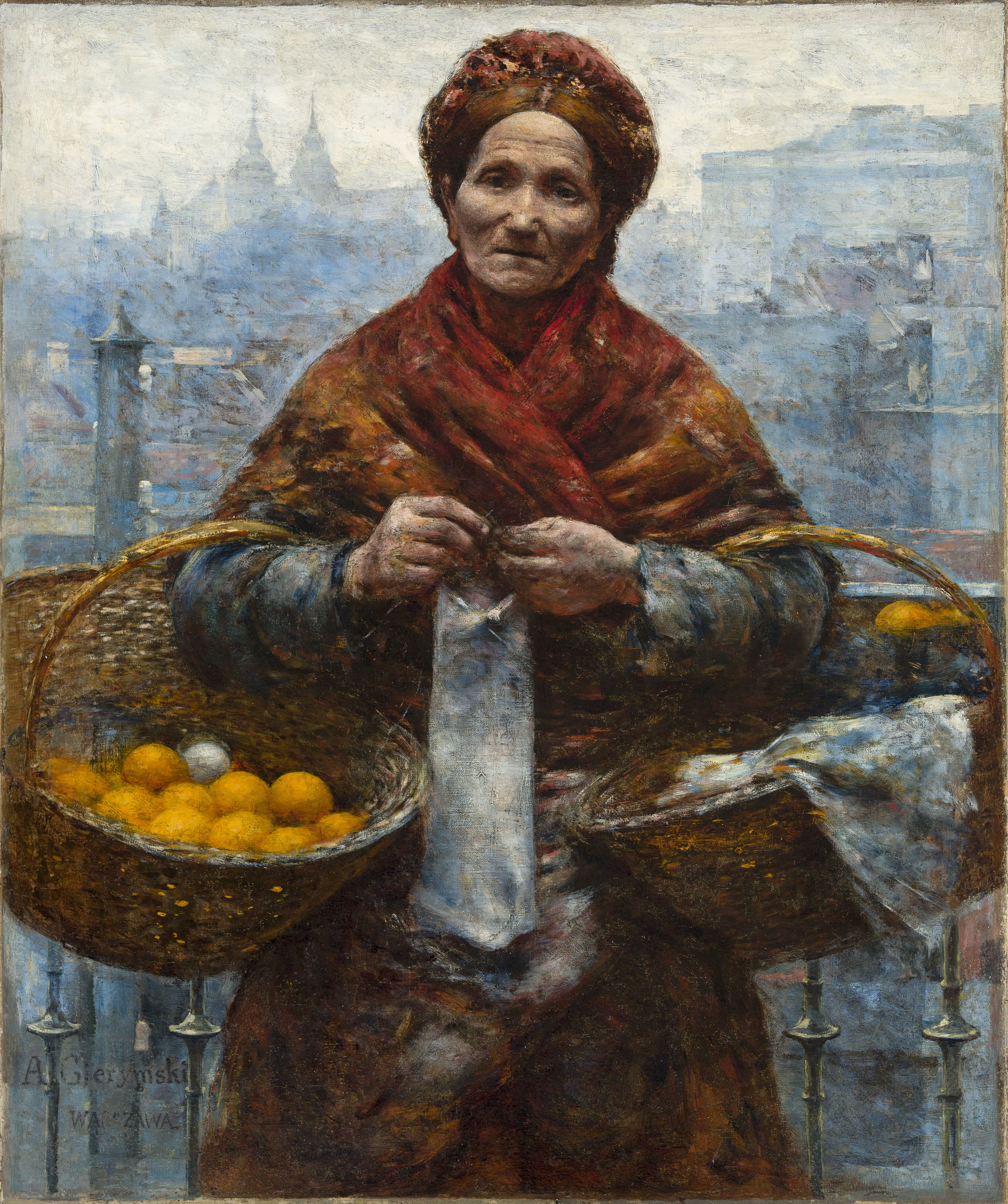
Jewish Woman Selling Oranges, Aleksander Gierymski

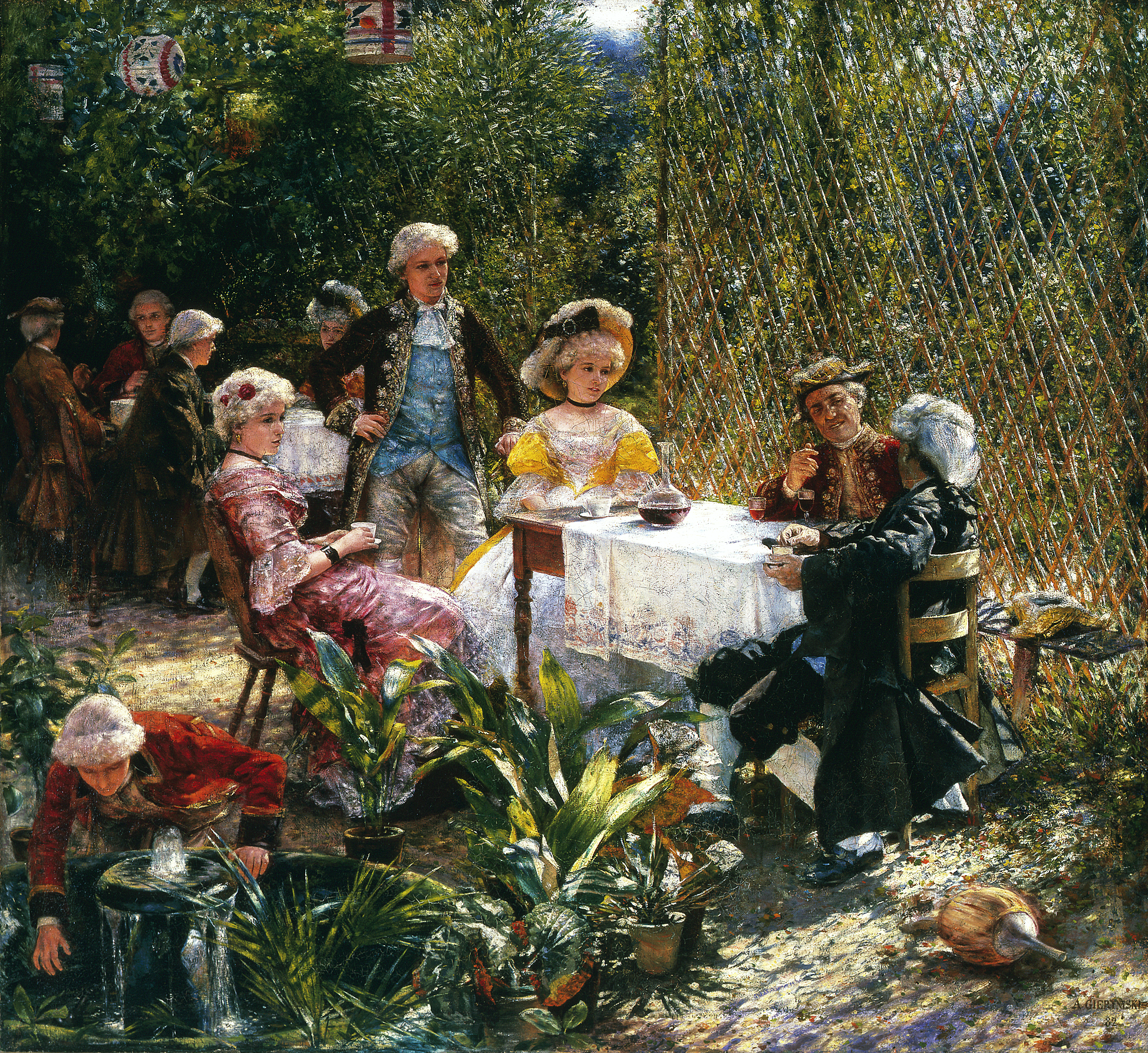
In the Arbour, Aleksander Gierymski

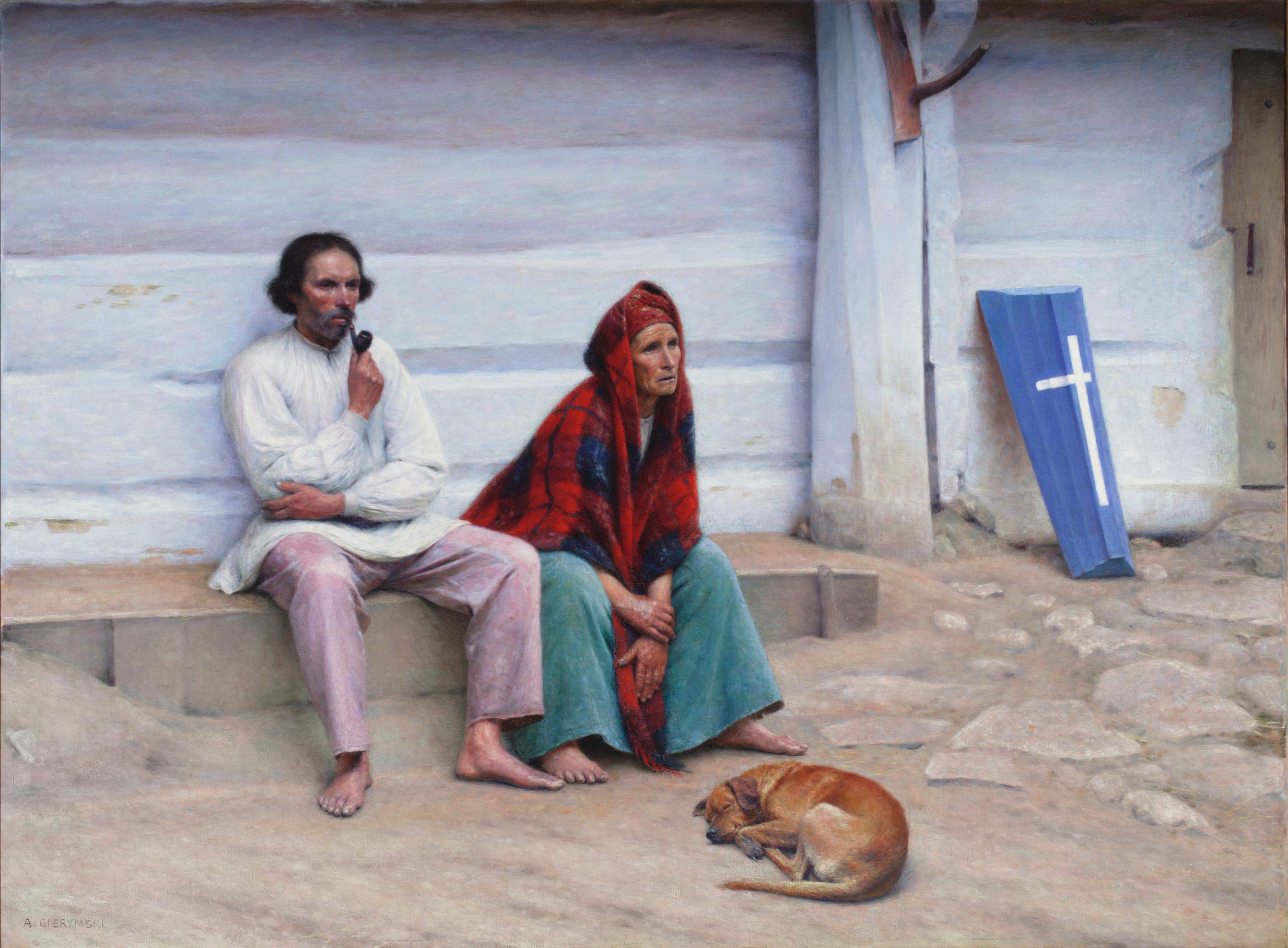
Peasant Coffin, Aleksander Gierymski

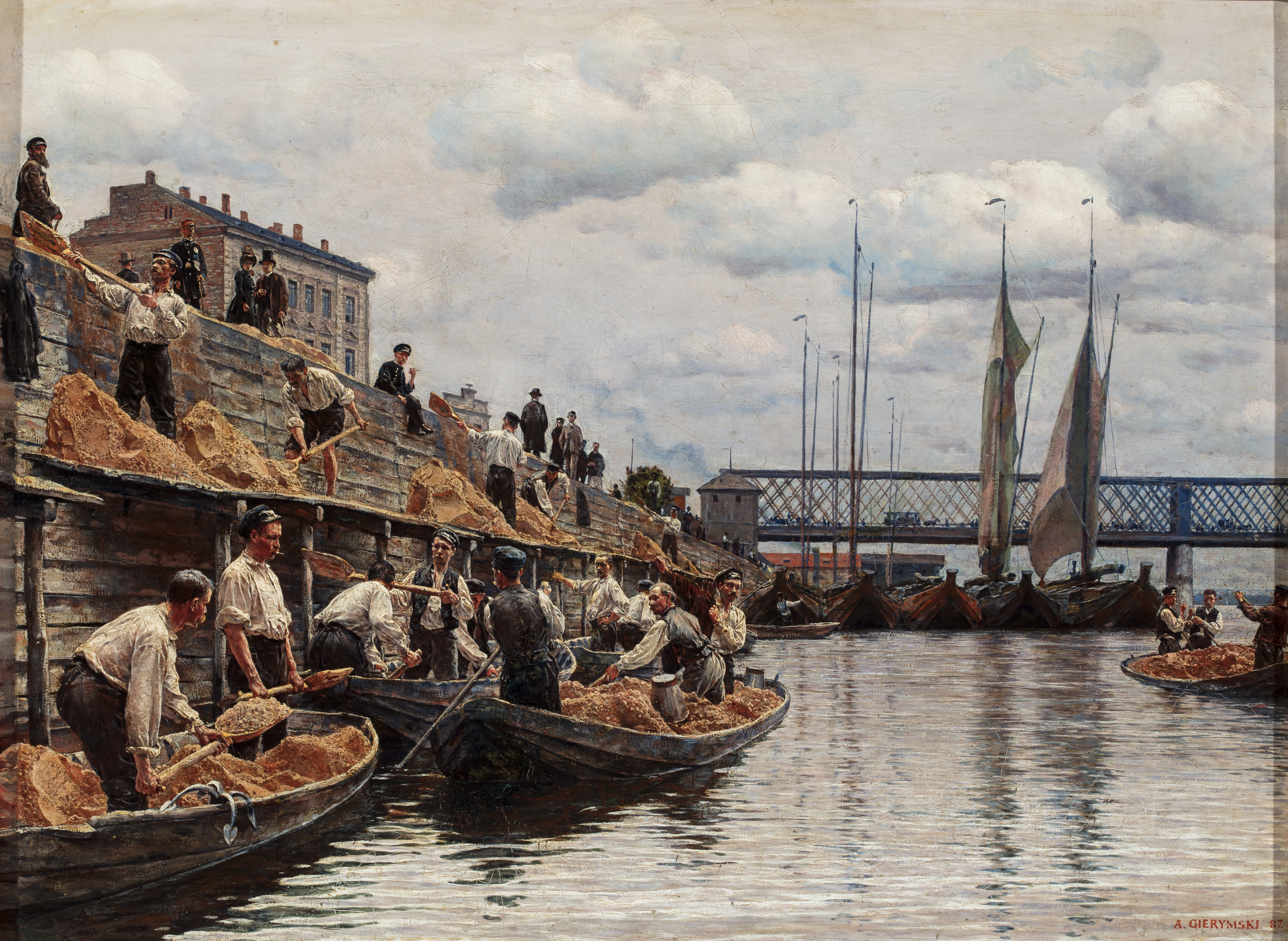
Sandblasters, Aleksander Gierymski

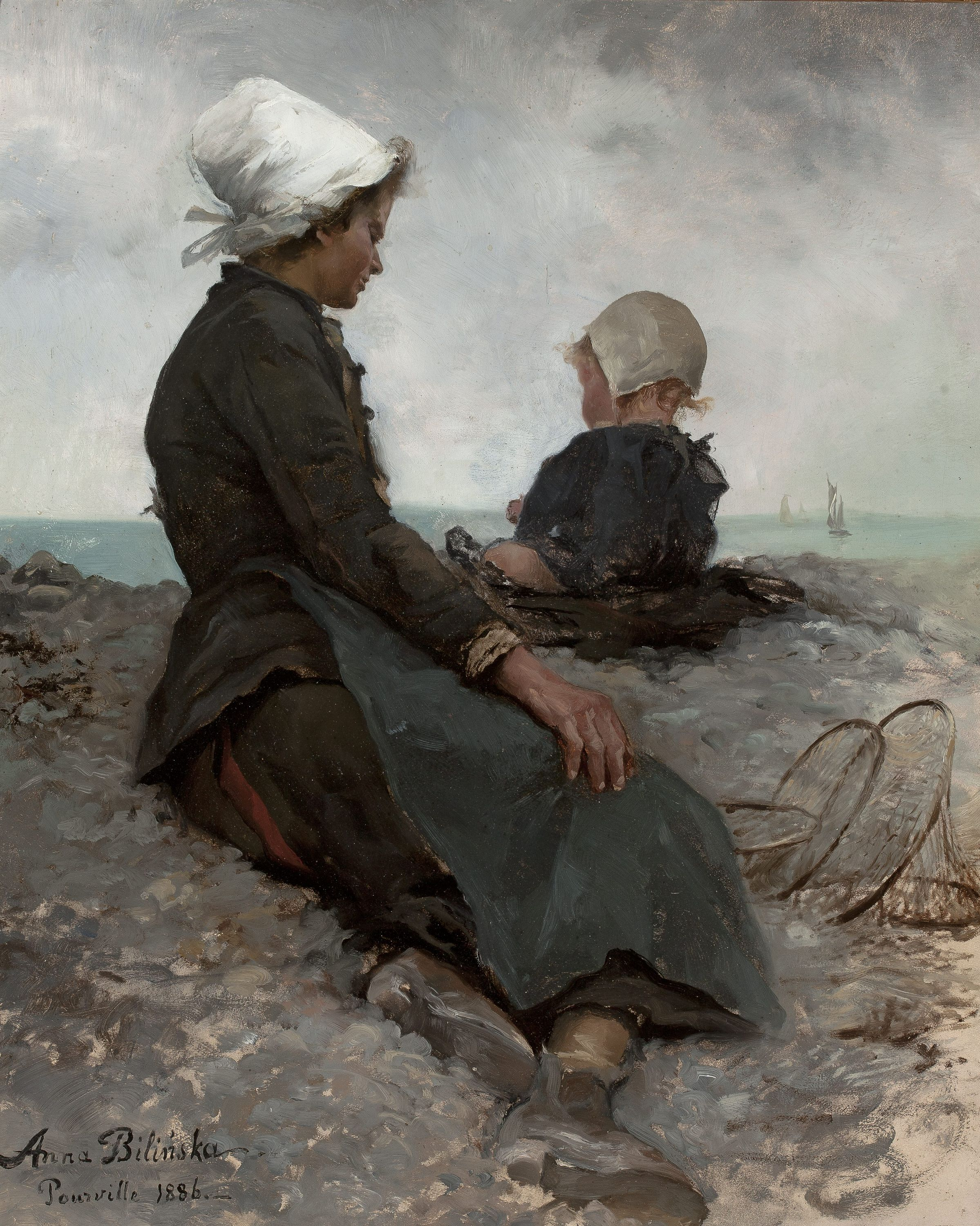
At the Seashore, Anna Bilińska

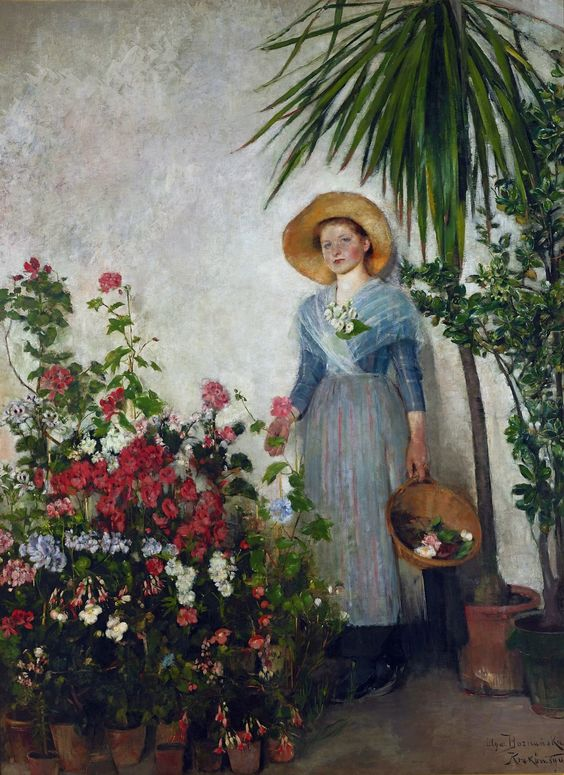
In the Orangery, Olga Boznańska

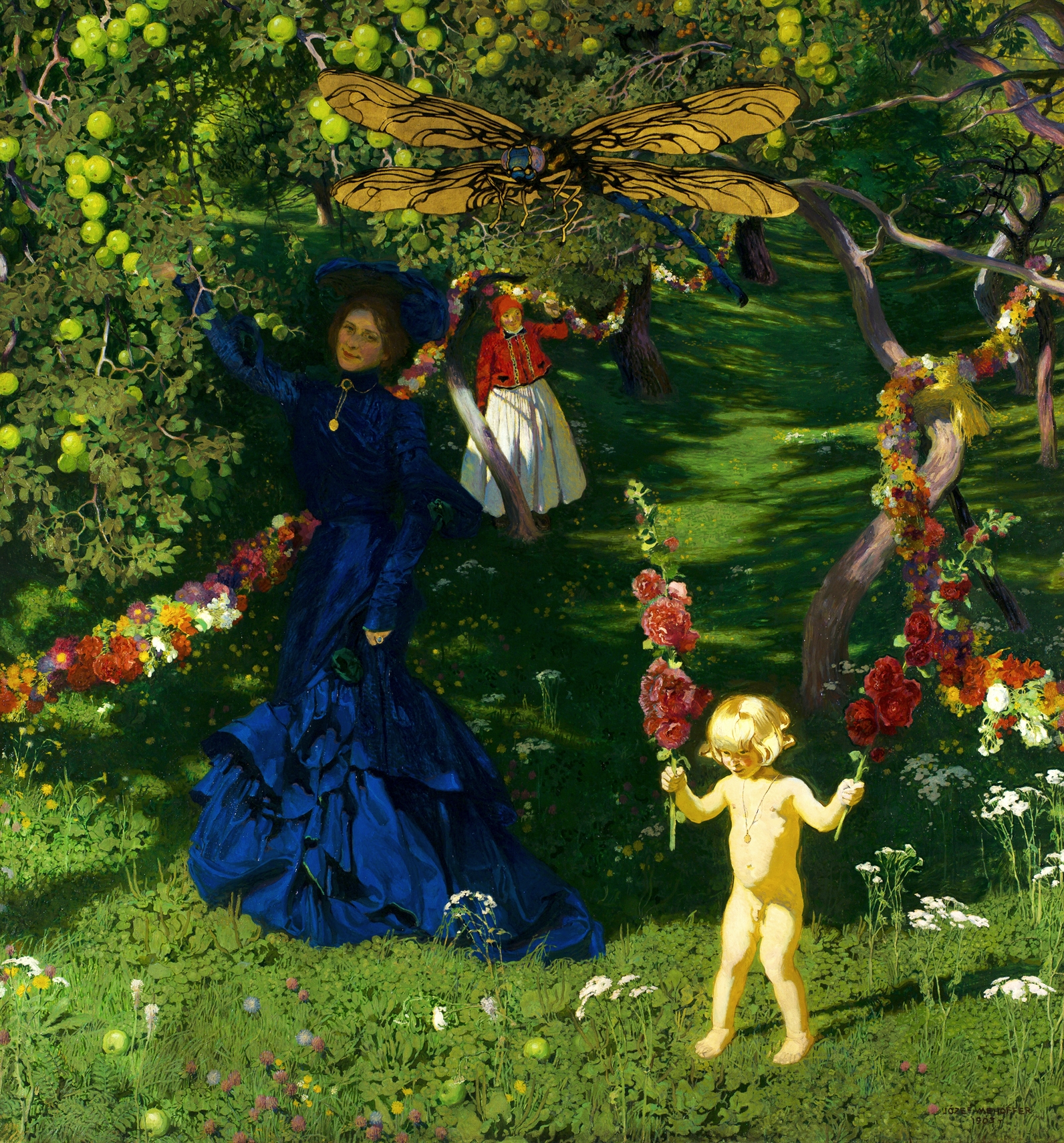
Strange Garden, Józef Mehofer

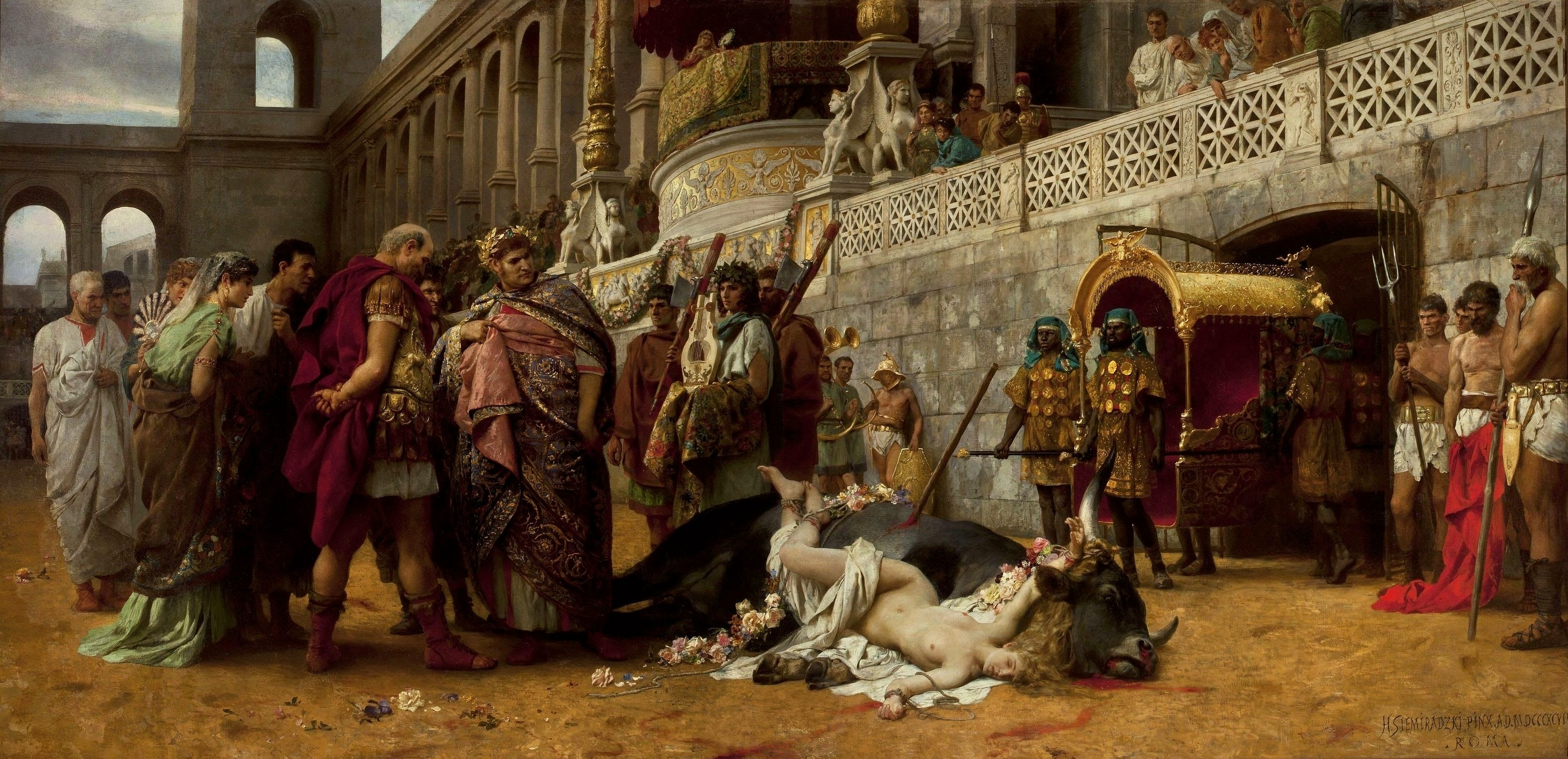
Christian Dirce, Henryk Siemiradzki

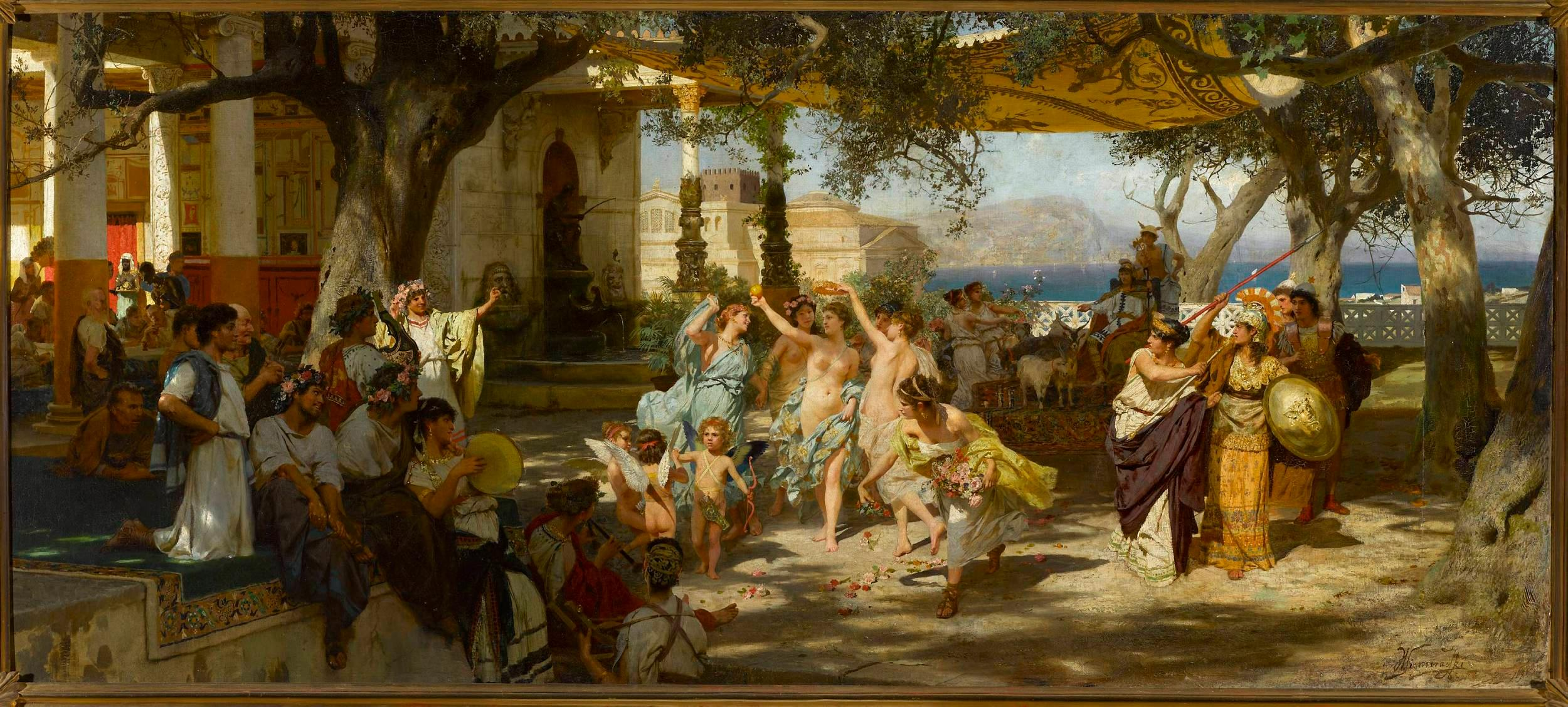
Judgement of Paris, Henryk Siemiradzki

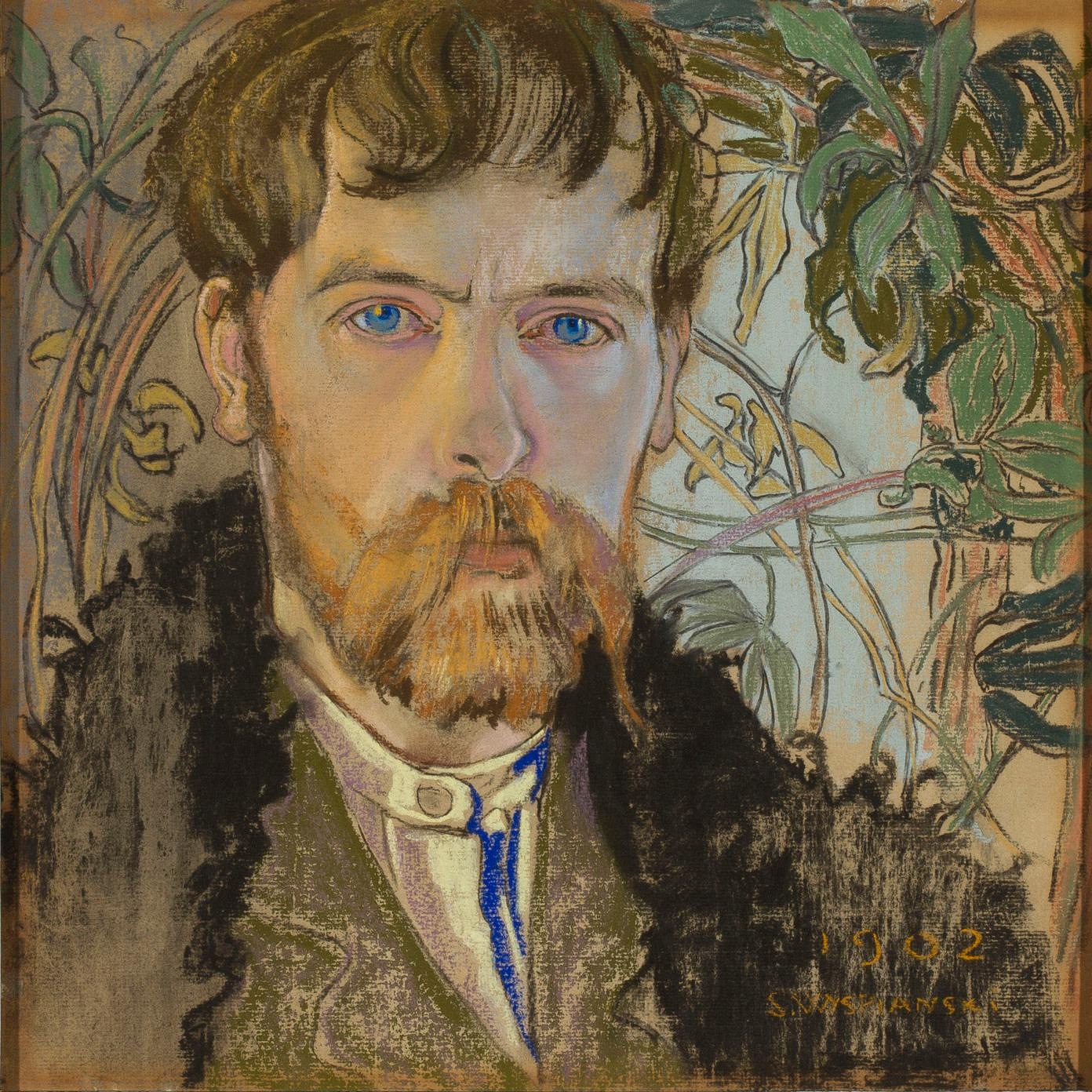
Self-portrait, Stanisław Wyspiański

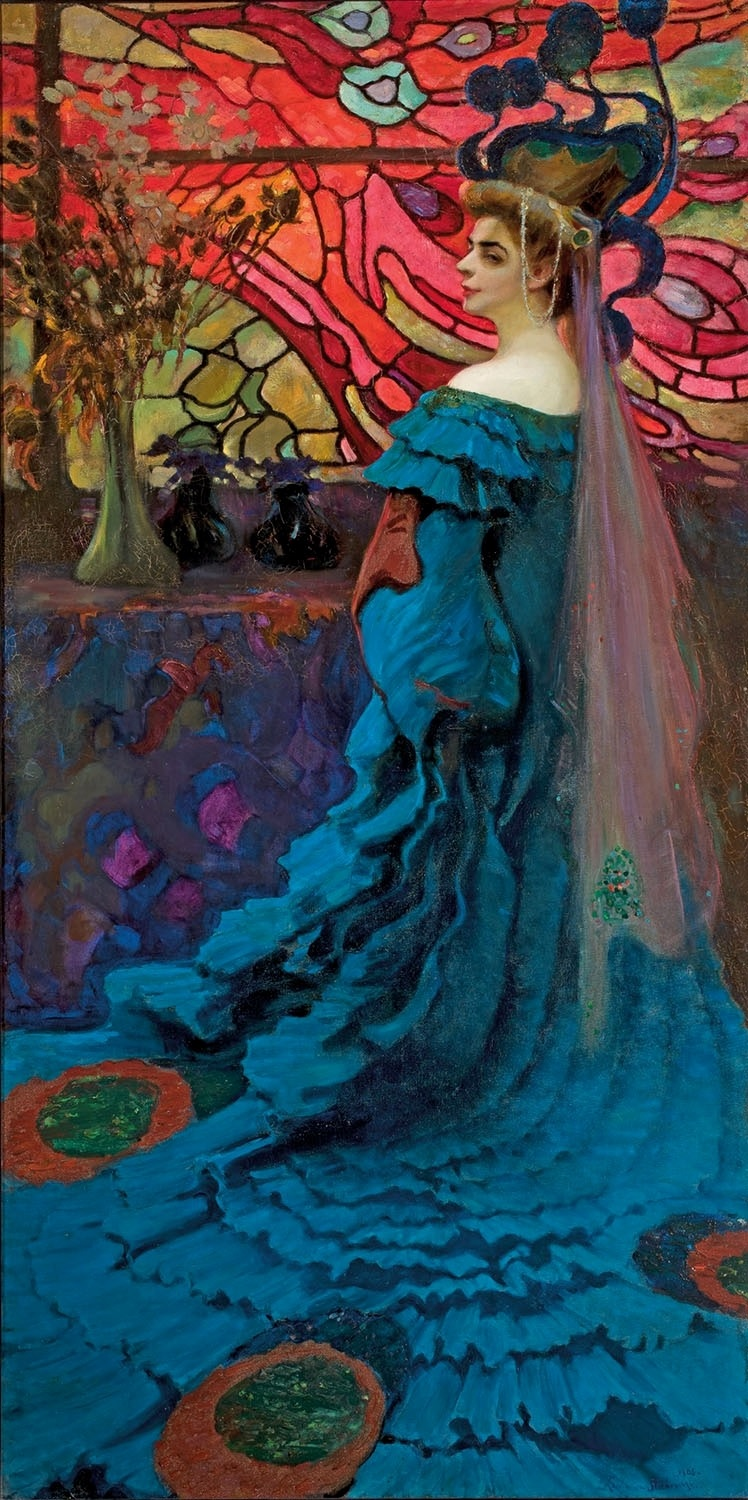
Against a Stained-glass, Peacock, Kazimierz Stabrowski

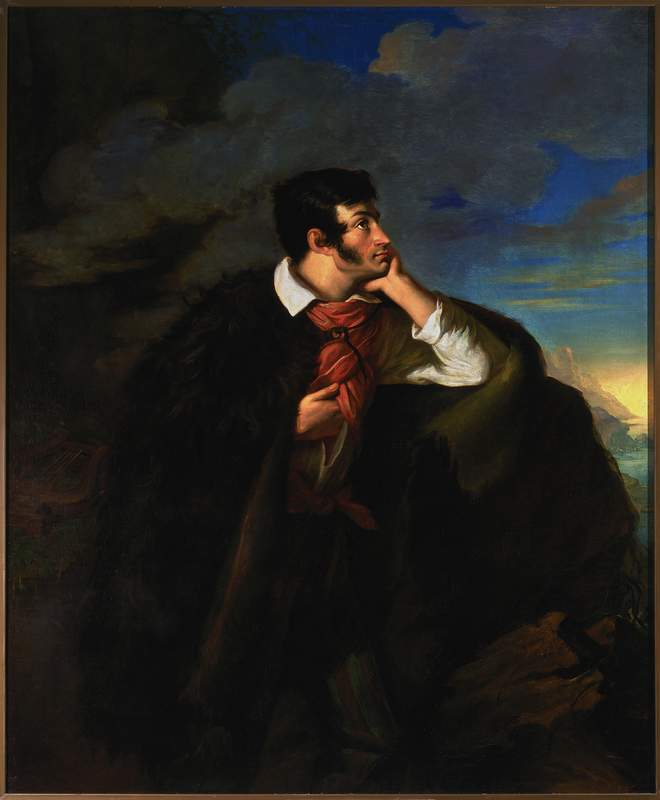
Adam Mickiewicz on the Ayu-Dag, Walenty Wańkowicz

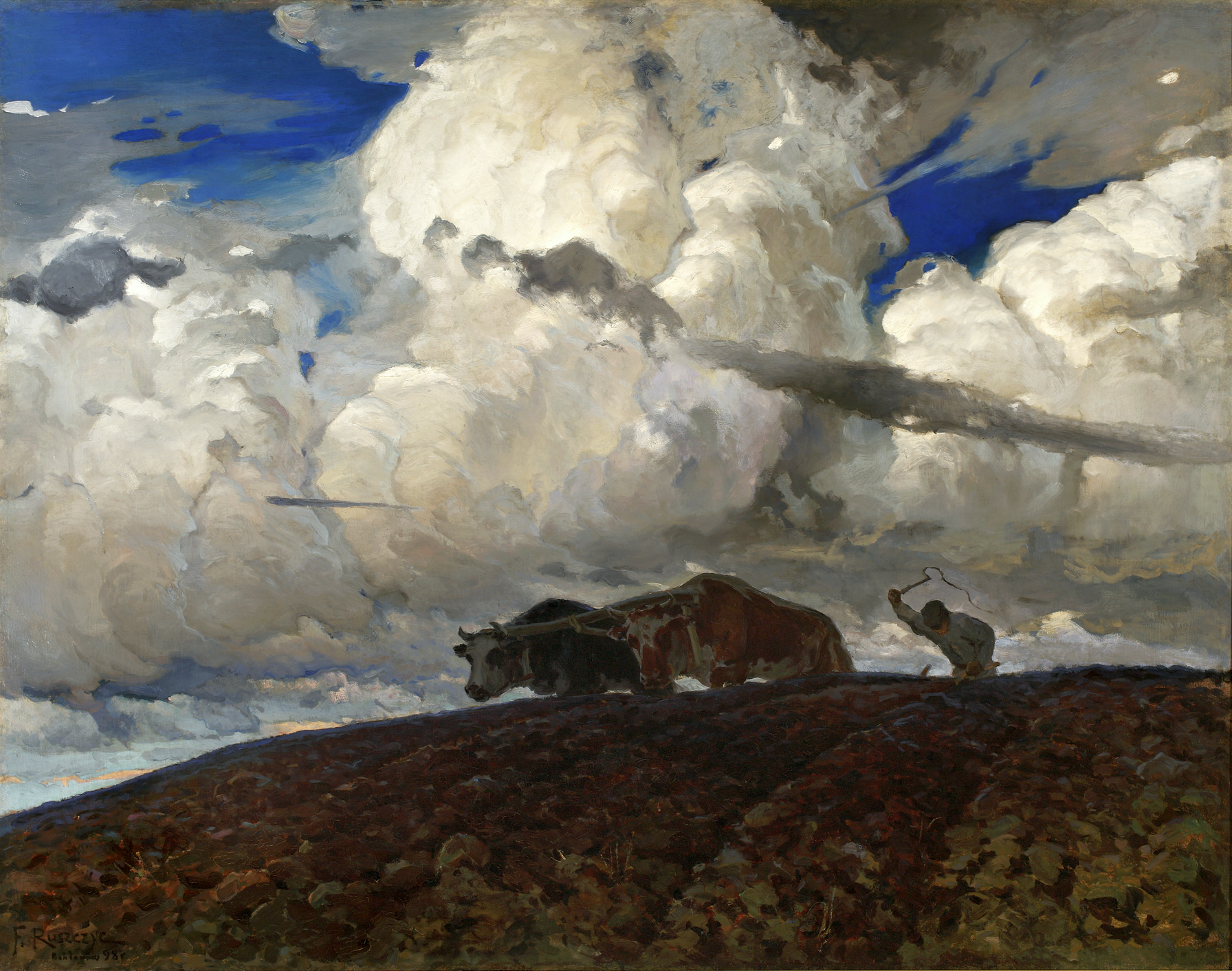
Soil, Ferdynand Ruszczyc

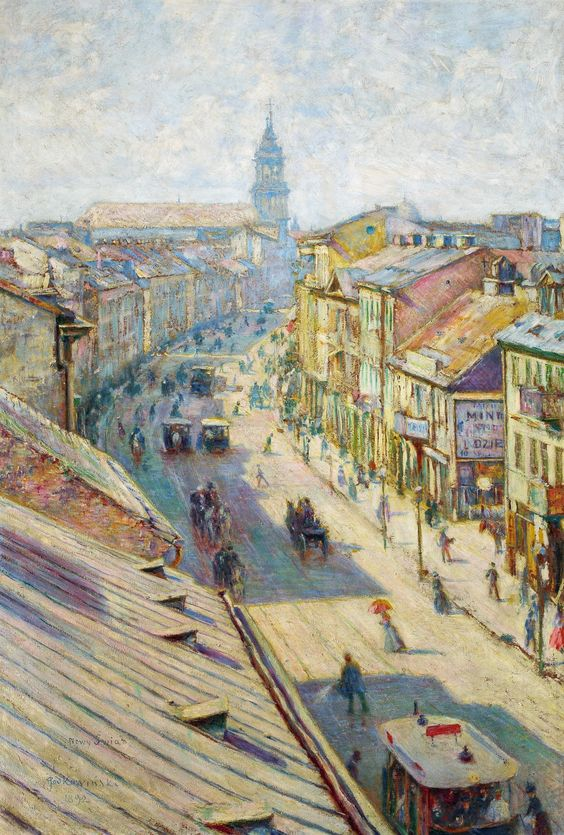
Nowy Świat Street in Warsaw on a Summer Day, Władysław Podkowiński

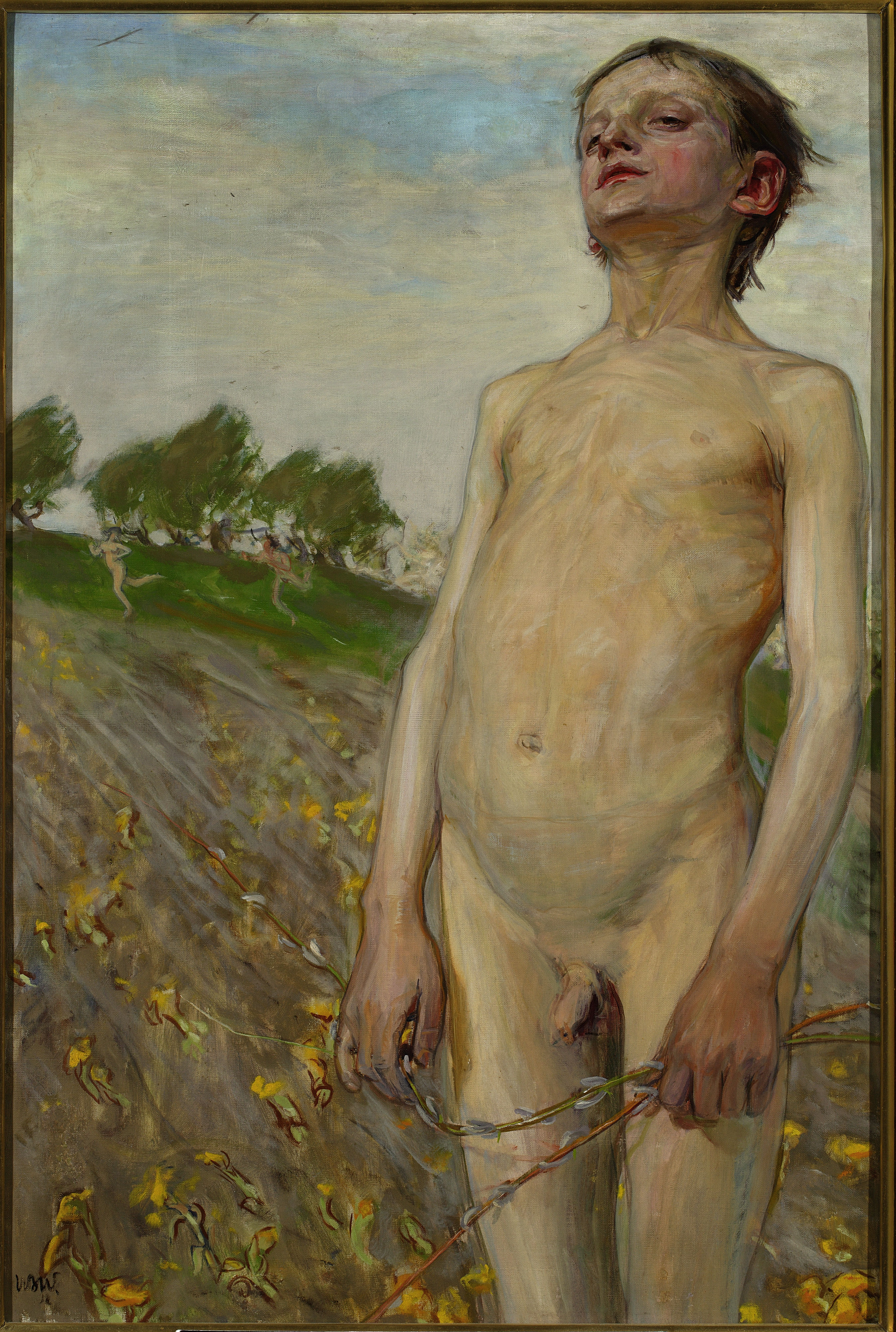
Springtime, Wojciech Weiss

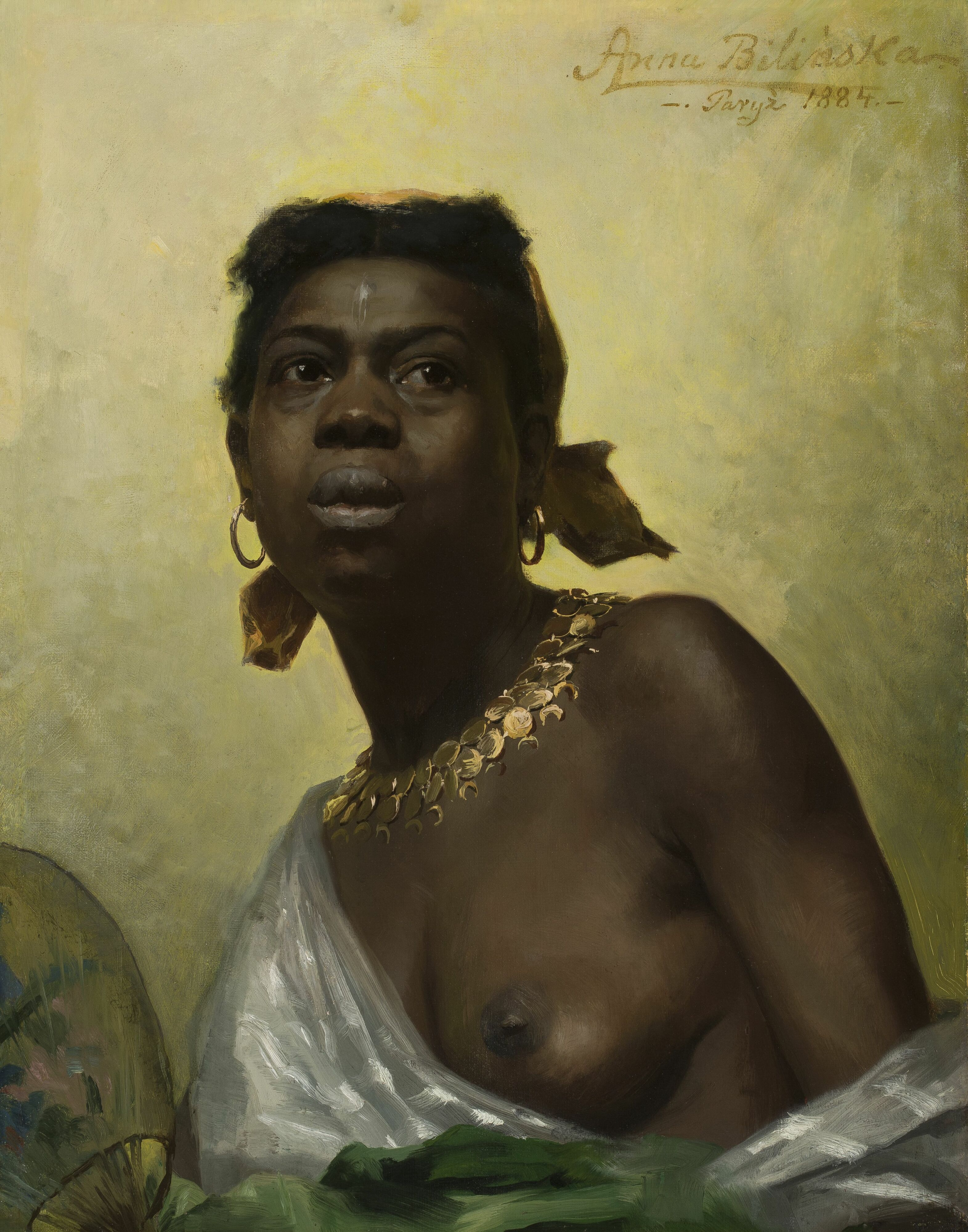
A Negress, Anna Bilińska-Bohdanowiczowa

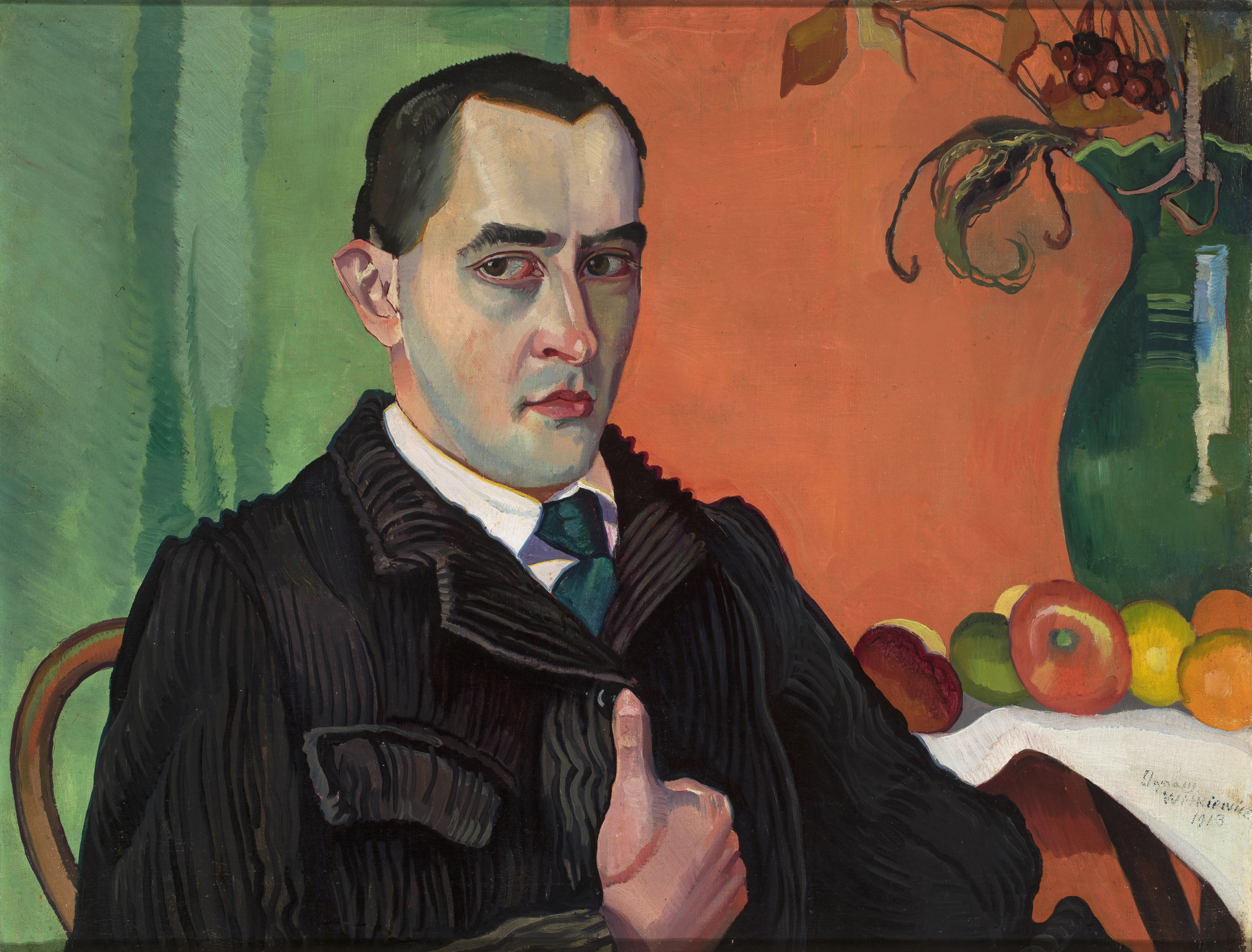
Self-portrait, Stanisław Ignacy Witkiewicz

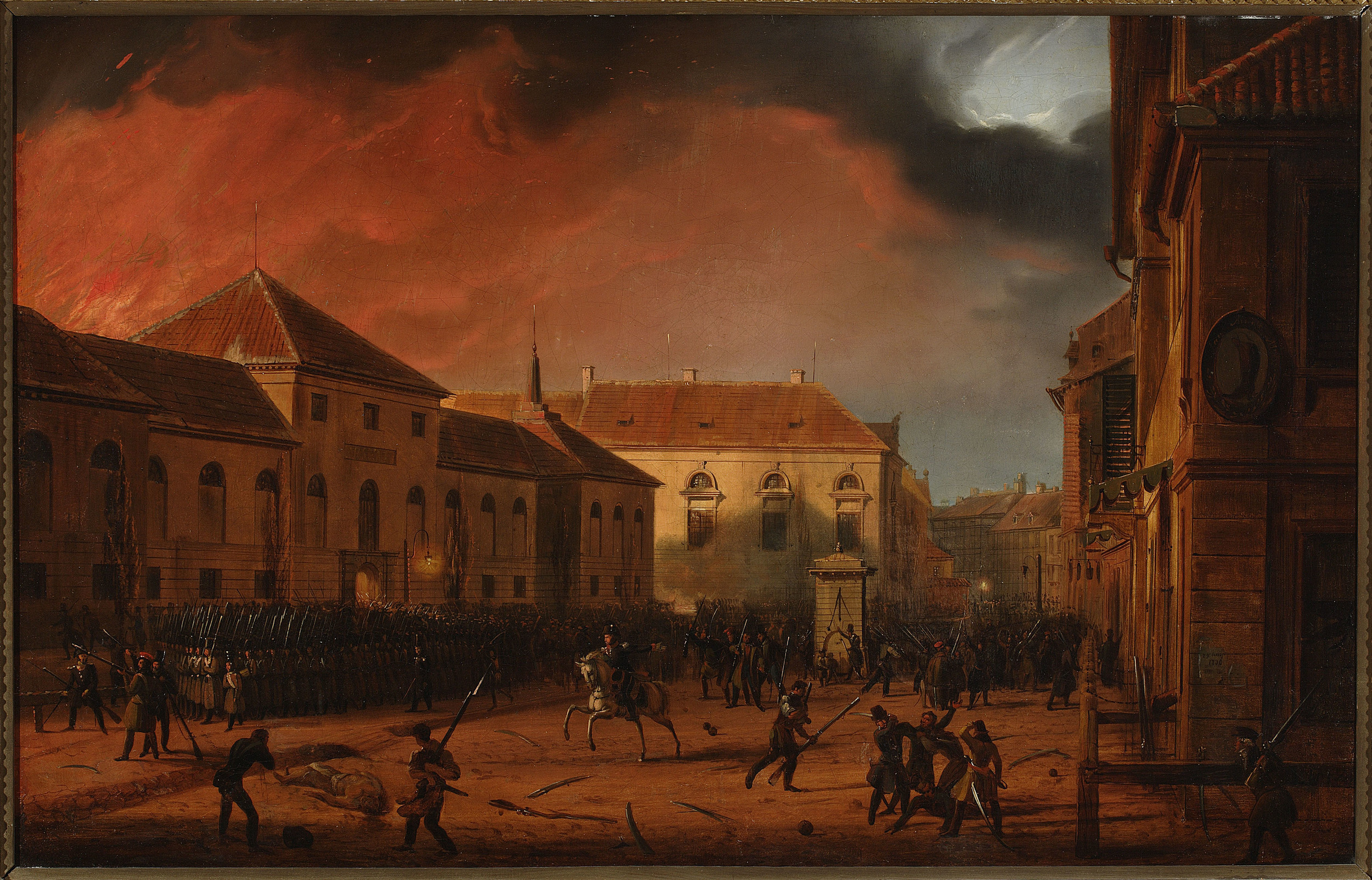
Taking of the Warsaw Arsenal, Marcin Zaleski

==== Sculpture ====
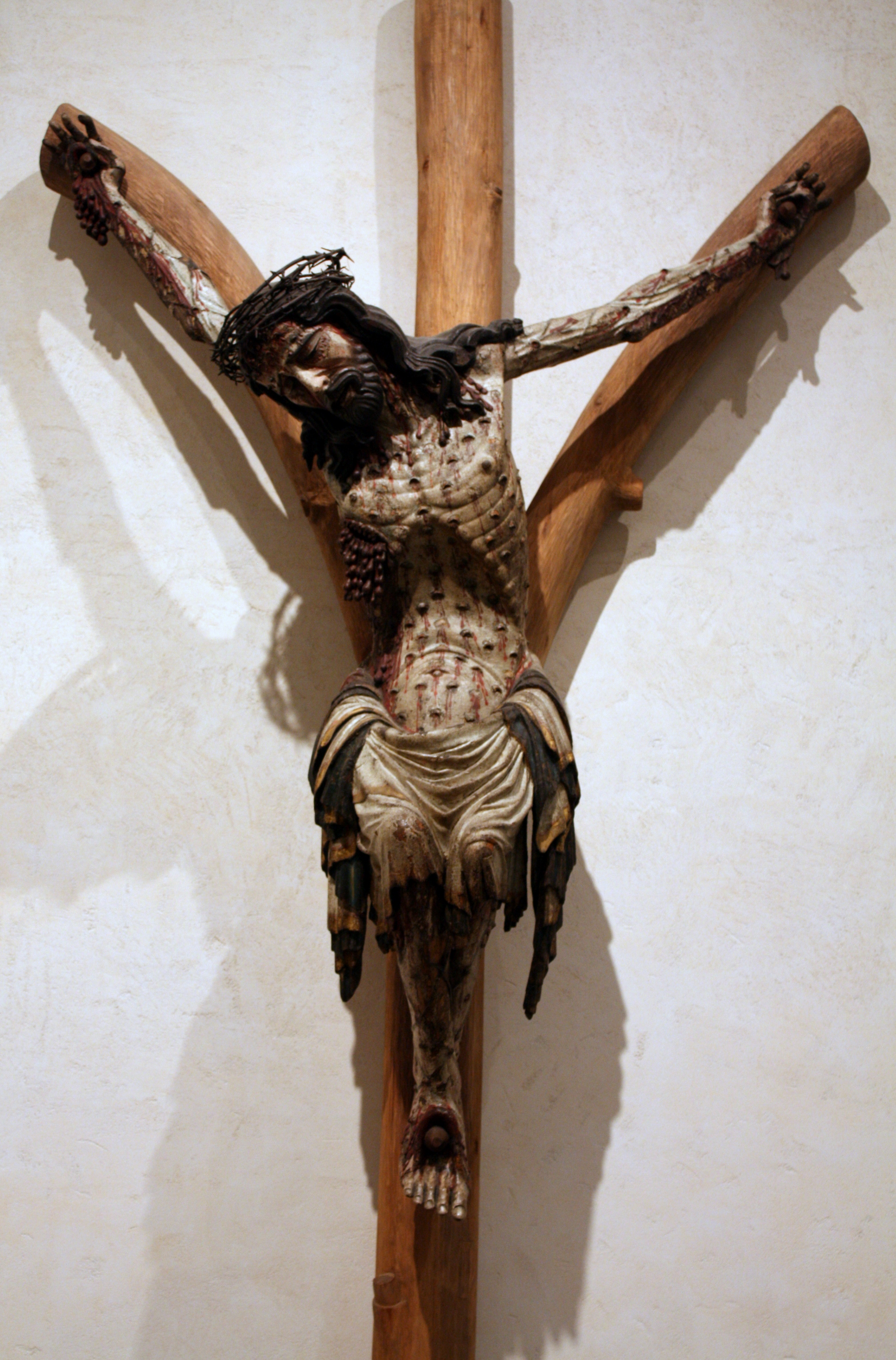
Crucifixus dolorosus of the Corpus Christi Church in Wrocław, c. 1360

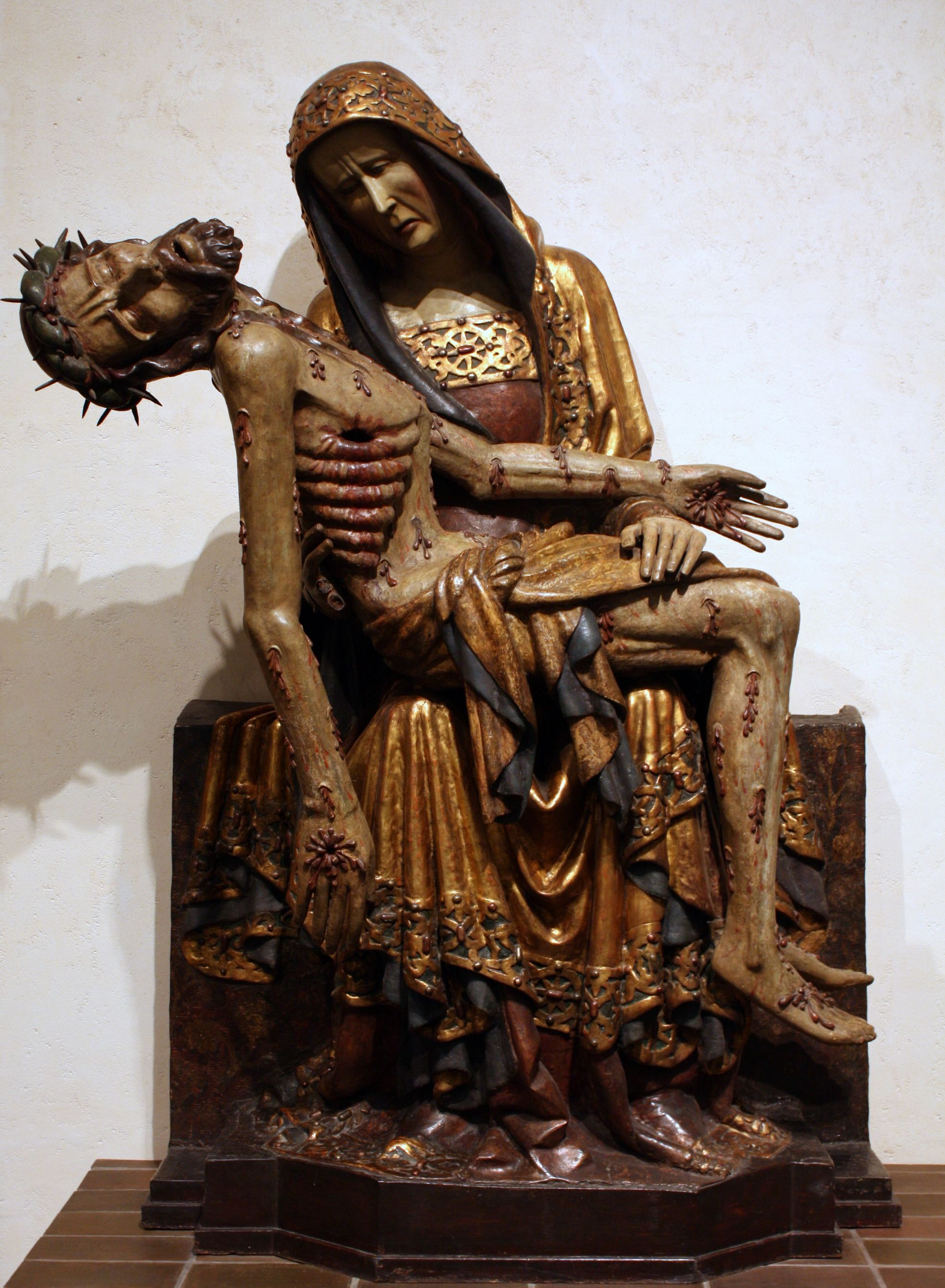
Pietà of the Lubiąż Abbey, c. 1360-1370

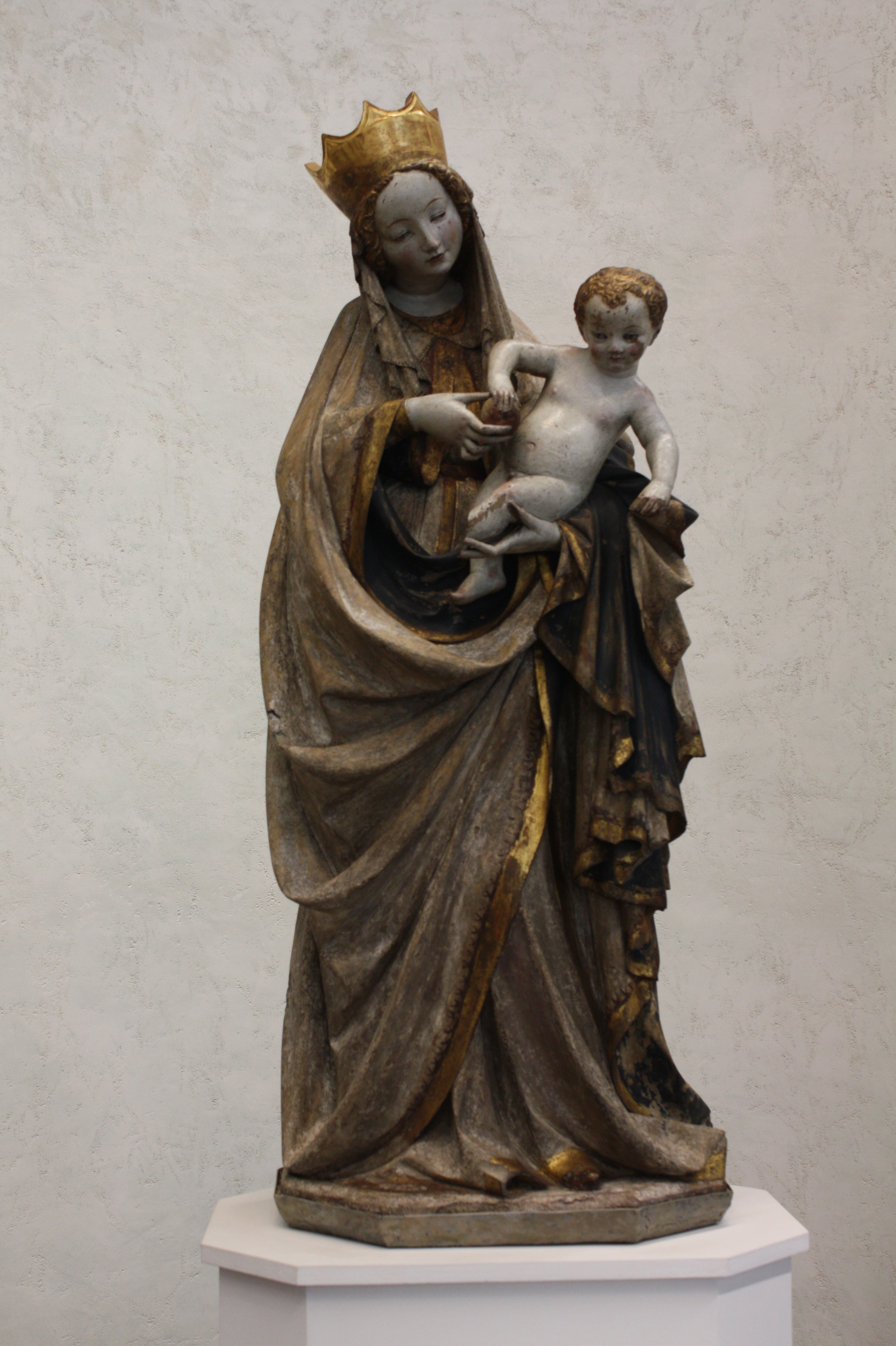
Beautiful Madonna of Wrocław, c. 1390

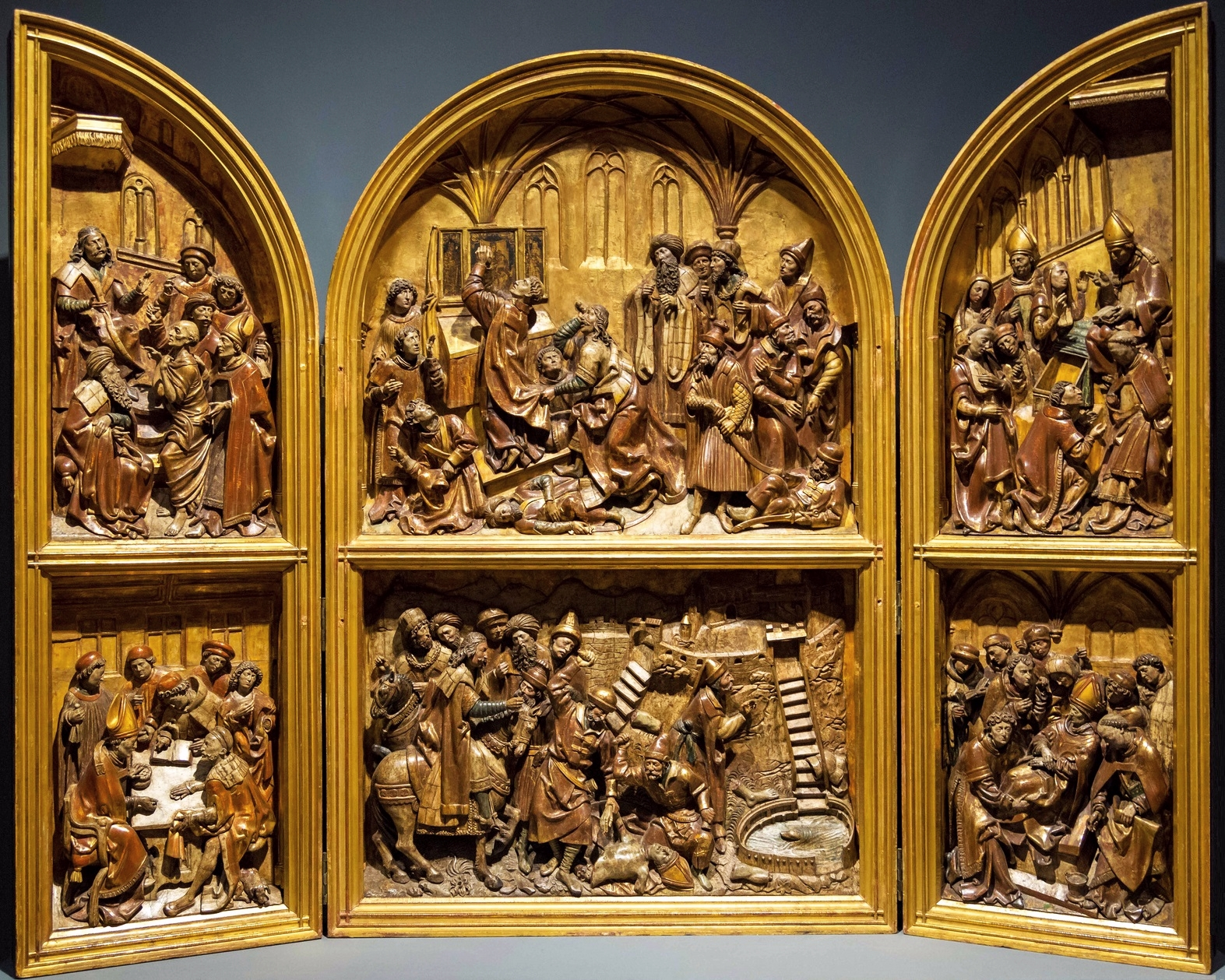
Pławno altar, c. 1512

== Directors ==
- Justynian Karnicki (1862–1876)
- Cyprian Lachnicki (1876–1906)
- Bronisław Gembarzewski (1916–1935)
- Stanisław Lorentz (1935–1982)
- Ferdynand Bohdan Ruszczyc (1995–2007)
- Dorota Folga-Januszewska (acting, 2007–2008)
- Andrzej Miecznikowski (2007–2009)
- Piotr Piotrowski (2009–2010)
- Agnieszka Morawińska (2010–2018)
- Piotr Rypson (acting, 2018–2018)
- Jerzy Miziołek (2018–2019)
- Łukasz Gaweł (acting, 2019–2020)
- Łukasz Gaweł (2020 – 2 February 2024)
- Agnieszka Lajus (acting assignment, February 2024 – February 2025)
- Agnieszka Lajus (1 February 2025 – present)

== See also ==
- Porczyński Gallery
- Museum of King John III's Palace at Wilanów
- Museums in Poland
