= Ignacy Korwin-Milewski =

Polish-Lithuanian art collector

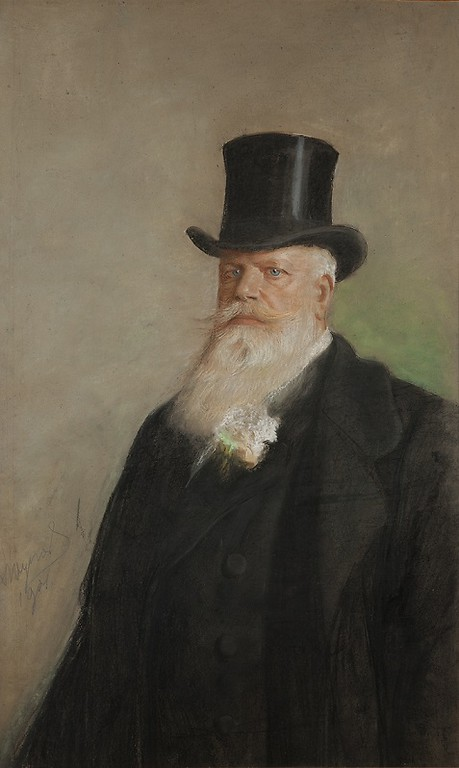
- Portrait of Ignacy Korwin-Milewski, by Leon Wyczółkowski
- Born: 27 April 1846; Hieraniony, Russian Empire
- Died: 16 October 1926 (aged 80); Pula, Italy
- Education: Imperial University of Dorpat
- Occupation: art collector

Ignacy Karol Korwin-Milewski (Lithuanian: Ignotas Karolis Korvin–Milevskis; 27 April 1846 – 16 October 1926) was a Polish-Lithuanian art collector, political writer and traveler.

== Biography ==
Korwin-Milewski was born into a landowning, noble family. His parents were Oskar Korwin-Milewski and Weronika née Wołk-Łaniewska. His older brother was Hipolit Korwin-Milewski. In 1856–1863, he lived in Paris where he studied at Lycée Bonaparte. He continued his studies of law at the Imperial University of Dorpat in 1865–1868. There he belonged to the student corporation "Polonia", but maintained contacts mainly with the Baltic German nobility. In 1870–1875, he studied painting in Munich, where he found himself in the circle of Polish artists. He himself was not a talented painter, although he took part in the Paris Salon in 1874, where he exhibited a portrait of Maria Kwilecka née Mańkowska. He quickly gave up painting.

In the winter of 1875, he went to Rome, where he was made a Knight of Malta and received from the papal chancellery the title of Count for himself, his father and brother. His brother and father, however, did not accept the title, often signing themselves as "not a count". He also augmentated his Ślepowron coat of arms, and called the new coat of arms "Milan".

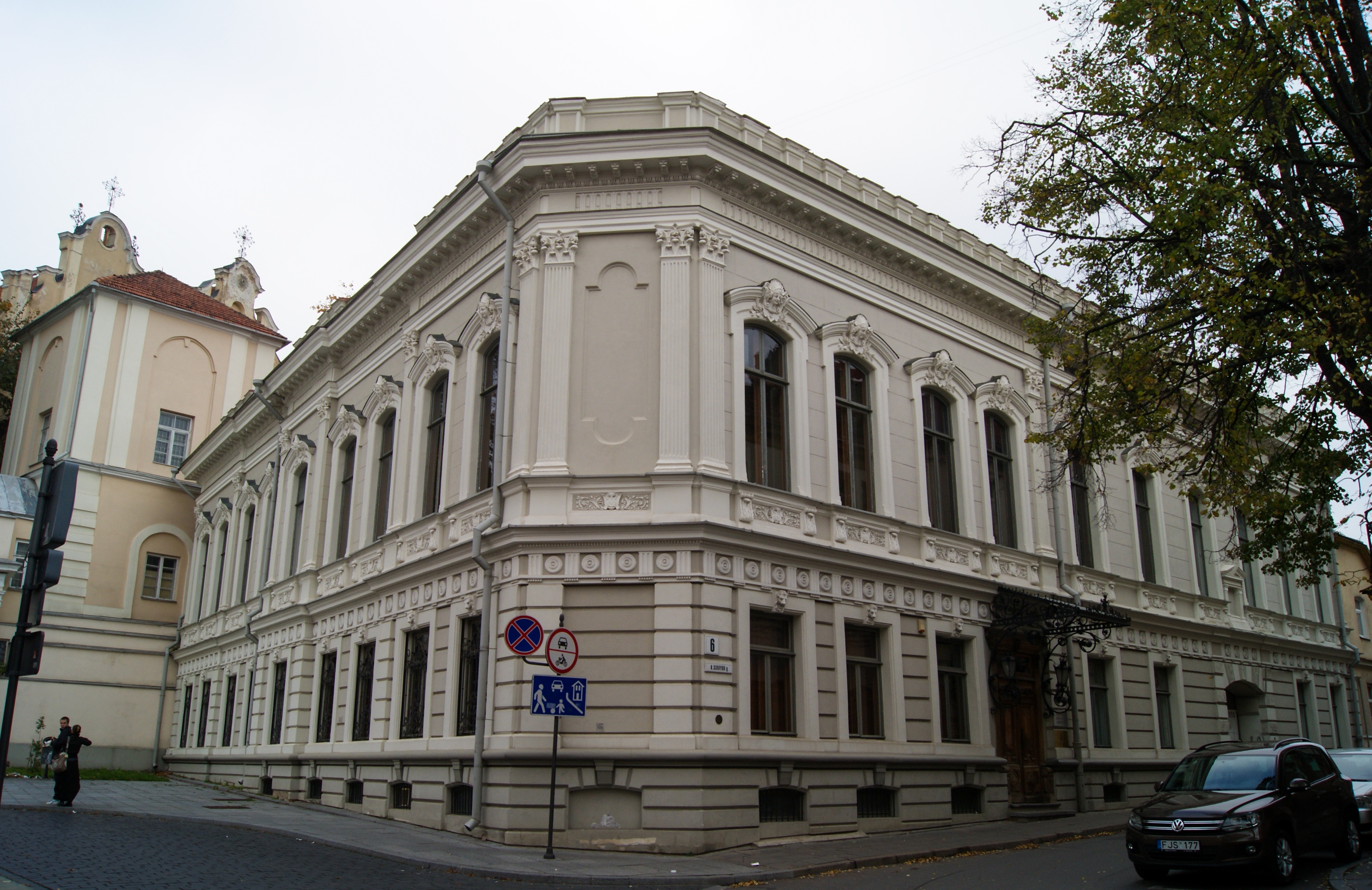
Korwin-Milewski's palace in Vilnius, today a Lithuanian Writers' Union Palace

In 1877, he took over his mother's large estate, which gave him financial independence and allowed him to live the life of an art collector and philanthropist. In Vilnius he built a residence for himself on St. George Street (present-day Gediminas Avenue).

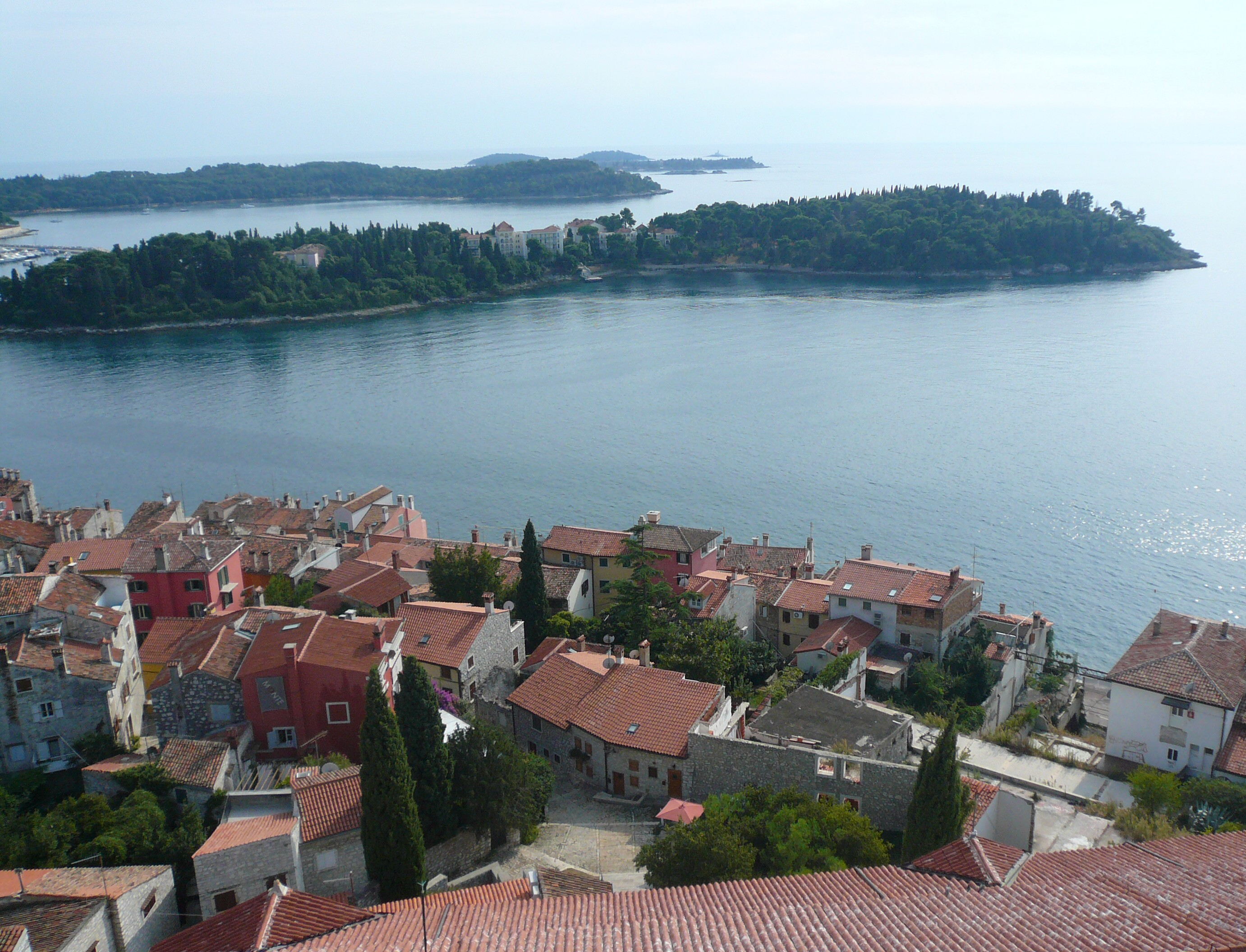
View on the Santa Caterina Island near Rovinj

He was friends with Archduke Charles Stephen of Austria, from whom he bought the steam yacht "Christa" and, after renaming it "Litwa", made long-distance voyages for 20 years, which he described in semi-anonymous publications. In 1900, together with the Archduke he travelled from Kiel to San Sebastián and Almería to visit the Spanish Queen Maria Christina. In 1905, he bought from the Archduke the exterritorial island of Santa Caterina near Istria, where he intended to establish a luxury spa and sanatorium. The outbreak of war prevented him from realizing these intentions.

In 1922, he suffered a stroke that largely incapacitated him. He spent the rest of his life on his island. He died on 16 October 1926 in Pula and was buried in the cemetery in Rovigno d'Istria.

== Family and personal life ==
His brother Hipolit Korwin-Milewski was active in politics and patronage of the arts. Both brothers did not like each other, and in the later period were even hostile to each other. After 1905, he married Janina Zofia Ostroróg Sadowska, the widow of Władysław Umiastowski, who was a patron of science and the founder of the J. Z. Umiastowska Roman Foundation in 1944. Their marriage was childless, the spouses were living apart. After a stroke, Korwin-Milewski publicly insulted his wife, who began to pursue him in court.

== Art collection and patronage ==
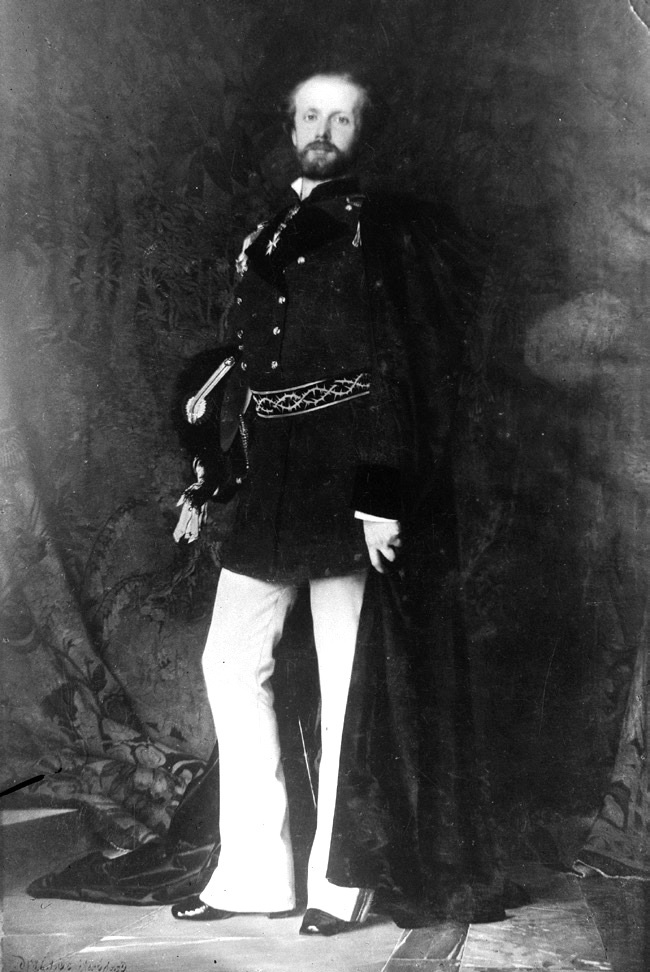
Portrait of Ignacy Korwin-Milewski in the Order of Malta uniform, painted by Władysław Czachórski in 1876. The painting was lost

Korwin-Milewski has been collecting art all his life. Especially in 1880–1895 when he collected over 200 works. According to Milewski, Polish national characteristics came to the surface in certain historical periods, and this is what happened in relation to Polish painting of the late 19th century. At the same time he considered the French influence to be disastrous, so he defined the scope of his collecting as follows: "wishing to have a collection more or less complete and constituting an original whole (...) I acquire paintings of the fellow-countrymen artists, currently living, and among them only those who belong or belonged to the Munich school". Later he relaxed these criteria and collected paintings also from outside the Munich school. Art historian Andrzej Ryszkiewicz described his collection as "one of the most consciously collected, most valuable and most beautiful of the Polish paintings collections". His collection included paintings of:

- Jan Matejko (Stańczyk)
- Franciszek Żmurko
- Juliusz Kossak
- Józef Brandt
- Michał Gorstkin-Wywiórski
- Tadeusz Ajdukiewicz
- Zdzisław Jasiński
- Roman Kochanowski
- Leopold Loeffler
- Franciszek Streitt
- Aleksander Gierymski (The Feast of Trumpets, Peasant Coffin, Paris Opera at night, Prayer of the Angelus Domini, Jewish woman with lemons and 25 others)
- Józef Chełmoński (Indian Summer, Horse market in Balta, Scene from the Uprising of 1863, Girl with a jug and others)
- Władysław Czachórski (Actors before Hamlet)
- Józef Pankiewicz (Market for vegetables in the square behind the Iron Gate)
- Stanisław Witkiewicz (Funeral in the countryside)
- Witold Pruszkowski (Martyrdom of the Uniates)
- Wincenty Wodzinowski (Harvesters resting)
- Leon Wyczółkowski (Fishing for crayfish)
- Anna Bilińska (Portrait of a Young Woman with a Rose in her Hand)
- Bolesław Szańkowski (Portrait of Józef Brandt)
- Jacek Malczewski (Portrait of Michał Gorstkin-Wywiórski)
- Alfred Wierusz-Kowalski (Postilion)
- Piotr Michałowski

Korwin-Milewski commissioned a set of about 20 self-portraits from various Polish artists, which were also included in the collection. In creating his collection of self-portraits, Milewski modelled it on a similar one held at the Uffizi in Florence.

Gallery of self-portraits of Polish artists commissioned by Ignacy Korwin-Milewski
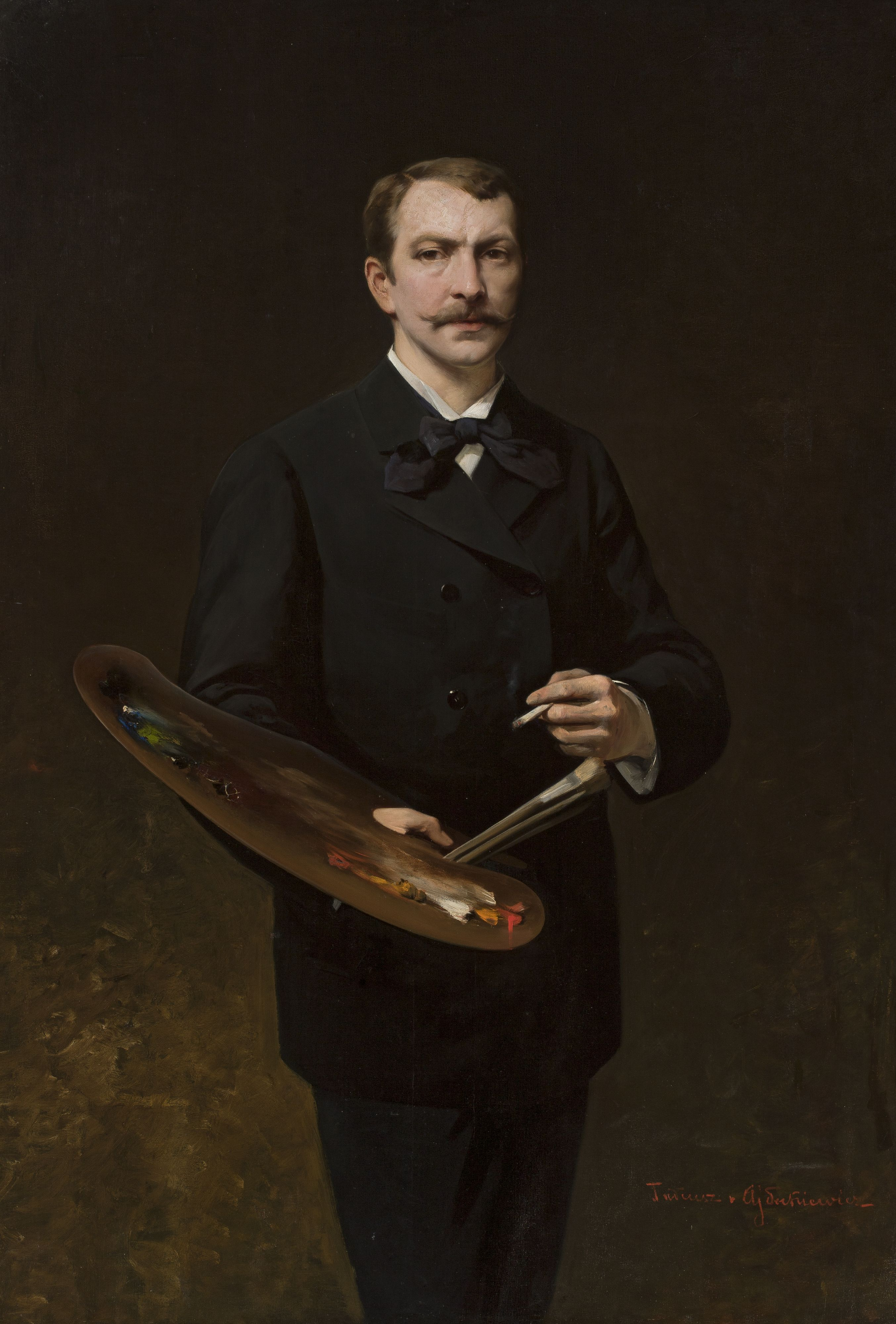
Tadeusz Ajdukiewicz, 1880s

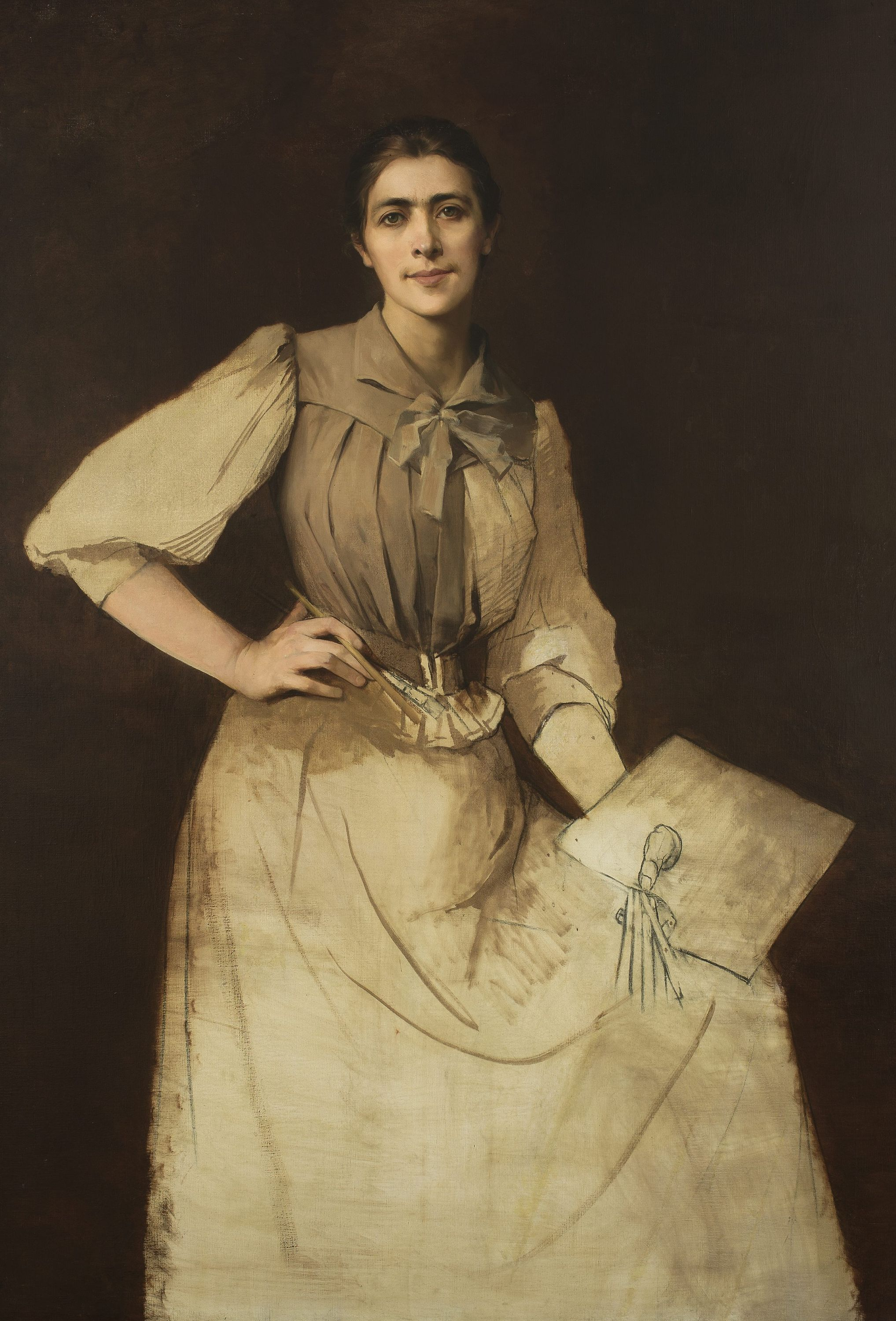
Anna Bilińska (unfinished, 1892)

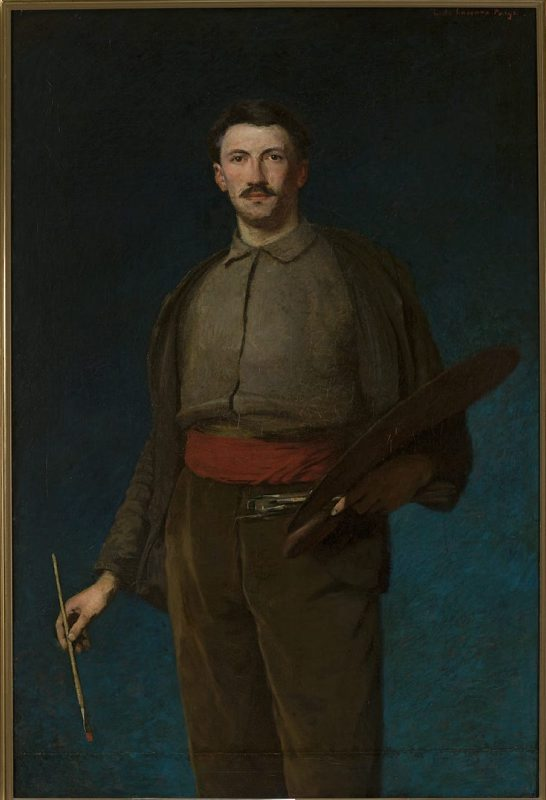
Ludwik de Laveaux (1892)

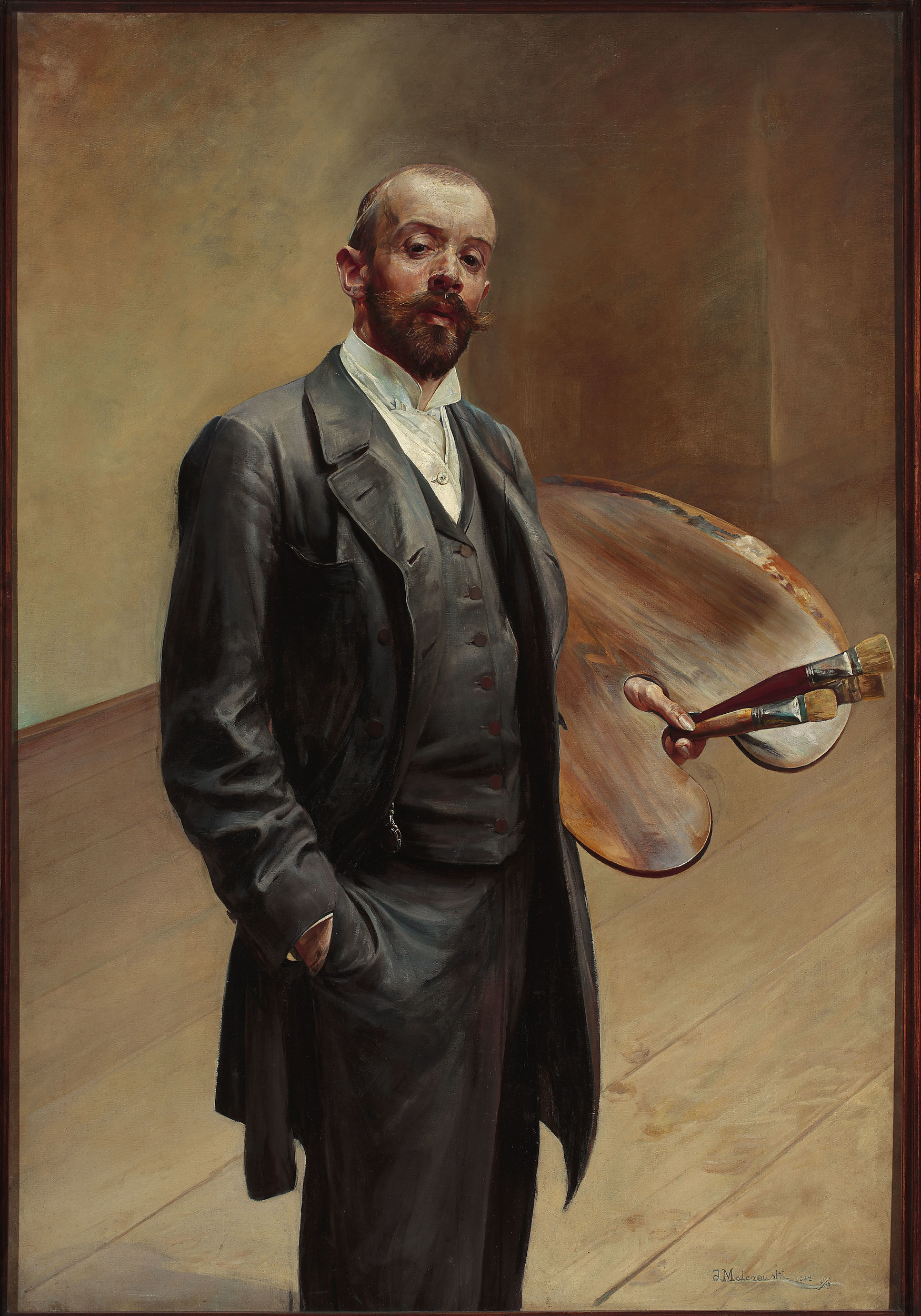
Jacek Malczewski (1892)

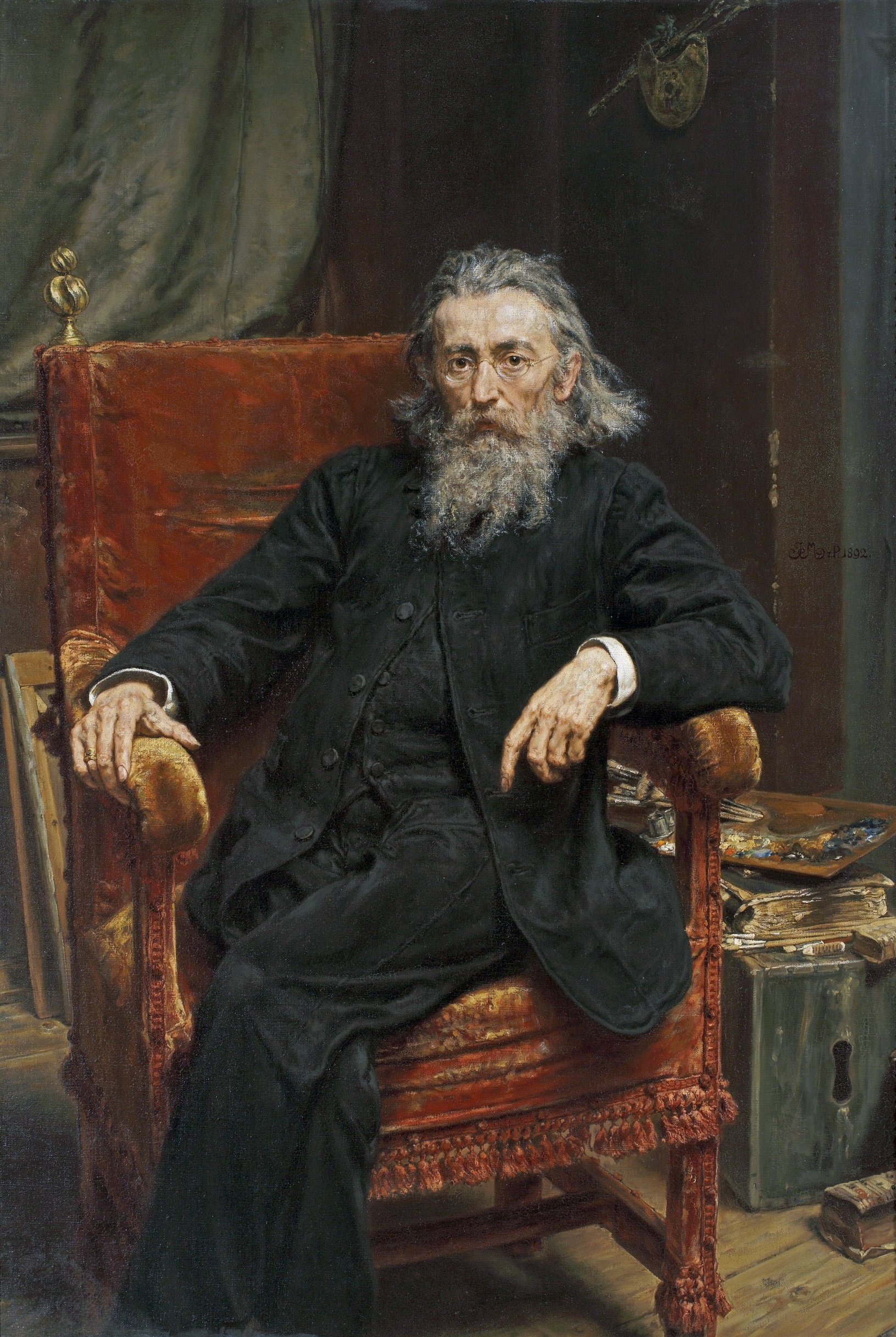
Jan Matejko (1892)

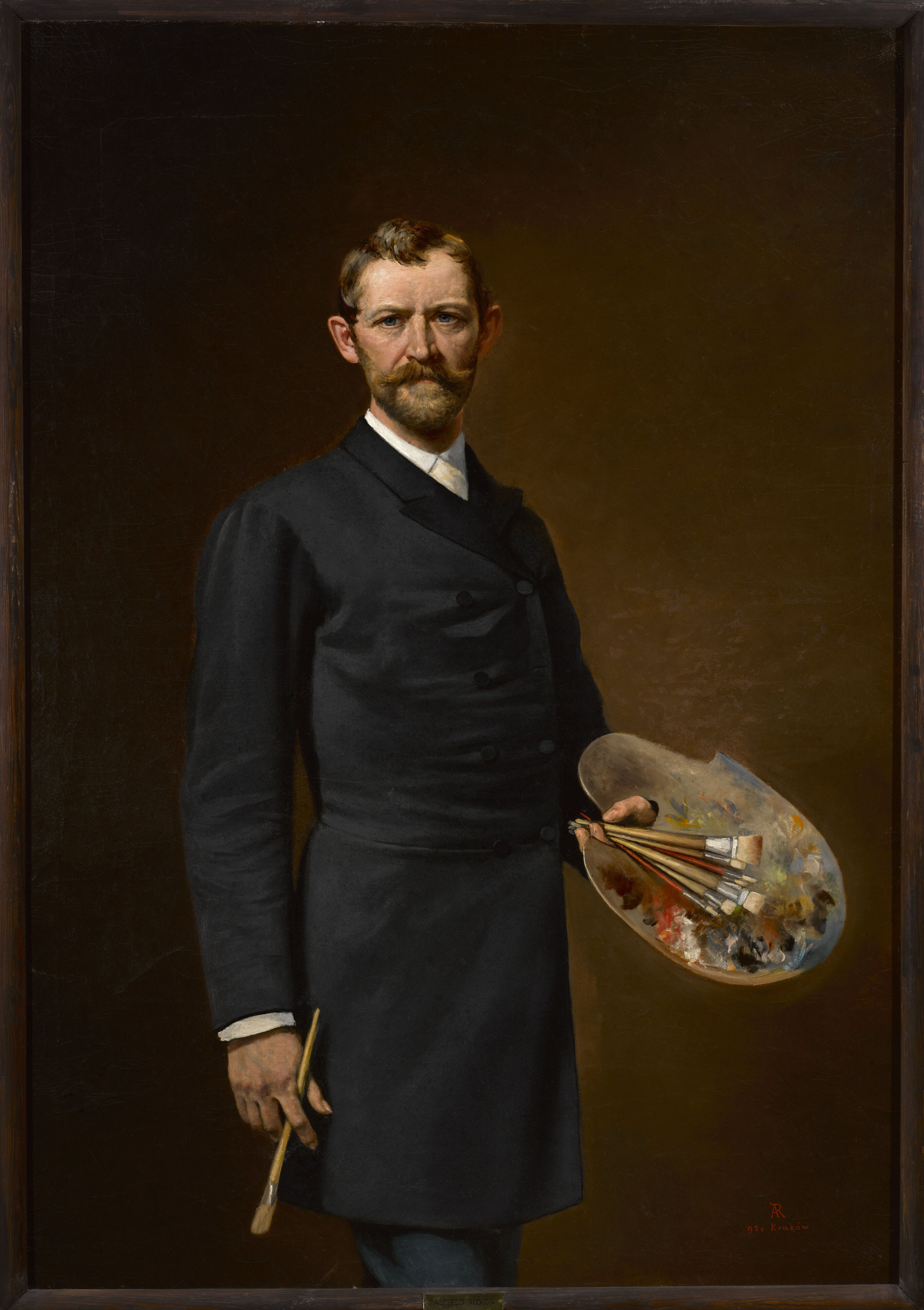
Alfred Izydor Römer (1892)

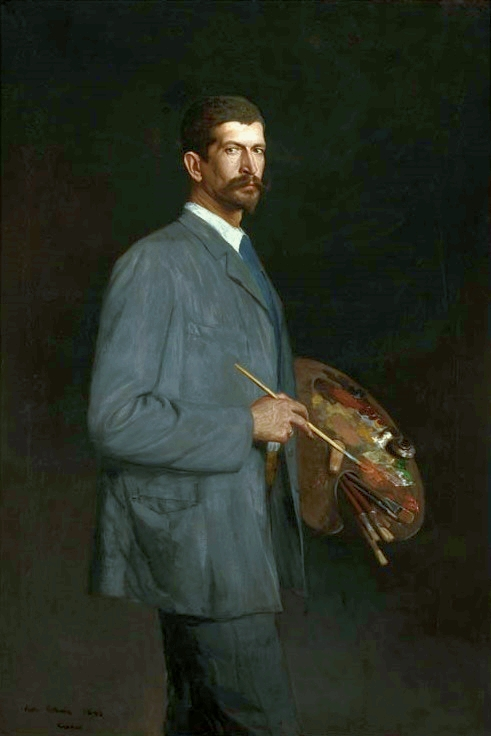
Antoni Piotrowski (1893)

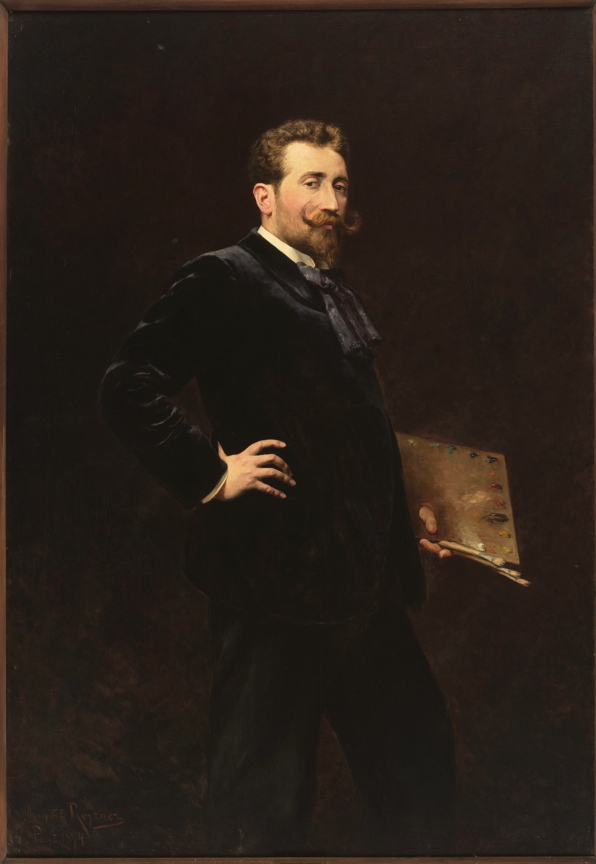
Mieczysław Reyzner (1894)

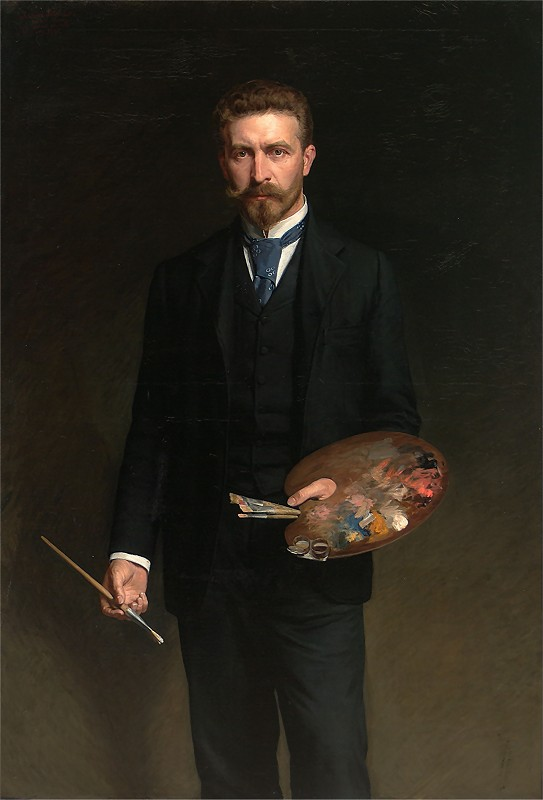
Kazimierz Teofil Pochwalski (1895)

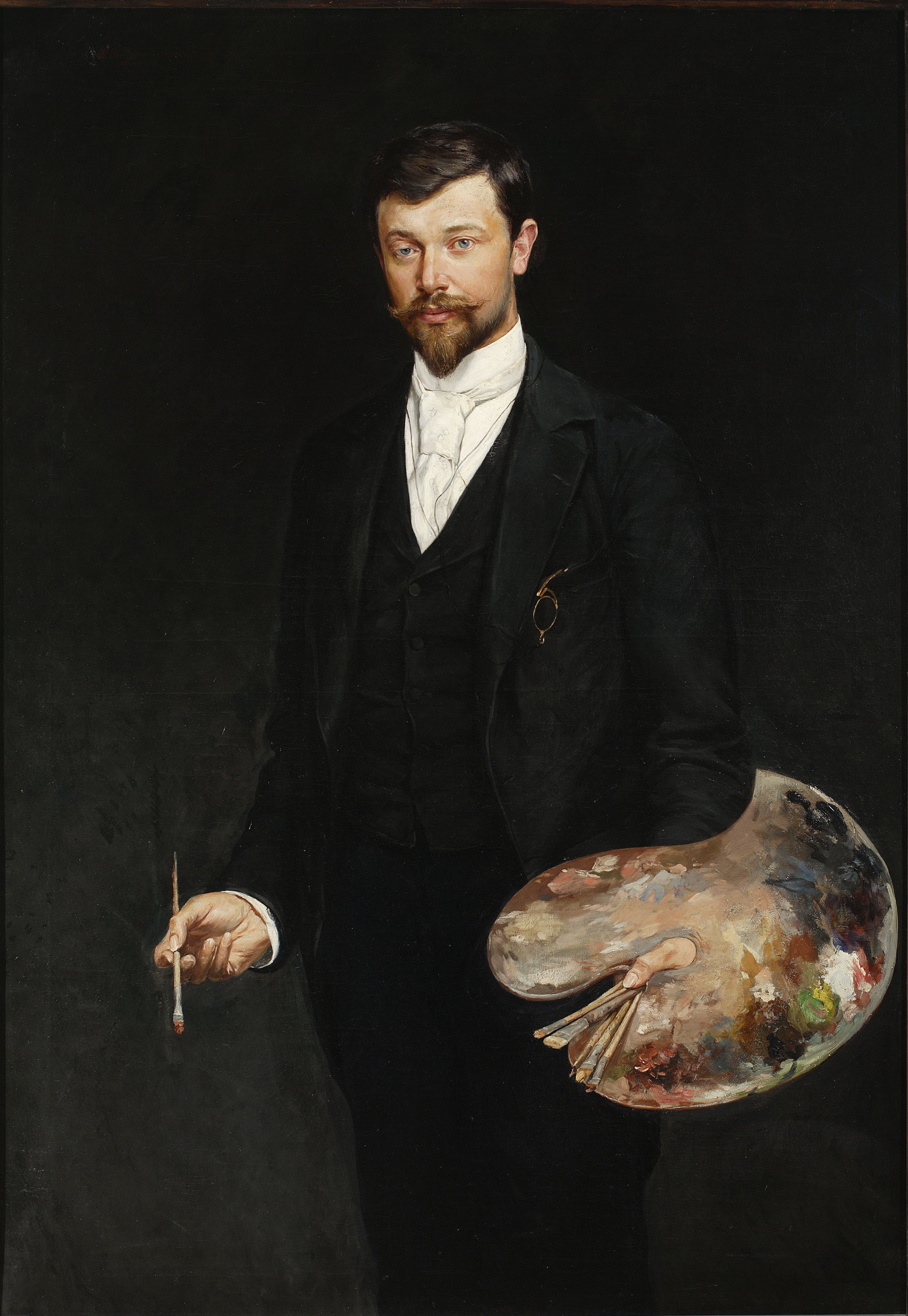
Wincenty Wodzinowski (1895)

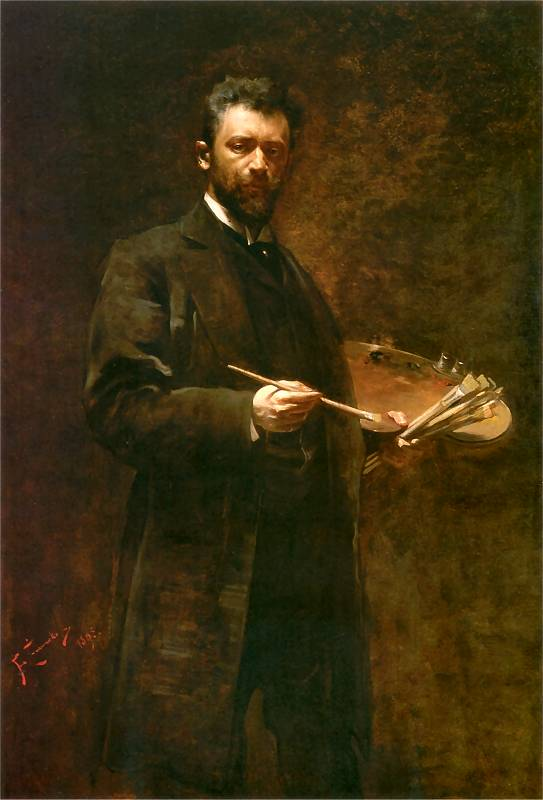
Franciszek Żmurko (1895)

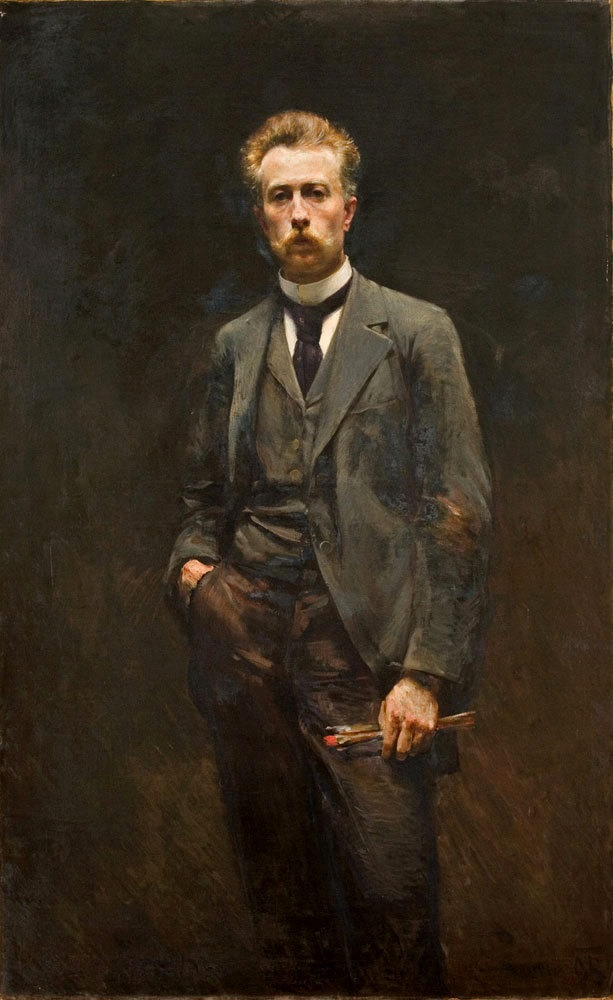
Aleksander Augustynowicz (1895)

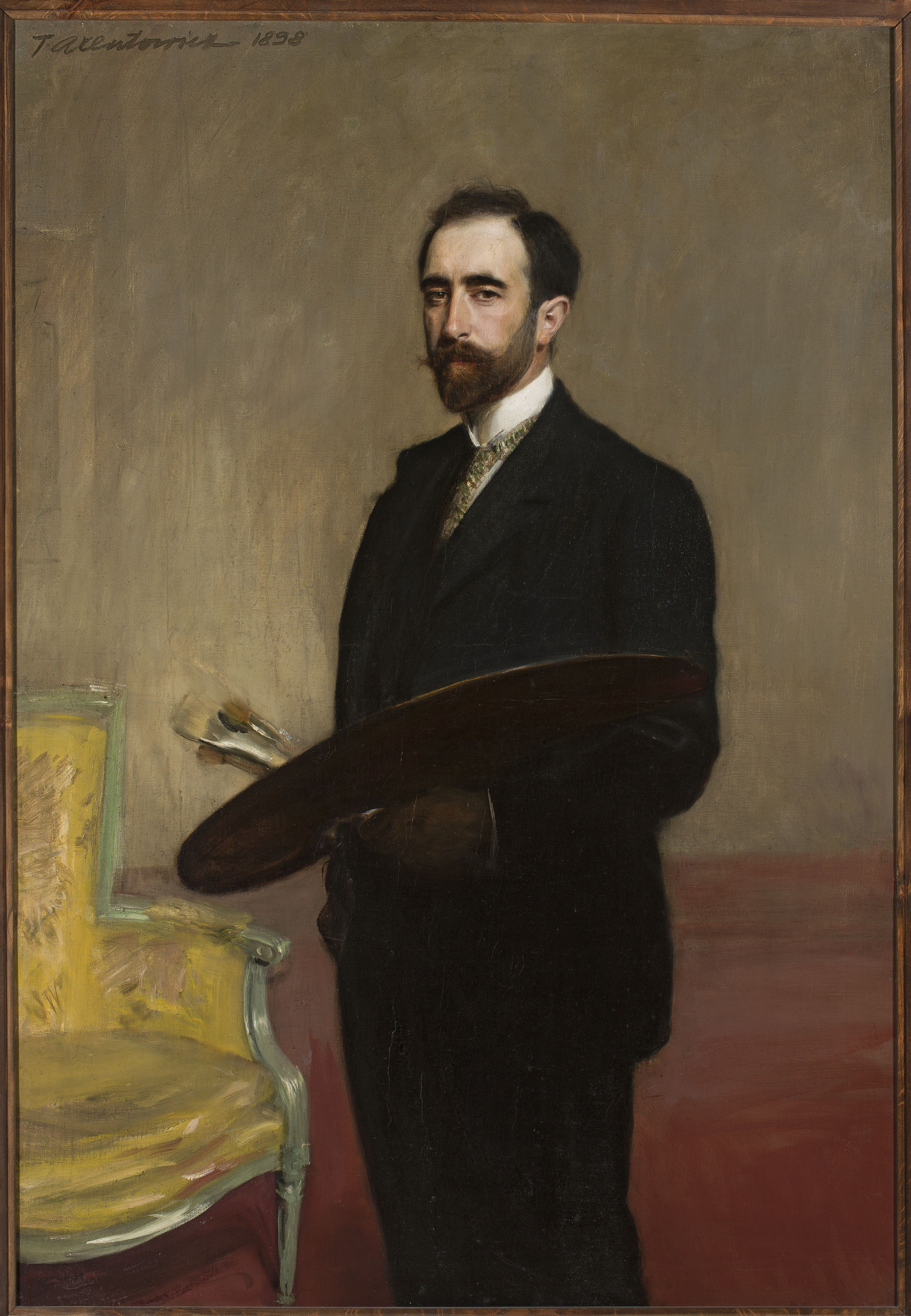
Teodor Axentowicz (1898)

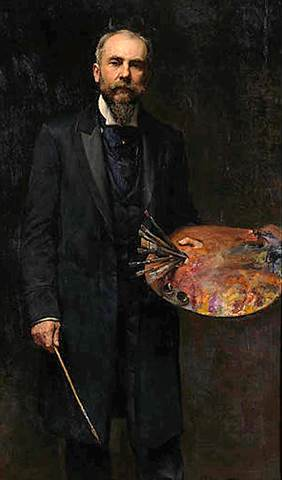
Józef Męcina-Krzesz (1900)

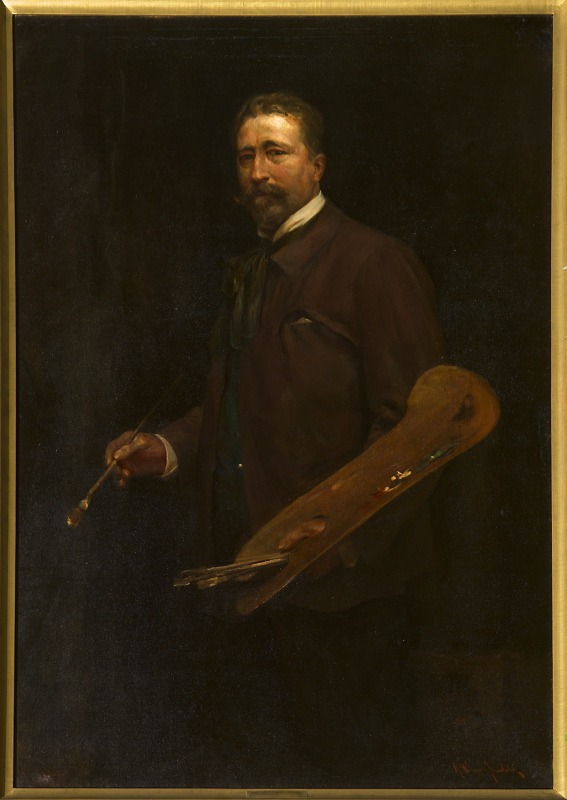
Alfred Wierusz-Kowalski (1900)

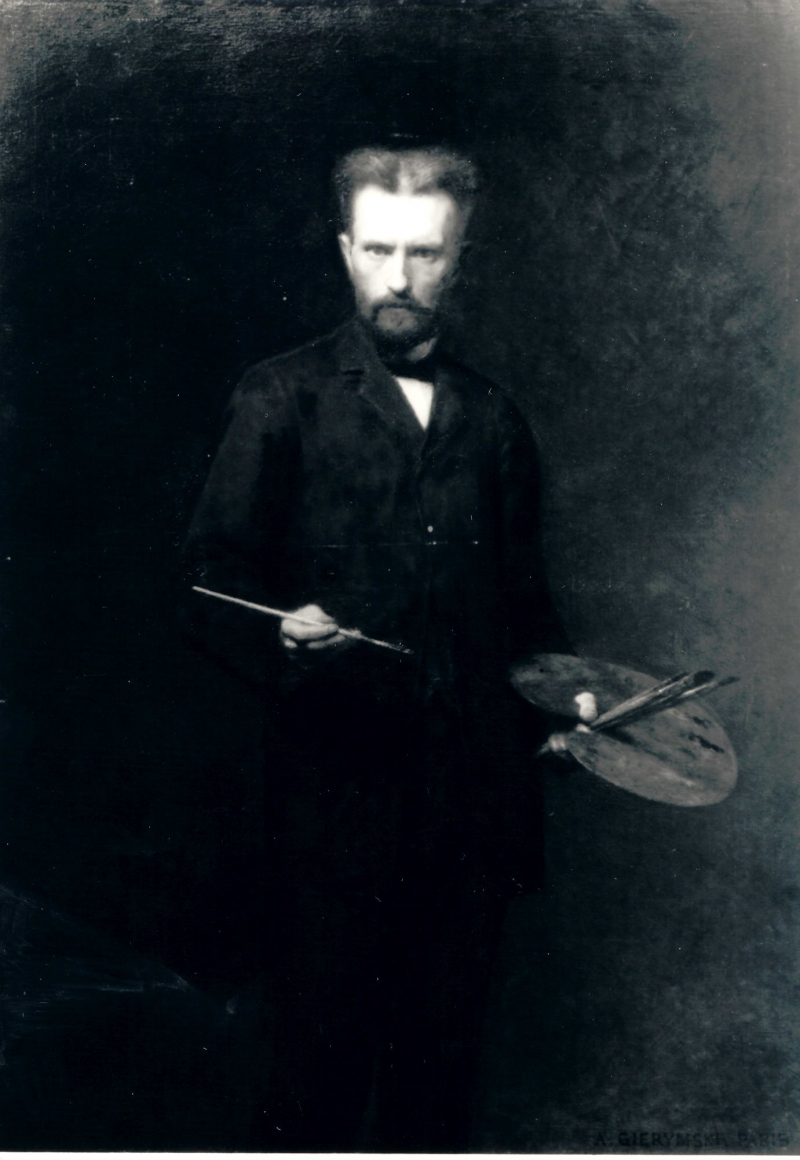
Aleksander Gierymski (lost during World War II, c. 1900)

Korwin-Milewski planned to build a gallery building in which he would make his collection accessible to the public, but was unable to reach an agreement with the authorities in Kraków and Lviv. Until 1893, the paintings were located in Vienna, then in Lviv and again in Vienna. In 1897, they were moved to the family estate in Hieraniony, then to Santa Caterina Island. In 1915, they were returned to Vienna. After the First World War the collection dispersed. This was connected with Ignacy Milewski's financial problems related to numerous lawsuits, so he was forced to sell his collection. Some of the works were bought by the National Museum in Warsaw (gallery of self-portraits and Stańczyk), some were found in private collections around the world. Several paintings was bought by the lawyer Emil Merwin, who represented Milewski in Vienna. They became the basis of his own collection of Polish paintings. Merwin's collection was found in the US in 1968, but attempts to bring it back to Poland were unsuccessful. The entire collection was purchased by a Viennese antiquarian, Czesław Bednarczyk, who then sold the paintings to private buyers. A significant part of the collection was bought from Milewski by the Warsaw antiquarian Abe Gutnajer, who donated some of the paintings to the National Museum. Gutnajer ran two antique shops in Warsaw. One of them, at 16 Mazowiecka Street, was completely burnt down by a German bomb in September 1939. The other, at number 11 on Mazowiecka Street, was looted by the Germans during the occupation. To this day, the fate of most of the works from Gutnajer's collection is unknown.

Today a large part of Milewski's collection is held by the National Museum in Warsaw.

He also supported artists with his wealth. From 1888, he paid a salary and financed Aleksander Gierymski's trip to Paris. He also founded a studio for Wincenty Wodzinowski in Swoszowice.

== Political views ==
Korwin-Milewski was conservative, representing a loyalist stance, and as an eccentric person, he manifested his political views in ways that shocked those around him. He felt he was a representative of the nobility of the Grand Duchy of Lithuania. He believed that the nobility should play a leading role, as opposed to democratic ideals, and criticised the emancipation reform of 1861. He believed that an agreement between the nobility and the people of the Lithuanian and Belarusian lands ("Belarusians Russians", Lithuanians and Jews) was impossible because they and the tsarist government were opposed to it. He believed that the Lithuanian nobility should be loyal to the Tsar, who in return would repay them by giving them a leading role in society, as he put it, composed of "a couple of million compact masses of Lithuanians and Samogitians", "Russified Belarusians" and "incalculable crowds of Jews".

He believed that the Lithuanian nobility was and should be separated from the nobility in the Crown of the Polish Kingdom. He acknowledged that the culture of the Lithuanian nobility was based on the principle of the reign of "absolute Polishness", but stressed that earlier it had based its development on the Ruthenian language and culture. He acknowledged that the special social conditions prevailing in the lands of the Grand Duchy of Lithuania demanded that the Lithuanian nobility discover its own identity as the only means of maintaining the integrity of these lands:

These six gubernias, inhabited by Samogitians, Lithuanians, Latvians, Black and White Ruthenians, native Russians, Old Believers, Tartars, and also by millions of Jews - in fact have only one thing in common, namely that in them the greater part of the landed property still in the beginning of the last century remained (...) in the hands of the nobility, speaking Polish, and in a certain - small part - even of Polish origin.

— Walka z kłamstwem, p. 17.

He was an enemy of "Polish demagogy", i.e. the Polish national democratic movement. He blamed the Polish national movement for two unsuccessful uprisings in 1830–1831 and 1863–1864 that depleted the nobility's property in Lithuania, so that "the outer Polish shell is disappearing" and the masses of the rural population are growing in strength. The solution for him was a full merger with the Russian nobility, as did it the German nobility in Livonia or the Georgian nobility.

We, the Lithuanian nobility, are definitely unlucky with Polishness and that it is time, a great time, not to be torn left and right from one nationality to another, from one religion to another, from one culture to another, and once and for all in the self-recognition of our ethical value to finally rest in the bosom of the great common Russian Fatherland - as the most valuable conservative element, which within its immeasurable borders has ever existed and still exists today. For what could be more conservative than a Lithuanian Catholic nobleman, with Polish culture?

— Do czego ma dążyć szlachta litewska?, p. 8.

Korwin-Milewski believed at the same time that the growing revolutionary movement was a favourable phenomenon, as it would inevitably face defeat and the revenge of Russian reaction. The Tsar would seek allies among conservative elements, such as the Lithuanian nobility.

== List of publications ==
- Introduction to Katolog der Ausstellung im Künstlerhause. Graflish I. Milewski'sche Sammlung (English: Catalogue of the exhibition in the Künstlerhaus. Count I. Milewski's Collection), Vienna 1895
- Vingt-trois jours dans l'Ocean Glacial et la Mer Blanche. 4éme Croisiére de la Litwa (English: Twenty-three days in the Arctic Ocean and the White Sea. 4th Litwa Cruise), Paris 1898
- Une petite croisière en très haute compagnie (English: A little cruise in very high company), Paris 1899
- Sa Majesté la Reine d'Espagne et son Frère Mgr l'Archiduc Charles-Étienne (English: A little cruise in very high company), Paris 1901
- List otwarty do panów akcyonaryuszów Wileńskiego Ziemskiego Banku (English: Open letter to the excise officers of Vilnius Land Bank), Kraków 1884
- Eine Antwort des Grafen J. Milewski dem Krakauer Einwohner Karol Wlodzimirski als Zuhälter seiner eigenen Frau erteilt (English: An answer given by Count J. Milewski to the Krakow resident Karol Wlodzimirski as a pimp for his own wife), Paris 1904
- Внутренный кризись России и Народное Представительство (English: Russia's internal crisis and People's Representation), Vilnius 1905
- Głos szlachcica o wyborach posła do Rady Państwa (English: The voice of a nobleman on the election of a member of the Council of State), Vilnius 1910, Warsaw 1911 and Sankt Petersburg 1911 in Russian
- Wiązanka odpowiedzi szlachcica tudzież słowo o tem, do czego ma dążyć szlachta litewska (English: A bundle of nobleman's answers and a word about what the Lithuanian nobility should strive for), Warsaw 1910
- Do czego ma dążyć szlachta litewska? (English: What the Lithuanian nobility should strive for?), Warsaw-Vilnius 1911 in Polish and Russian
- Борьба с ложью (English: Fight against lies), Sankt Petersburg 1910 and Sankt Petersburg 1911 in Polish
- O reformie duchowieństwa na Litwie, (English: On the reform of the clergy in Lithuania), Warsaw 1911
- Жажду Справедливости для угнетённого литовского дворянства (English: A thirst for justice for the oppressed Lithuanian nobility), Petersburg 1912
- Ein Separatfrieden mit Russland? (English: A Separation Peace with Russia?) as Polish-Russian magnate Doktor A.-Z., Vienna 1915

== Sources ==
- Cieślińska-Lobkowicz, Nawojka (2019). "The Demise of the World of the Gutnajers: The Warsaw Art Market in World War II" (PDF). Holocaust and Genocide Studies. 33 (3): 333–350. doi:10.1093/hgs/dcz041.
- Ryszkiewicz, Andrzej (1976). "Ignacy Karol Milewski". Polski Słownik Biograficzny (in Polish). Vol. 21. Wrocław. pp. 208–210.
- Ryszkiewicz, Andrzej (1980). "Arcyzbieracz malarstwa polskiego - Ignacy Milewski" [An archcollectioner of Polish paintings - Ignacy Milewski]. Spotkania Z Zabytkami. 3: 68–69.
- Tarkowski, Mikołaj (2016). "Szlachta Kraju Północno-Zachodniego w służbie imperatora rosyjskiego. Rys poświęcony poglądom politycznym hrabiego Ignacego Korwin-Milewskiego" [The nobility of the Northwestern Krai in the service of the Russian Emperor. Drawing devoted to political views of Count Ignacy Korwin-Milewski] (PDF). Studia Iuridica Lublinensia. XXV (3): 923–932.
