= Our Father (cantata) =

Cantata by Leoš Janáček

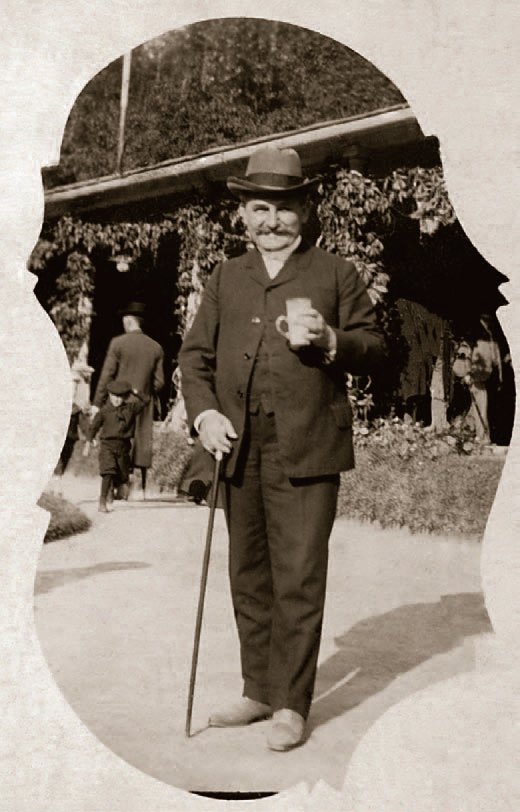
Janáček in 1906, the year he produced the revised version of Our Father

The cantata Our Father (Czech: Otče náš or Otčenáš), originally called Moravian Our Father (Czech: Moravský Otče náš), is a setting of the Lord's Prayer by the Czech composer Leoš Janáček. Its first version (1901) was performed as an accompaniment to a series of tableaux vivants and was scored for mixed chorus, tenor, piano and harmonium; it has never been published. The revised version (1906), for mixed chorus, tenor, harp and organ, lasts about 15 minutes. Our Father met with a mixed reception at first, but it is now a much-recorded work and has been praised as an interesting and successful example of Janáček's ability to combine Christian texts with his own social commitment.

== Structure ==
Our Father falls into five self-contained sections:

- "Our Father, which art in heaven", andante, in A♭ major
- "Thy will be done", moderato, in B♭ minor
- "Give us this day our daily bread", con moto, in E♭ major
- "Forgive us our trespasses", adagio, in A♭ major
- "Lead us not into temptation", energico moderato, in E♭ minor.

== Composition and performance history ==
In the spring of 1901 the governors of an old women's home in Brno were lent reproductions of Our Father, a cycle of paintings by the Polish artist Józef Męcina-Krzesz depicting Russian peasants in situations illustrative of the Lord's Prayer. They decided to stage a series of tableaux vivants based on these paintings to be performed by a local theatre group as a fundraising venture, and they commissioned Janáček to write "musical illustrations" for this entertainment. In May of that year he did so, setting the Lord's Prayer in Czech for mixed voice chorus, tenor, harmonium and/or piano. The piece received its first performance at the National Theatre, Brno on 15 June 1901 under the title Moravský Otče náš (A Moravian Our Father), though Janáček later deleted the word Moravský on the grounds that it described the composer rather than the work.

In 1906 Janáček rescored the work, replacing the piano and harmonium with harp and organ; this revised version was performed in November of that year at the Rudolfinum in Prague by the Czech Orchestral Music Society. The conductor at this performance was Adolf Piskáček, though Janáček had to take the last rehearsals, Piskáček being prevented by pressure of work. The work got mixed reviews and Janáček declared himself depressed by the performance, regretting the absence of the original tableaux vivants. In October 1924 Our Father and three others of his cantatas were performed in an ill-attended concert in Brno by the Beseda Philharmonic Society as part of the public celebrations of Janáček's 70th birthday.

== Criticism ==
Though Our Father was not particularly well received in Janáček's lifetime it has been given more praise since his death. The critic John Quinn noted that the scoring for organ and harp "is surprisingly atmospheric and the instruments complement each other beautifully...This is a most interesting work". Jaroslav Vogel called it "this too seldom performed work", and believed that it "reveals the meditative qualities of its creator and his ability to merge into one the Christian prayer and his own social and humanitarian feelings". He referred to the "almost revolutionary conception" of the third section, with its "almost threateningly insistent ostinato figure to the pressing cries 'bread, bread'". Bohumír Štědroň agreed that Janáček's setting emphasised the human as opposed to the ideal conception of the Lord's Prayer:

Here, once more, we have proof of his realistic understanding of life. Christianity was for him an offensive in the fight for existence. So much so, that one might almost call it socialism. Man has the right to exist and Janáček demanded that this right be respected.

The possibility of a Czech nationalist overtone to Janáček's setting of the words "Thy kingdom come" has also been noted.
