= Evidenzbureau =

Directorate of military intelligence of the Austro-Hungarian Empire

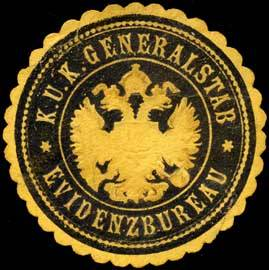
Evidenzbureau seal

The k.u.k. Evidenzbureau (lit. "Imperial and Royal Evidence Bureau") was the common military intelligence service of the Austro-Hungarian Empire.

It was subordinated to the Chief of the General Staff under the common Imperial and Royal Ministry of War. It was headquartered in Vienna, Cisleithania (empire's Austrian half).

== Foundation ==
Founded in 1850 as the first permanent military intelligence service in the world, the Evidenzbureau became active in the 1859 Austro-Sardinian War and the 1866 Austro-Prussian War, albeit with little success.

The Evidenzbureau initially reported to the Austro-Hungarian Foreign Ministry, but was reassigned to the General Staff at the outbreak of World War I. It existed until the end of the monarchy in 1918.

The Kundschaftsbüro, tasked with monitoring foreign states, was subordinate to the Evidenzbureau.

== Functions ==
Towards the end of the 19th century, tensions among the major European powers were rising, leading to increased activities of intelligence services. Mirroring political interests, attention of Austro-Hungarian services was primarily directed east- and southward (Russia and the Balkans); conversely, Russia was chiefly interested in affairs of Austria-Hungary and the German Reich.

The bureau collected intelligence of military relevance from various sources into daily reports to the Chief of Staff (Generalstabschef) and weekly reports to Emperor Franz Joseph; until 1913, the reports to the Emperor had to be submitted in longhand.

The core Bureau at the time consisted of 20 officers, a fraction of the numbers employed in the German or Russian services. This shortage was primarily because the service was part of the Foreign Ministry, which, as an Imperial institution, customarily received only the minimum acceptable amount of financing from the Hungarian side (see also Ausgleich).

== History ==
In 1903, the agencies of the Russian Empire succeeded in enlisting Colonel Alfred Redl, a General Staff officer and later head of counterintelligence and deputy director (1908-1912) of the Evidenzbureau, as a double agent. His unmasking in May 1913 led to a severe political and military crisis in Austria on the eve of World War I.

During that war, the Bureau increased in importance; the relatively new task of intercepting radio transmissions was added to its traditional functions (such as mail censorship).

In the last year of the war (1918), the Evidenzbureau – then led by Colonel Maximilian Ronge – along with the domestic intelligence service (Staatspolizei) allegedly employed 300 officers, 50 officials, 400 police agents, 600 soldiers and 600 informants.

== Directors ==
- Maj. Anton Ritter von Kalik, 1850–64
- Col. Georg Ritter von Kees, 1864–66
- Col. Josef Pelikan von Plauenwald, 1866–69
- Lt.Col. Franz Weikhard, 1869–70
- Col. Ludwig Edler von Cornaro, 1870–71
- Col. Rudolf Ritter von Hoffingen, 1871–76
- Col. Adolf Ritter von Leddihn, 1876–79
- Col. Karl Freiherr von Ripp, 1879–82
- Col. Hugo Ritter Bilimek von Waissolm, 1882–86
- Col. Edmund Ritter Mayer von Wallerstein und Marnegg, 1886–92
- Lt.Col. Emil Freiherr Woinovich von Belobreska, 1892–96
- Lt.Col. Desiderius Kolossváry de Kolozsvár, 1896–98
- Col. Arthur Freiherr Giesl von Gieslingen, 1898–1903
- Col. Eugen Hordliczka, 1903–09
- Col. August Urbanski von Ostrymiecz, 1909–14
- Col. Oskar Hranilović von Czvetassin, 1914–17
- Col. Maximilian Ronge, 1917–18

Notable officers

- Col. Alfred Redl, deputy director of the service 1908–1912
- Włodzimierz Zagórski

== In fiction ==
The fictional biography of Rex Stout's detective Nero Wolfe includes a reference to Wolfe - originally a Montenegrin - having acted as an agent of the Evidenzbureau in the years of increasing Balkan tensions leading to the outbreak of World War I.

== See also ==
- Heeresnachrichtenamt
