= Maximilian Ronge =

Austro-Hungarian army officer

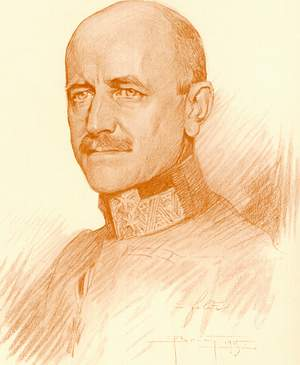
Colonel Maximilian Ronge

Colonel Maximilian Ronge (November 9, 1874 – September 10, 1953) was the last director of the Evidenzbureau, the directorate of military intelligence of the Austro-Hungarian Empire. Ronge played a key role in the 1913 exposure of Col. Alfred Redl as a double agent.

== Life ==
Ronge was born in Vienna, Austria, in 1874. He was a career officer in the Austro-Hungarian army; one of his classmates in officer training was Theodor Körner, later a notable Social Democrat and personal adversary of Ronge, who was to become President of the Second Austrian Republic in 1951.

In 1907, Ronge was transferred to the Evidenzbureau, the directorate of military intelligence, where he became a student and protégé of Col. Redl. There, in 1913, Ronge directed the investigations following the discovery of an unclaimed letter containing a large sum of money, which eventually led to the exposure of Redl as a Russian double agent and Redl's subsequent suicide.

Ronge was promoted to Colonel and head of the Evidenzbureau in 1917, a position he held until the end of the monarchy brought about the dissolution of the Bureau in 1918.

In the First Austrian Republic, Ronge was deputy director of the government office for Prisoners of War and Civilian Internees in Vienna. At the same time, he was a member of a secret society preparing to overthrow the social-democratic Republic.

Ronge retired in 1932, but was recalled to duty in the following year as director of the staatspolizeiliches Sonderbüro ("state police special bureau"). In 1934, Ronge was posted to the Bundeskanzleramt ("chancellery") in the Dollfuss regime; his counter-espionage staff was however unable to prevent the assassination of Dollfuss by Nazi agents in the same year.

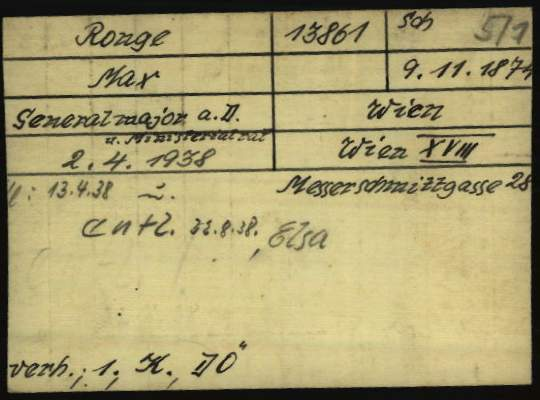
Registration card of Maximilian Ronge as a prisoner at Dachau Nazi Concentration Camp

When Ronge refused to join the SS after Austria's Anschluss to the German Reich in 1938, he was arrested and deported to the Dachau concentration camp. From prison, Ronge wrote a “declaration of loyalty“ to Wilhelm Canaris when the latter was promoted to vice admiral, upon which he was released in August 1938.

During World War II, Ronge lived in Vienna. After the war, aged 71, he supported the American troops in allied-administered Austria in the creation of a new intelligence service, but died in 1953 before the Heeresnachrichtenamt ("Army Intelligence Office") was formally established in 1955, the year Austria regained its independence.

He appears in Dennis Wheatley's 1950 historical novel The Second Seal, which deals with the run-up to war in 1914 and the first few months of the war. As chief of Austrian Intelligence, he is the main antagonist and foil of the British agent, the Duke de Richleau, who visits Austria-Hungary several times in various guises. They conduct a running battle of wits throughout the story.

== See also ==
- Ronge, Maximilian (1930). Kriegs- und Industrie-Spionage: Zwölf Jahre Kundschaftsdienst [Wartime Espionage and Industrial Espionage: Twelve Years in the Intelligence Service] (in German). Vienna, Austria: Amalthea-Verlag.
- Schindler, John R. (2000). "A hopeless struggle: Austro-Hungarian cryptology during World War I". Cryptologia. 24 (4): 339–350. doi:10.1080/01611190008984251.
- MAX RONGE - SPIONAJ SI CONTRASPIONAJ,1955
- Germany's First Cryptanalysis on the Western Front: Decrypting British and French Naval Ciphers in World War I
- The Undermining of Austria-Hungary: The Battle for Hearts and Minds (Hardcover)
- Général Max Ronge, dernier chef du service des renseignements au Grand quartier général et à l'État-major général des armées austro-hongroises. Espionnage, douze années au service des renseignements. Édition française, par Adrien F. Rochelle (Reliure inconnue)
