= Alfred Redl =

Austro-Hungarian army officer (1864–1913)

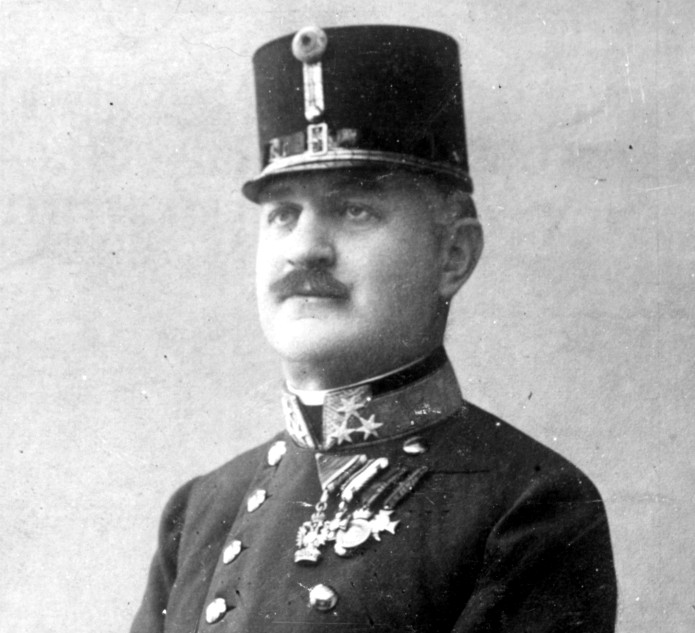
- Born: 14 March 1864; Lemberg, Galicia, Austrian Empire
- Died: 25 May 1913 (aged 49); Vienna, Austro-Hungarian Empire
- Military career
- Allegiance: Austria-Hungary/Russian Empire
- Branch: Austro-Hungarian Army
- Rank: Colonel
- Commands: Evidenzbureau

Alfred Redl (14 March 1864 – 25 May 1913) was an Austro-Hungarian military officer who rose to head the Evidenzbureau, the counterintelligence wing of the General Staff of the Austro-Hungarian Army. He was one of the leading figures of pre-World War I espionage; his term in office was marked by radical innovations and the use of advanced technology to ensnare foreign spies.

Due to the innovations he introduced, Redl's successor, Major Maximilian Ronge, ultimately learned in 1913 that Redl himself was also a highly paid spy, working for the intelligence service of the Imperial Russian Army. Upon being exposed as a Russian spy, Redl committed suicide.

Redl's homosexuality was publicized during the investigation, and it has been debated whether his sexuality or the money he received was related to his decision to spy. He may have been enticed by the material benefits. Redl's revelations did not have a significant effect on the course of the war, although the changes by Field Marshal Franz Conrad to the attack in August 1914 from eastern to western Galicia did have serious consequences, according to Prit Buttar and Hannes Leidinger.

== Early career ==
Alfred Redl was born on 14 March 1864 in the city Lemberg, located in the Austrian Empire (now the Ukrainian city of Lviv). He came from a relatively poor family, his father was a railway clerk.

At the age of fifteen Redl entered the Karthaus Military Academy in Brno, as a cadet. In 1883 he graduated as a cadet officer, rated as having had a very good record. He then served with the Infantry Regiment No. 9 stationed in Lemberg reaching the rank of lieutenant.

Despite lacking the advantages of wealth or family connections, Redl rose quickly within the officer ranks of the Austro-Hungarian Army. He attended the War School in Vienna, which normally accepted only fifty entrants a year from about a thousand applicants. Acquiring a specialist interest in Russian military issues, Redl joined the Intelligence Bureau of the Austro-Hungarian General Staff, and was assigned to the Russian Section in 1900.

== Counter-intelligence work ==
By 1907, Redl had become head of the counter-intelligence branch of the Intelligence Bureau. Promoted to the rank of colonel, he greatly improved the methods used by the Austro-Hungarian counter-intelligence service, introducing such technological innovations as the use of cameras and primitive recording devices, while creating a database of fingerprint records for persons of interest. However, at the same time, Redl himself became a spy for Russia and his subsequent exposure was largely due to the improvements he had developed himself.

== Treason ==
Redl's motives for treason are still unclear. He may have been caught in a compromising position by Russian agents, because he was homosexual and being exposed as such would have been fatal to his career prospects. In fact, Colonel Nikolai Batyushin of Russian military intelligence, based in Warsaw (Congress Poland) at the time, had discovered Redl's homosexuality as early as 1901, information that was used to blackmail him into revealing classified information. However it has been claimed that recent results from Russian archives do not support this.

In 1902, Redl reportedly passed a copy of Austro-Hungarian war plans to the Russians. General von Gieslingen, head of the Intelligence Bureau, delegated Redl himself to investigate the source of this leak. In consultation with his Russian contacts, Redl identified several low-level agents as Russian spies, thereby protecting himself and enhancing his reputation for efficiency.

Redl was paid well by the Russian government for his services, and acquired a lifestyle far beyond what his official salary could cover, explained by references to family/inheritance. He owned several expensive automobiles, several apartments in Vienna and a house in Prague. It would appear that there was also a strong element of vanity involved, as well as a taste for danger. A Russian report of 1907 describes Redl as "more sly and false than intelligent and talented", a cynic "who enjoys dissipation". Buttar writes: "It is estimated that the Russians alone paid Redl the equivalent of £2.4 million ($3.8 million) in today’s (2014) currencies, with additional funds from the French and Italians."

From 1903 to 1913, Redl was Russia's leading spy. Before World War I, he provided the Russians with information of Plan III, the entire Austro-Hungarian invasion plan for Serbia. The Russians then informed the Serbian military command about Plan III. As a result, when the Austro-Hungarian Army invaded Serbia, the Serbians were well prepared. Redl not only provided many of his country's military secrets and plans, but he also supplied incorrect estimates of Russian military strength to his own military authorities.

Redl is thought to have sold to Russia one of Austria-Hungary's principal attack plans, along with its order of battle, its mobilization plans (at a time when mobilization was viewed as one of the critical keys to victory) and detailed plans of Austrian fortifications that were soon overrun by Russia. He is known beyond question to have sent Austro-Hungarian agents into Russia only to sell them out to protect himself. He also had Austro-Hungarian agents within the Russian Imperial Staff but betrayed them too, to be hanged or to commit suicide. He is also believed to have informed on various Russian officers who contacted Austro-Hungarian intelligence.

== Exposure ==
In 1912, Redl became chief of staff of the VIII Corps under his old commander, Arthur Giesl von Gieslingen. When he left the counter-intelligence service, Redl was succeeded by Major Maximilian Ronge, a man trained by Redl himself. Ronge instigated the practice of checking suspicious mail. One suspect envelope – a poste restante was discovered. It contained a significant amount of money and included references to several addresses known to be used for espionage activities.

On 9 May 1913, a duplicate letter with money was posted to the same cover name, "Nikon Nizetas". Police detectives were assigned to monitor the post office and follow whoever claimed it. When the letter was finally claimed on 24 May, police pursued, but lost contact when the person who had picked up the letter left in a taxi. But while the detectives stood wondering what to do, the taxi that the suspect had taken returned. The detectives took the taxi and asked to be driven to the address that the previous customer had been taken to, which turned out to be the Hotel Klomser. During the ride there, they found a pen-knife sheath. Arriving at the hotel, the detectives told the management to ask the guests if any of them had lost the sheath and then waited in the lobby. When a guest arrived to claim it, the detectives recognized their former boss, Colonel Alfred Redl.

Redl was subsequently confronted in his apartment by a party of military officers. In the course of a brief interrogation he admitted selling military intelligence to a foreign power. Field Marshal Franz Conrad von Hötzendorf, the army's Chief of Staff, ordered that Redl was to be left alone with a loaded revolver. Redl shot himself in the early morning of 25 May 1913.

== Legacy ==
Redl's death was regretted both by Emperor Franz Josef, who would have preferred that the colonel avoided dying in mortal sin, and by the intelligence service, which would have preferred to interrogate him on the full extent of his disclosures to the Russians. In the political post-mortem one newspaper noted that "the Redl affair cannot be seen as a private matter. Redl is not an individual but a system. Whilst soldiers elsewhere are taught to love their homelands, lack of patriotism is held to be the greatest military virtue in this unfortunate monarchy. With us military education culminates in all national feeling being driven out of our soldiers ... In the Redl affair this spirit has had its revenge. The Austrian and the Hungarian soldiers possess no fatherland; they only have a war lord."

In 1950, U.S. Senator Joseph McCarthy brought up the case of Alfred Redl in an influential speech at the outset of the Lavender Scare, in which gay employees of the State Department were fired. McCarthy believed the Redl case illustrated that "the pervert is easy prey to the blackmailer", and that therefore homosexuals should be banned from working for the State Department. He claimed that "We're not disturbed about them because of their morals, but because they are dangerous to this country."

== In popular culture ==
- Historian Robert B. Asprey wrote The Panther's Feast about Redl.
- John Osborne's 1965 play A Patriot for Me is based on Redl's story.
- A summary of Redl's career and its effect on the course of World War I is provided by Dennis Wheatley in his historical novel The Second Seal (1950). Redl's successor, Ronge, also appears as himself – chief of Austro-Hungarian Intelligence. He is trying to foil the attempts of British Intelligence to find out what Austria intends for Serbia in 1914.

The discovery of Redl’s treason and his subsequent suicide are mentioned towards the end of The Strangler’s Waltz (2013). After the novel’s two star detectives believe they’ve cracked the case, having found the serial killer, Vienna’s frantic yellow press papers turn their focus to the Redl scandal to feed their readers’ appetite for sensationalist stories.

- The sixth chapter of the video game Reverse: 1999 mentions the Alfred Redl scandal

=== Films ===
- Colonel Redl (dir. Hans Otto, 1925)
- The Affair of Colonel Redl (dir. Karl Anton, 1931)
- Espionage (dir. Franz Antel, 1955)
- Colonel Redl (dir. István Szabó, 1985)
