= Emil Vojnović =

Baron Emil Vojnović
- Born: 23 April 1851; Petrinja, Military Frontier, Austrian Empire (now Croatia)
- Died: 13 February 1927 (aged 75); Vienna, Austria
- Military career
- Allegiance: Austria-Hungary
- Branch: Austro-Hungarian Army
- Rank: General der Infanterie

Emil Vojnović von Belobreska (also Emil Woinovich; 23 April 1851 – 13 February 1927) was an Austro-Hungarian Army general and historian from the Military Frontier who until 1915 was the director of the War Archives in Vienna. He also authored 11 books, mainly on war history. A street in Vienna is named after him.

== Early life and military career ==
Vojnović was born in Petrinja, then part of the Slavonian Military Frontier, 23 April 1851. He attended the Theresian Military Academy in Wiener Neustadt from 1866 to 1870. He attended the k.u.k. War College from 1873 to 1875. From 1892 to 1896 he was the head of the Evidenzbureau. Vojnović was promoted to Feldmarschall-Leutnant in 1903 and General der Infanterie in 1908.

Vojnović was given the title of von Belobreska in the Hungarian-Croatian nobility in 1908 and was subsequently also given the title of Freiherr in the Austrian nobility in 1916. He was a member of the Imperial Academy of Science in Vienna.

Vojnović is buried in Vienna's Zentralfriedhof.

== Works ==
- Battles in Lika, Croatia and Dalmatia (Kämpfe in der Lika, in Kroatien und Dalmatien), 1906
- Battles in Southern France 1815 (Kämpfe im Süden Frankreichs 1814), 1912

== Awards ==
- Order of the Iron Crown III. Class, 1896
- Order of Leopold, 1906
- Order of Franz Joseph, 1908
