= Włodzimierz Zagórski (general) =

Polish general and aviator

- Włodzimierz Zagórski of Ostoja
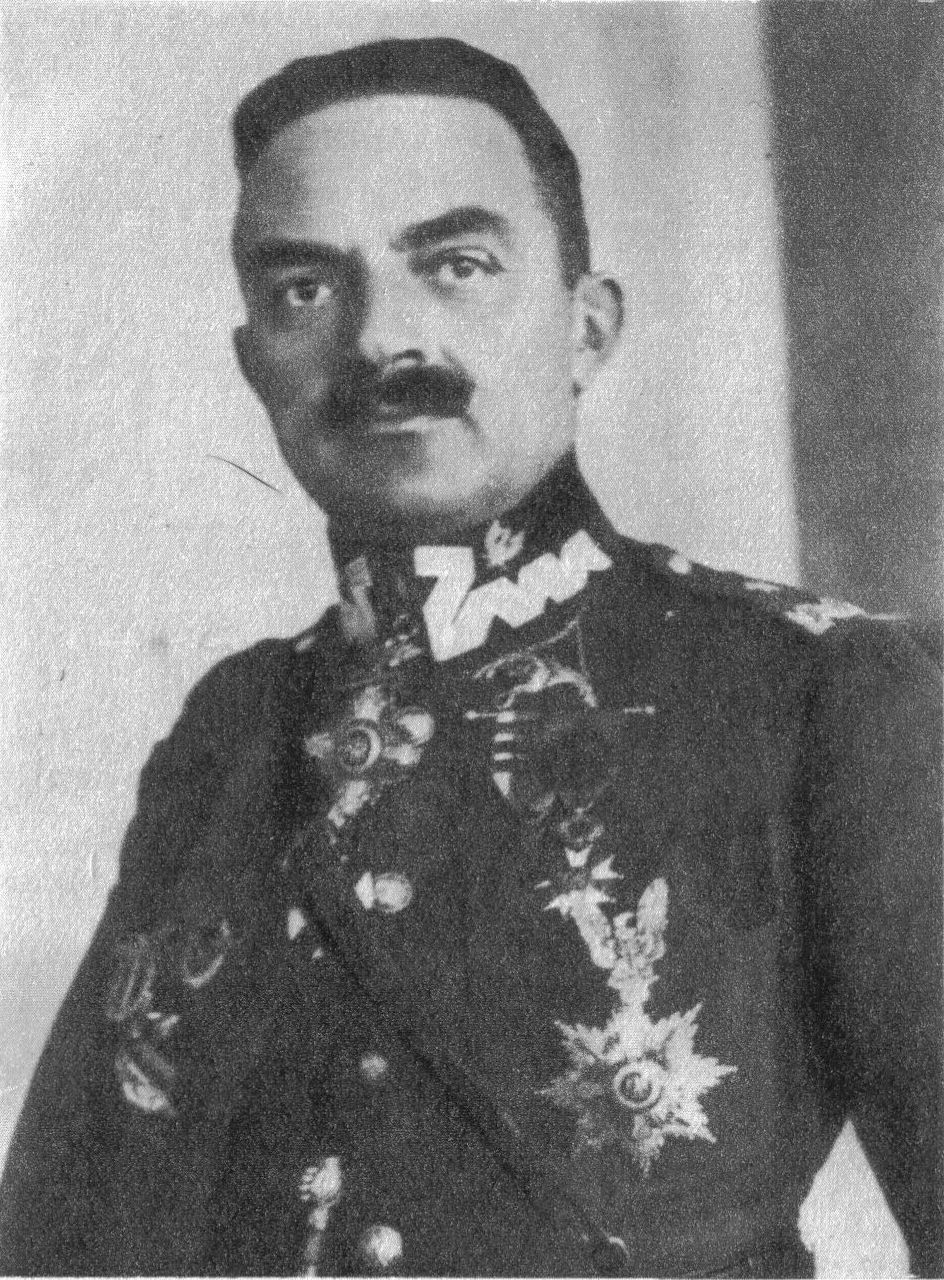
- Born: January 21, 1882; Saint-Martin-Lantosque, France
- Disappeared: August 6, 1927 (aged 45)
- Military career
- Relatives: Clan of Ostoja
- Allegiance: Austro-Hungarian Army; Polish Army
- Branch: Evidenzbureau; Polish Legions; Air Force of Polish Army
- Service years: 1900–1927
- Rank: Brigadier General
- Conflicts: World War I; Polish-Soviet War; May Coup of 1926
- Awards: Cross of Valour; Order of the Star of Romania

Ostoja Coat of Arms

Włodzimierz Zagórski of the Clan of Ostoja (January 21, 1882 – disappeared August 6, 1927) was a Polish brigadier general, military intelligence soldier of the Austro-Hungarian Army, staff officer and aviator.

== Youth ==
Włodzimierz Zagórski was born in Saint-Martin-Lantosque, France, near the city of Nice. He was born into nobility, specifically the Clan of Ostoja. His father was Jan Zagórski, one of many representatives of the noble Zagórski family living throughout Masovia, Warsaw, Lubelszczyzna, Lublin, and Kraków. Jan Zagórski was an active member of the January Uprising in 1863–1864, who as a result of his participation in the Uprising, was deported to Siberia only to escape and flee afterwards to France. Włodzimierz Zagórski's mother was Anna Kozłow, a dame of the House of Romanov and daughter of General Kozlov. Włodziemierz Zagórski experienced extensive schooling in many various subjects while living in France. He graduated both legal and trade schools in France and Austria. He spoke fluently six languages, including French and German, and financed his own aviation training when the industry was just being popularized.

== Military service in the Austro-Hungarian Army and the Polish Legions during World War I ==
Zagórski began his military service in 1900 in the Austro-Hungarian Army. On August 18, 1902, he was promoted to Second Lieutenant of Artillery. In 1910, he graduated from the General Staff Academy in Vienna and was promoted to Chief of Staff of the 8th Infantry Brigade of the Austro-Hungarian Army in Kraków. In 1911, he was transferred to the (Evidenzbureau) of the Austro-Hungarian Army, where he was responsible for leading irregular warfare in the Vistula Land, aimed at destabilizing said region of the Russian Empire. Zagórski was appointed as an official in the Second Branch of the General Staff in Vienna, where he commanded the so-called Hauptkundschaftstellen in Kraków, Przemyśl, and Lwów.

The Hauptkundschaftstellen was the governing body of the Evidenzbureau which commanded Austrian-sponsored Polish paramilitary and intelligence-gathering organizations in the Vistula Land. One of the commanders of such organizations Zagórski came into contact with was Józef Piłsudski. Piłsudski would gather and transfer intelligence over to Zagórski in exchange for Austrian funds which helped establish and expand Polish paramilitary capabilities in the Vistula Land - one such example being the Riflemen's Association.

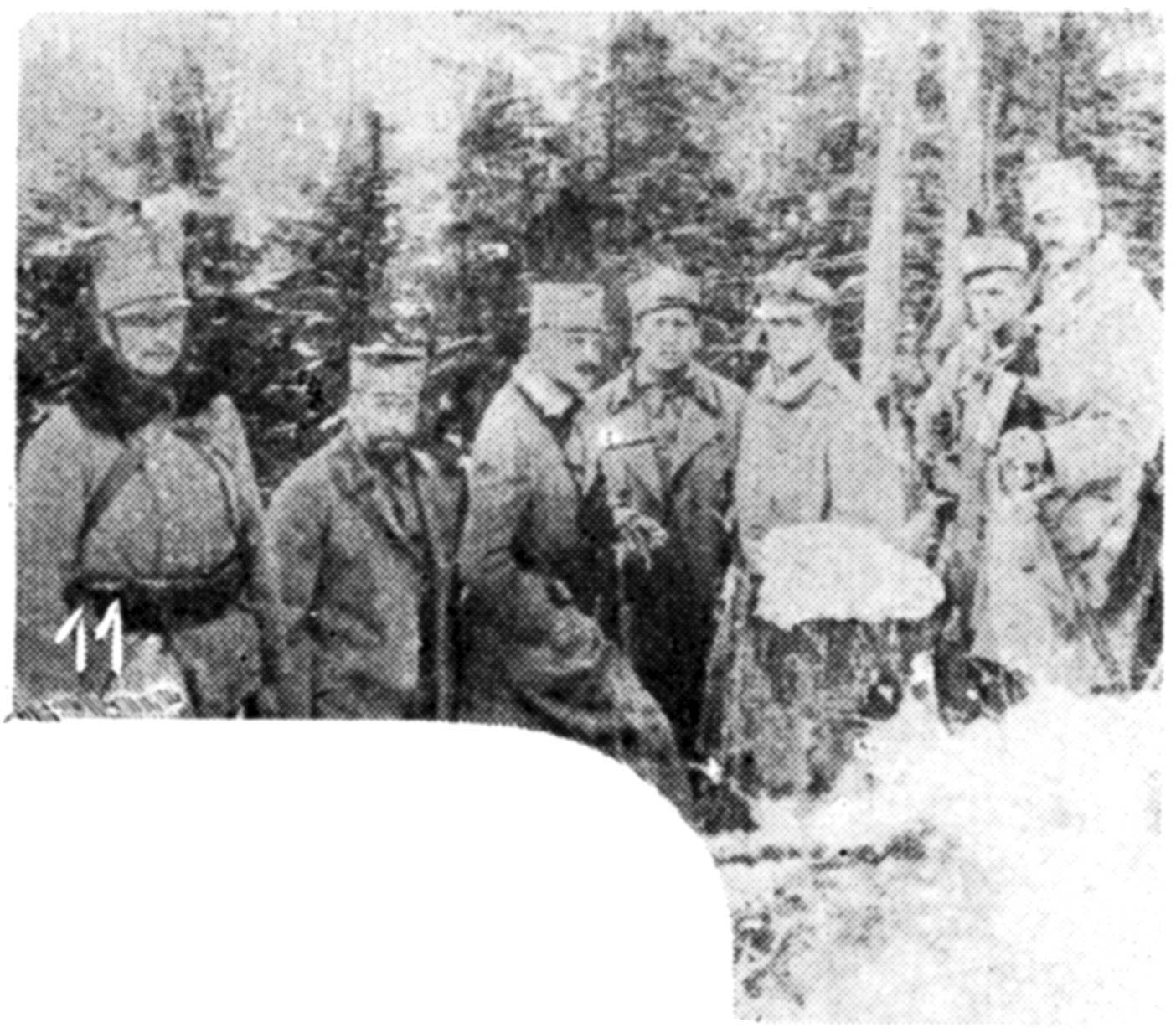
Zagórski as Chief of Staff with his officers, 1914

During the first two years of World War I, Zagórski was promoted to captain and appointed Chief of Staff of the Polish Legions. Józef Piłsudski opposed Zagórski's appointment as Chief of Staff, as Piłsudski was interested in re-constructing an independent Poland while Zagórski proved stubbornly loyal to Emperor Franz Joseph I. The Austrian Emperor would have opposed the breakaway of Polish-populated Austrian territories. As a result, Zagórski proved terribly difficult to work with, having created enemies with Piłsudski, Władysław Sikorski, and even members of the Austrian Army's High Command due to his extreme loyalty towards the Austrian Emperor.

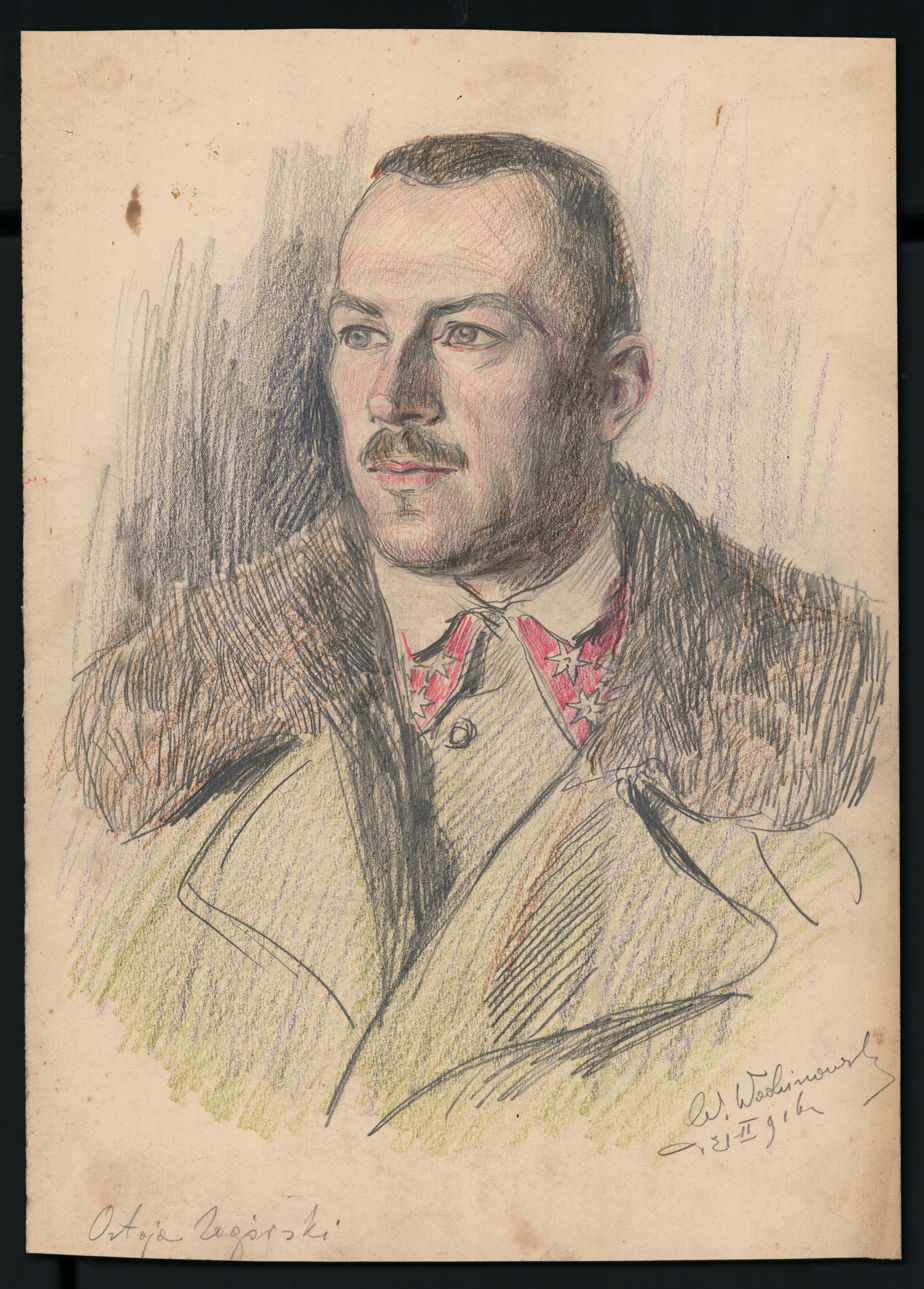
Zagorski in the Polish Legion, by Wincenty Wodzinowski

From June 1916 to July 1917, Zagórski served as commander of the 3rd Infantry Regiment of the Polish Legions. The Oath Crisis took place during this time period, where Zagórski pledged his allegiance to the Central Powers, in contrast to the vast majority of his soldiers who did not. He imprisoned several of his soldiers and ordered for them not to be fed. When none of the prisoners complied with Zagórski's demand to pledge allegiance to the Central Powers, he ordered the soldiers to march shoe-less to an internment camp in Szczypiorno. Later, it was often recalled by the Polish Legions that as the column of shoe-less Poles marched past a furious Zagórski, the Polish soldiers bellowed out in unison the lyrics to "We Are the First Brigade", and added a fifth verse to the song where they verbally attacked Zagórski, ending the song with telling Zagórski to "go f--- yourself". As a result, Zagórski denounced several Polish Legion officers at the internment camp who entered undercover as regular soldiers with the aim of dividing the sentences among the imprisoned. Those denounced by Zagórski were transferred to another internment camp in Havelberg, where they were brutally treated, and even tortured.

From July 1917 to February 1918, Zagórski served as the commander of the 1st Light Artillery Regiment of the Polish Auxiliary Corps. After the successful break-through of the II Brigade at the Battle of Rarańcza, Zagórski was removed from the Polish Legions for plotting against the Austrian Army. He was interned at Khust, and later court-martialed. His sentence was quickly nullified due to the dissolution of the Austro-Hungarian Empire. Despite having served in the Polish Legions, many within the Legions denounced Zagórski for his loyalty towards the Habsburg Emperors instead of his fellow Polish countrymen.

== Service in the Polish Armed Forces ==
During the formation of the Polish Armed Forces in late October 1918, Zagórski was appointed Vice-Chief of the Polish Army's General Staff. However, on November 10 - only three weeks later - he was forced to resign. He was recalled to the Army at the start of Polish-Soviet border conflicts which soon erupted into the Polish-Bolshevik War. During the war, he was Chief of Staff of the Polish Northern Front, which was then led by General Józef Haller. He participated in the Battle of Warsaw.

From September 25, 1920, to November 23, 1920, he served as fill-in commander of the 4th Infantry Division, and was then assigned full command of the division until April 1921. On April 9, 1921, Zagórski asked of his own accord to be transferred to the Polish Army Reserves. From April 1921 to March 1923, Zagórski was enlisted in the reserves, and spent most of his time working for Francopol - a company which purchased and imported French-made aeroplanes for the Polish Army.

In March 1923, the Minister to Military Affairs, General Kazimierz Sosnkowski, called Zagórski up from the reserves and appointed him Chief of the Military Production Department to the Army. On November 1, 1923, he was promoted to colonel in the Staff of Generals. On March 31, 1924, he was promoted by President Stanisław Wojciechowski to Brigade General.

== Francopol Affair ==
From 17 August 1924 until 18 March 1926 he served as Chief of the Air Force Department in the War Ministry. An important figure in the development of the Polish air force, he attempted during this time period to implement a controversial armament program for the air force created by François-Lèon Leveque, a French officer who commanded the Polish Army's air force up until December 1922. The program called for the import of French-made aircraft to arm nearly 50 squadrons. Large amounts of credit were loaned by the French in exchange for purchase of French aircraft for the Polish air force. The rapid enforcing of the program by Zagórski resulted in the purchase of a large number of French aircraft through the Francopol company. By 1925, in terms of the number of aircraft, the Poles were considered a European aerial powerhouse. On the other hand, the quick purchase of such a vast number of aircraft overshadowed the fact that Poland lacked trained pilots to fly the newly purchased aircraft, lacked the proper facilities to base the aircraft in, and lacked properly trained technicians to service the aircraft. As a result, although Poland had a threatening force on paper, squadrons of airplanes rusted away, and along with it Poland's aerial potential. Additionally, despite having acquired reliable and superior aircraft such as the Breguet XIX or Potez XXV, Poland also purchased aircraft considered to be outdated, inferior, and marred with poor service and safety records, such as the SPAD S.61 or Farman F.68 Goliath.

From January 1926, Zagórski came under attack from Piłsudskiites in the government and military – including generals Daniel Konarzewski and Lucjan Żeligowski, for having mismanaged the formation of the Polish air force through the participation of corrupt elements. Specifically, Zagórski was attacked for the role of Francopol and French capital in the formation of the air force. Additionally, the argument was made that the native Polish aircraft industry has suffered drastically as a result of the purchase of French-made airplanes instead. On March 18, 1926, General Żeligowski fired Zagórski from his position as Chief of the Air Force in the War Ministry. Zagórski was heavily criticized by public media. He had been a shareholder in Francopol since 1921, yet all the purchases for the air force through Francopol - including the purchase of 100 aircraft engines and 100 Spad S.61 aircraft, was supervised and approved by the General Prosecutor of the National Treasury.

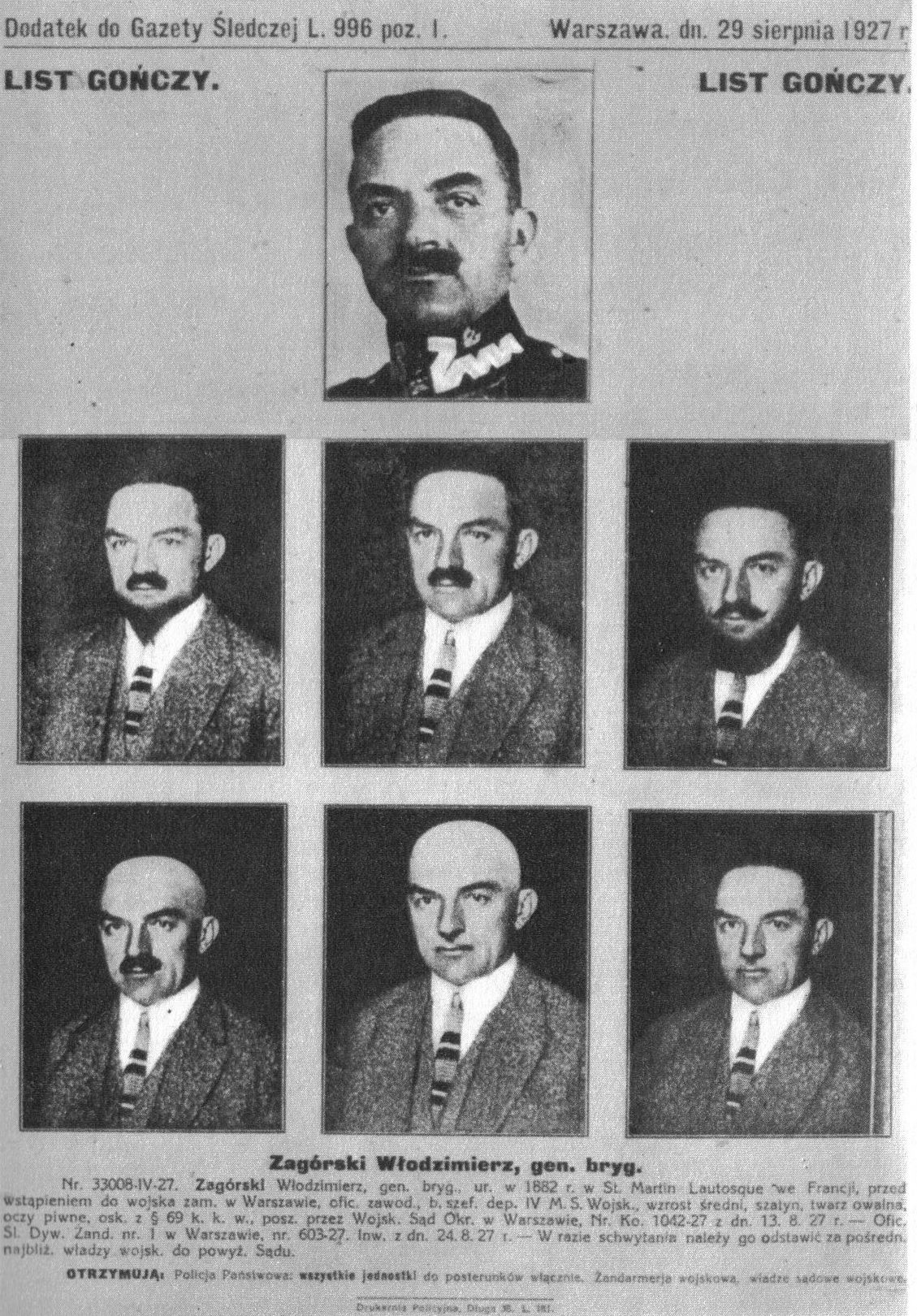
A wanted poster issued after Zagórski's disappearance. He was accused of desertion from the Polish Army.

== May Coup of 1926 and imprisonment ==
During the May 1926 coup d'état, Piłsudskiite forces attacked the legal government of Prime Minister Wincenty Witos. Loyal to the Witos Government, General Tadeusz Jordan-Rozwadowski ordered Zagórski on May 12 to take command of the Warsaw Air Group from Ludomił Rayski and to initiate bombing of pro-Piłsudski forces. Zagórski was arrested in Warsaw on May 15, 1926, along with four other generals who had supported the legal government, including his superior General Rozwadowski. The five prisoners-of-war were imprisoned in Wilno. Zagórski was accused to have had allegedly flown missions and personally bombed Piłsudski's force despite there being no evidence for these accusations. In October 1926, the five prisoners were cleared of all charges and approved for release, yet the army prosecutor lengthened their arrests instead, citing the prisoners to be threats to the interests of the Polish Army. A new round of charges were created against Zagórski and his role in the Francopol Affair, although they were never brought up against him.

== Release and disappearance ==
Marian Zdziechowski, a prominent Piłsudskiite and professor at the Wilno University, publicly criticized the government's acceptance of lengthening the imprisonment period of the five prisoners. Zdziechowski's criticism had greatly influenced other Poles, and even members of Piłsudski's own circle, which in turn forced the government to release the prisoners due to public pressure. The five prisoners, including Zagórski, were finally released from prison on August 6, 1927.

On August 6, 1927, on the anniversary of the march of the 1st Cadre Company, celebrated by the legionnaires at a meeting in Szczypiorno, he was picked up from prison by Marshal Piłsudski's adjutant, Captain Lucjan Miładowski. That morning at 8:20, in civilian clothes provided to him, accompanied by Captain Lucjan Miładowski, he left Vilnius for Warsaw on passenger train no. 714. In the capital, he was to report to Marshal of Poland Józef Piłsudski. However, he was in Kalisz at the time. Zagórski was given a lift to Flory Street, to his family, but as he was passing by on Krakowskie Przedmieście, he said he would like to get off and go to the baths. All trace of him ends in the vicinity of the Fajans baths. Press speculation abounded as to his disappearance, but in the end he was never seen again, nor his body ever found. Media at the time speculated that the former intelligence officer disappeared fearing another trial regarding the Francopol Affair; some historians allege that Zagórski was murdered on the orders of Józef Piłsudski, yet there is no evidence to support such a thesis. To date, the whereabouts and fate of General Zagórski are unknown, and the sole charges that were brought up against him after his disappearance were for desertion from the Polish Army.

== See also ==
- List of people who disappeared mysteriously (pre-1910)

== Books ==
- "Zagórski Włodzimierz". Internetowa encyklopedia PWN (in Polish).
- "Zagórski Włodzimierz". WIEM Encyclopedia (in Polish).
