= Arthur Giesl von Gieslingen =

Austro-Hungarian army general (1857-1935)

General der Kavallerie Arthur Giesl von Gieslingen
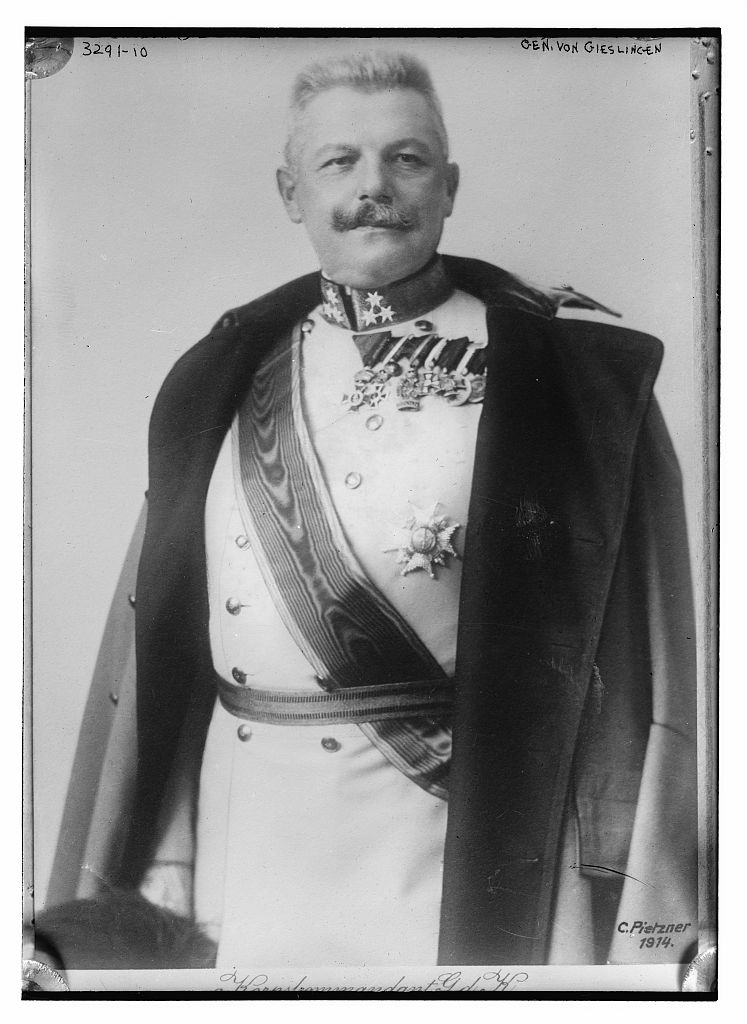
- Arthur Giesl von Gieslingen c. between 1910 and 1915
- Born: 19 June 1857; Kraków, Grand Duchy of Kraków
- Died: 3 December 1935 (aged 78); Vienna, Austria
- Relatives: Heinrich Karl Giesl von Gieslingen (father); Wladimir Giesl von Gieslingen (brother)
- Military career
- Allegiance: Austria
- Rank: General der Kavallerie
- Unit: 29th Infantry Division
- Commands: Theresian Military Academy
- Conflicts: World War I

Arthur Freiherr Giesl von Gieslingen (19 June 1857 – 3 December 1935) was an Austrian general officer during the First World War.

== Biography ==
Arthur Giesl von Gieslingen was born in Kraków in 1857, as the son of general Heinrich Karl Giesl von Gieslingen. He was the elder brother of Wladimir Giesl von Gieslingen.

After having been educated at the Theresian Military Academy, Giesl von Gieslingen was posted to a regiment of dragoons in 1875. Between 1877-1887 Giesl von Gieslingen worked for the Austrian military intelligence, the Evidenzbureau. In 1887 he became orderly officer to Crown Prince Rudolf. In the Mayerling incident, he was one of the few to see the dead bodies of the Archduke and his mistress Mary Vetsera. In 1891 he became adjudant to Emperor Franz Joseph I of Austria.

In 1898 Giesl von Gieslingen became head of the Evidenzbureau (1898-1903). In 1903 he became commander of a brigade of infantry and he was promoted to major-general. In 1905 he became commandant of the Theresian Military Academy. In 1907 he was promoted to Feldmarschall-Leutnant. In 1910 he was given command of the 29th infantry division in Theresienstadt.

In 1912 Giesl von Gieslingen became commander of the VIII Corps in Prague, where he had as chief of staff an old collaborator of his Evidenzbureau days, Colonel Alfred Redl, who in 1913 was unmasked as a Russian spy. In fact Giesl had in 1902 tasked Redl in finding the leak (Redl himself) of a copy of the Austro-Hungarian war plans which had turned up in Russian hands. Redl is thought to have leaked the entire Austrian war plans and mobilization schemes, as well as the names of Austrian spies in Russia to the Russian secret service, possibly severely hampering the later Austrian war effort.

On the outbreak of the First World War, Giesl's VIII Corps was posted at the Serbian front. After setbacks against the Serbs Giesl von Gieslingen was retired to the reserve in the rank of general der kavallerie. Recalled to active duty in 1917, he was assigned to the staff of the commander of replacement services until war's end. He died in 1935 in Vienna.
