= Indian Summer (painting) =

1875 painting by Józef Marian Chełmoński

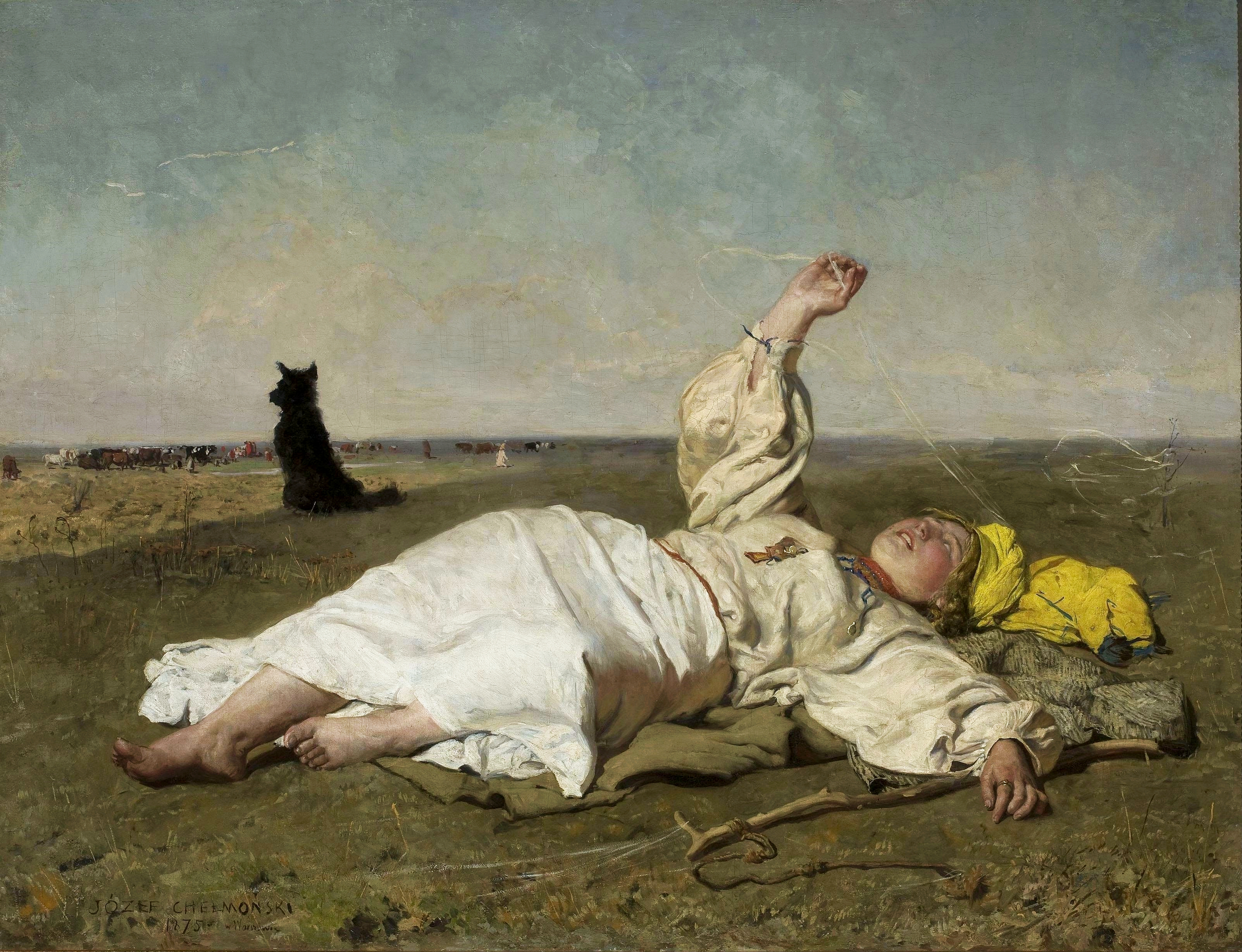
- Artist: Józef Chełmoński
- Year: 1875
- Medium: Oil-on-canvas
- Dimensions: 119.7 cm × 156.5 cm (47.1 in × 61.6 in)
- Location: National Museum, Warsaw

Indian Summer (Polish: Babie lato) is an 1875 oil painting by Polish Realist painter Józef Chełmoński. It is considered one of the artist's most acclaimed works and is currently displayed at the National Museum in Warsaw, Poland.

== Description ==
The painting depicts a young barefoot peasant woman lying in the middle of a pasture and lifting her right hand in which she holds threads of gossamer. She wears a white skirt and shirt. A yellow headscarf lying under her head serves as a contrast and brightens the central part of the composition. The horizon line is placed near the middle of the painting. The sunlight, dry grass and a cloudy sky evoke an aura of a calm September afternoon. On the left, the background portrays a herd of cattle and figures of peasants seen from the distance as well as a black dog sitting and looking in their direction. The painting is dominated by soft shades of brown and grey colours, which emphasizes the atmosphere of Indian summer.

== Analysis ==
The artist painted Indian Summer in 1875 in Warsaw after his recent journey to Ukraine. Chełmoński became fascinated with the observation of rural life and its daily rhythms, which are dictated by nature. When he first exhibited his work at the Zachęta National Gallery of Art, it caused controversy. Some of the viewers and the critics were appalled by the fact that he portrayed a dirty and barefoot peasant woman wearing simple clothes. The scene depicted in the painting was perceived as too realistic. It started to receive proper recognition only after several years.

The painting is an example of a naturalistic brand of Polish Realism. It rejects the consolidated conventions of representation, the academy and its norms and focuses on capturing authenticity based on empirical observation. Indian Summer was meant by Chełmoński to represent the power of the countryside and the vitality of its inhabitants. In 1894, the painting was purchased by art collector Ignacy Korwin-Milewski and in 1929 it was acquired the National Museum in Warsaw. Today, it remains one of the most popular and most frequently reproduced works of art in Poland. The painting is alluded to in the 2023 adaptation of The Peasants, with the costume and pose of the lead female character Jagna (Kamila Urzędowska) during the relevant scene being analogous to that of the original painting's peasant woman.

== See also ==
- List of Polish painters
- Art in Poland
