= Wladimir Giesl von Gieslingen =

Austro-Hungarian army general & diplomat (1860-1936)

Wladimir Freiherr Giesl von Gieslingen
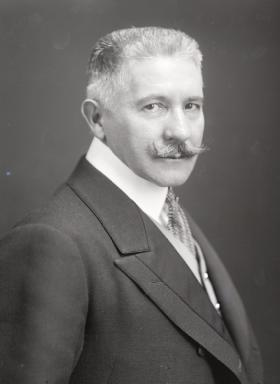

Austro-Hungarian Minister to Montenegro
- In office 10 December 1909 – 13 November 1913
- Preceded by: Otto Freiherr Kuhn von Kuhnenfeld
- Succeeded by: Eduard Otto

Austro-Hungarian Minister to Serbia
- In office 13 November 1913 – 25 July 1914
- Preceded by: Stephan von Ugron zu Ábránfalva
- Succeeded by: None

Personal details
- Born: 18 February 1860 Fünfkirchen, Austrian Empire
- Died: 20 April 1936 (aged 76) Salzburg, Austria
- Relations: Arthur Giesl von Gieslingen (brother)

Wladimir Rudolf Karl Freiherr Giesl von Gieslingen (18 February 1860 – 20 April 1936) was an Austro-Hungarian general and diplomat during World War I, most famous for delivering the ultimatum to the Serbian government during the July Crisis of 1914.

== Life ==
Born in Fünfkirchen (now Pécs) on 18 February 1860 into an officer's family as the youngest son of Heinrich Karl Giesl von Gieslingen (1821–1906), an Austro-Hungarian general who had taken part in the wars of 1848–1849. After studies at the Theresian Military Academy in 1879, he was commissioned as a lieutenant. Following graduation from the War College in 1884, he was promoted and attached to the General Staff. He subsequently served in various units in Tarnau (now Tarnów), Brno, Sarajevo and Theresienstadt (now Terezín).

In 1893, he was appointed as military attaché to the Austro-Hungarian Embassy at Constantinople (now Istanbul) and was promoted to major the following year. Following the Greco-Turkish War of 1897, he took part in the peacekeeping activities on Crete. In 1898, he was additionally appointed as a military attaché in Athens and Sofia and received promotion to colonel in 1900. In 1906, he was promoted to generalmajor and the following year he was a member of the Austro-Hungarian delegation to the Second Hague Peace Conference. In 1909, he was appointed as minister at Cetinje and the following year promoted to feldmarschallleutnant.

On 13 November 1913, Baron Giesl von Gieslingen was appointed Austro-Hungarian minister at Belgrade and would play a key role the following year during the July Crisis. On 28 June 1914, the Austro-Hungarian heir apparent Archduke Franz Ferdinand was assassinated in Sarajevo. On 23 July, he presented the Austro-Hungarian ultimatum to the Serbian authorities with a 48-hour deadline. The instruction from Foreign Minister Count von Berchtold was to leave the country immediately should the Serbian government not accept all the points of the ultimatum. The reply was delivered by the Serbian Prime Minister Pasic five minutes before the deadline expired on 25 July. As the Serbian government did not accept all the points, Baron Giesl von Gieslingen declared that diplomatic relations were broken off and left on a train half an hour later. On 28 July 1914, Austria-Hungary formally declared war with Serbia and World War I had started. Baron Giesl von Gieslingen's role during the July Crisis has been much debated by historians over the years and some have criticised him for leaving Belgrade too rapidly.

Upon his return to Vienna, Baron Giesl von Gieslingen was appointed to be a liaison officer of the Foreign Ministry at the Army Headquarters and promoted to general of the cavalry in August 1914. However, the Chief of the General Staff General Conrad von Hötzendorf accused him of passing on military secrets to Count von Berchtold and wished to see him replaced. Baron Giesl von Gieslingen thus requested to be transferred to the front, which was rejected and he retired in January 1915 from active service.

In 1917, he was sent on a diplomatic mission to Constantinople where he carried out the preparations for the visit of Emperor Karl I in early 1918.

His older brother Arthur was also a general who commanded an army corps during the Serbian campaign in early autumn 1914, but who was replaced after suffering setbacks.

His memoirs, compiled and published by Eduard von Steinitz, throw interesting light on Balkan conditions before the war and add some details concerning the final diplomatic rupture between Austria-Hungary and Serbia in 1914. He was awarded Order of the White Eagle.

Baron Giesl von Gieslingen died at Salzburg on 20 April 1936.

== Bibliography ==
- Eduard Ritter von Steinitz, Zwei Jahrzehnte im Nahen Orient: Aufzeichnungen des Generals der Kavallerie Baron Wladimir Giesl, Berlin, Verlag für Kulturpolitik, 1927.

Diplomatic posts
Preceded by Otto Freiherr Kuhn von Kuhnenfeld	Austro-Hungarian Minister to Montenegro; 1909–1913	Succeeded by Eduard Otto
Preceded by Stephan von Ugron zu Ábránfalva	Austro-Hungarian Minister to Serbia; 1913–1914	Succeeded by None
