= Prit Buttar =

British general practitioner and writer

- Education: Oxford University, London University
- Occupations: General Practitioner, Historian
- Spouse: Debbie
- Children: Dan, Lottie
- Writing career
- Genre: History
- Subjects: World War I, World War II

Prit Buttar is a British general practitioner and writer. He has written twelve history books on the eastern fronts of World War I and World War II, and two novels. Buttar was a senior partner at Abingdon Surgery until he moved to Scotland in late 2017.

== Career ==
Buttar studied medicine at Oxford University and London University, and served in the British Army as a surgeon and medical officer for five years. He later worked in Bristol as a general practitioner (GP). Buttar worked as a GP in Abingdon-on-Thames from 2000 to 2017 and served on the GP's Committee of the British Medical Association. He is Chairman of the Oxfordshire Local Medical Committee.

Buttar's first book, Battleground Prussia, was inspired by one of his patients. The 83-year-old patient recalled stories about her life as a nurse in East Prussia and her escape from the Red Army near the end of World War II. Buttar spent eight years writing the book. His second book, Between Giants, is a study of the battles for the Baltics in WWII, and explores the experiences of people from Lithuania, Latvia, and Estonia.

His third book, Collision of Empires, is a study of the Eastern Front of World War I. It is the first of a four volume series. Before writing the book, Buttar spent a year studying archives in Berlin, Vienna, and Freiberg. With the help of another historian, the multi-lingual Buttar was able to translate the German archives. The second book of the series, Germany Ascendant: The Eastern Front 1915, was released in 2015.

In 2023, Buttar appeared on the history-centered podcast, Out of the Box with Jonathan Russo.

== Personal life ==
Buttar is of Indian descent. He is married to Debbie, an army nurse. They have two children.

== Published works ==
- Battleground Prussia: The Assault on Germany's Eastern Front 1944–45. 2010. Osprey Publishing. ISBN 9781849081900
- Between Giants: The Battle for the Baltics in World War II. 2013. Osprey Publishing. ISBN 9781780961637
- Collision of Empires: The War on the Eastern Front in 1914. 2014. Osprey Publishing. ISBN 9781782006480
- Germany Ascendant: The Eastern Front 1915. 2015. Osprey Publishing. ISBN 9781472807953
- Russia's Last Gasp: The Eastern Front 1916-17. 2016. Osprey Publishing. ISBN 9781472812766
- The Splintered Empires: The Eastern Front 1917–21. 2017. Osprey Publishing. ISBN 9781472819857
- On a Knife's Edge: The Ukraine, November 1942–March 1943. 2018. Osprey Publishing. ISBN 9781472828347
- Retribution: The Soviet Reconquest of Central Ukraine, 1943. 2019. Osprey Publishing. ISBN 9781472835321
- The Reckoning: The Defeat of Army Group South, 1944. 2020. Osprey Publishing. ISBN 9781472837912
- Meat Grinder: The Battles for the Rzhev Salient, 1942–43. 2022. Osprey Publishing. ISBN 9781472851819
- Centuries Will Not Suffice: A History of the Lithuanian Holocaust. 2023. Amberley Publishing. ISBN 9781398115156
- To Besiege a City: Leningrad 1941–42. 2023. Osprey Publishing. ISBN 9781472856555
- Hero City: Leningrad 1943–44. 2024. Osprey Publishing. ISBN 9781472856616
- Bagration 1944: The Great Soviet Offensive. 2025. Osprey Publishing. ISBN 9781472863515
- Into the Reich: The Red Army’s advance to the Oder in 1945. 2025. Osprey Publishing. ISBN 9781472866998
- Berlin: Endgame 1945. 2026. Osprey Publishing. ISBN 9781472869661
- Warsaw: A City at War, 1939–45 (with Ms Lottie Taylor). 2026. Osprey Publishing. ISBN 9781472873408

=== Fiction ===
- There Stood A Soldier: A Novel of Stalingrad. 2017. Lulu Press. ISBN 9781411656390
- Old Friends: A story of love. 2017. Amazon Publishing. ASIN B0777NX8GR
