= Wincenty Wodzinowski =

Polish painter and art teacher

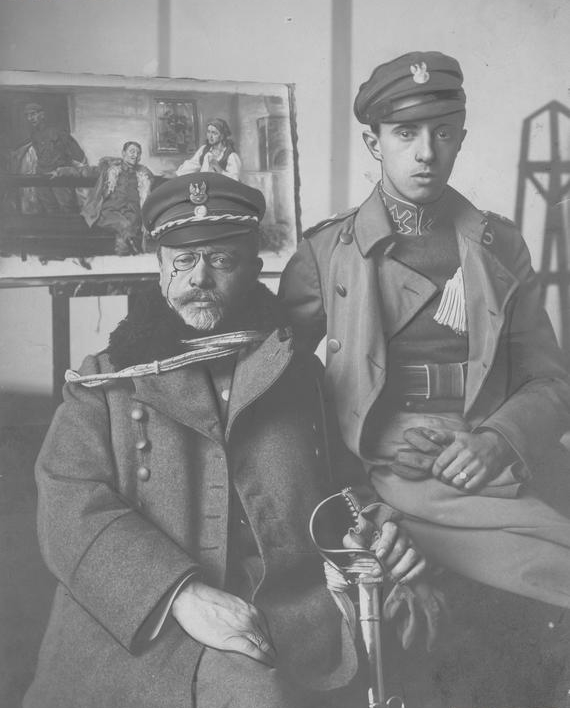
Wodzinowski and his son in their Polish Legion uniforms (1917)

Wincenty Wodzinowski (1866 in Igołomia – 1940 in Kraków) was a Polish painter and art teacher; associated with the Young Poland movement.

== Biography ==
He took his first drawing lessons from 1880 to 1881 with Wojciech Gerson in Warsaw. From 1881 to 1889, he studied at the Kraków Academy of Fine Arts with Władysław Łuszczkiewicz and Jan Matejko. He continued his studies at the Academy of Fine Arts, Munich with Alexander von Wagner from 1891 to 1892. From 1892 to 1907, most of his work was done under contract to Ignacy Korwin-Malewski (1846–1926), a wealthy art collector.

In 1893 and 1894, he was involved in the planning and production of the Racławice Panorama; a project by Jan Styka. From 1896 until the beginning of World War I, he taught advanced painting classes for women at the Museum of Science and Industry in Kraków.

During the war, he was a member of the Polish Legions; producing numerous portrait sketches of his fellow legionnaires; including Leon Berbecki, Kazimierz Sosnkowski and Włodzimierz Zagórski. He was awarded the Order of Polonia Restituta in 1938.

He worked in a wide variety of genres. Many of his works may be seen in the Museum of the Polish Peasant Movement. A street in the Azory district of Kraków is named after him.
