= Józef Męcina-Krzesz =

Polish painter (1860–1934)

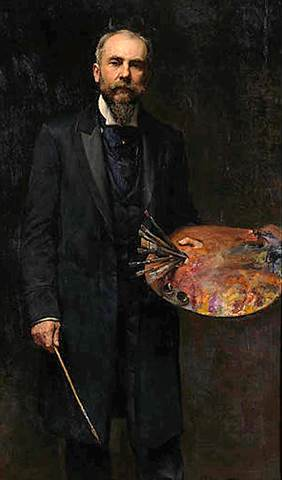
Self-portrait with Palette (1900)

Józef Feliks Męcina-Krzesz (2 January 1860 – 2/3 December 1934) was a Polish painter, known for historical scenes, religious art and portraits.

== Biography ==
He was born in Kraków. From 1877 to 1884, he studied at the Kraków Academy of Fine Arts with Władysław Łuszczkiewicz and Florian Cynk. During the last two years, he also was a private student of Jan Matejko, who encouraged him to focus on history painting.

In 1884, his painting of the Battle of Orsha earned him a scholarship from the Wydział Krajowy (National Department), an executive panel elected by the Diet of Galicia and Lodomeria. Two years later, he used part of that money to go to Paris, where he studied with Jean-Paul Laurens. During this time, he began painting portraits. He also worked as an illustrator for L'Illustration and Le Figaro Illustré and exhibited at the Salon. In 1888, he married Louise Marie Barat, a painter from France.

After travelling throughout Europe, he settled in Kraków in 1894 and, in 1901, was able to acquire a villa in Dębniki. During the First World War, he lived in Prague, where he helped organize an exhibition to aid war refugees. After 1921, he was a resident of Poznań.

He became a member of the governing board of the "General Association of Polish Artists" in 1894, and a member of the "Union Internationale des Beaux-Arts et des Lettres" in 1913. He was awarded the Cross of Merit in 1932.

In his later years, Męcina-Krzesz painted little. Many artists of the generation following his criticized him for being too conservative. He was the object of particular scorn among those who gathered at the Green Balloon, a cabaret frequented by members of the Young Poland movement, and was singled out for ridicule in a poem by Tadeusz Boy-Żeleński called "Słówkach" (Anger). He died in 1934 in Poznań.

== Selected paintings ==
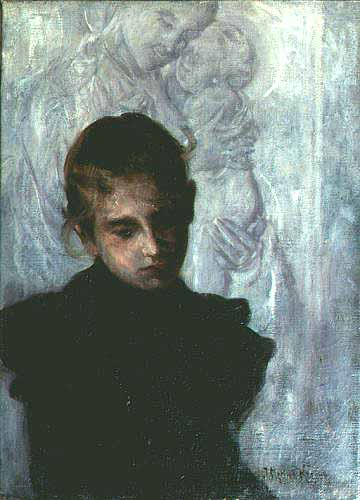
Portrait of a Girl

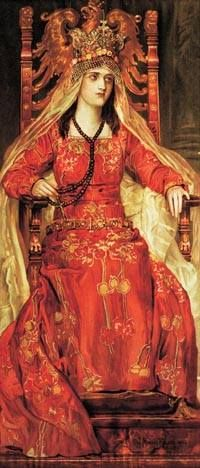
Jadwiga of Poland

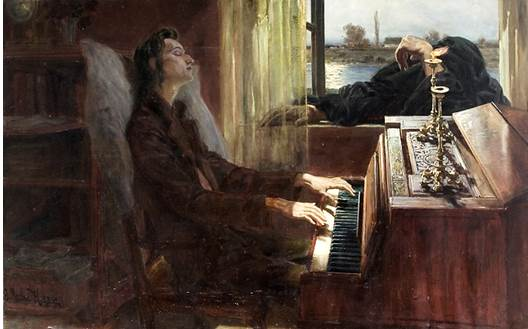
Chopin's Last Chords

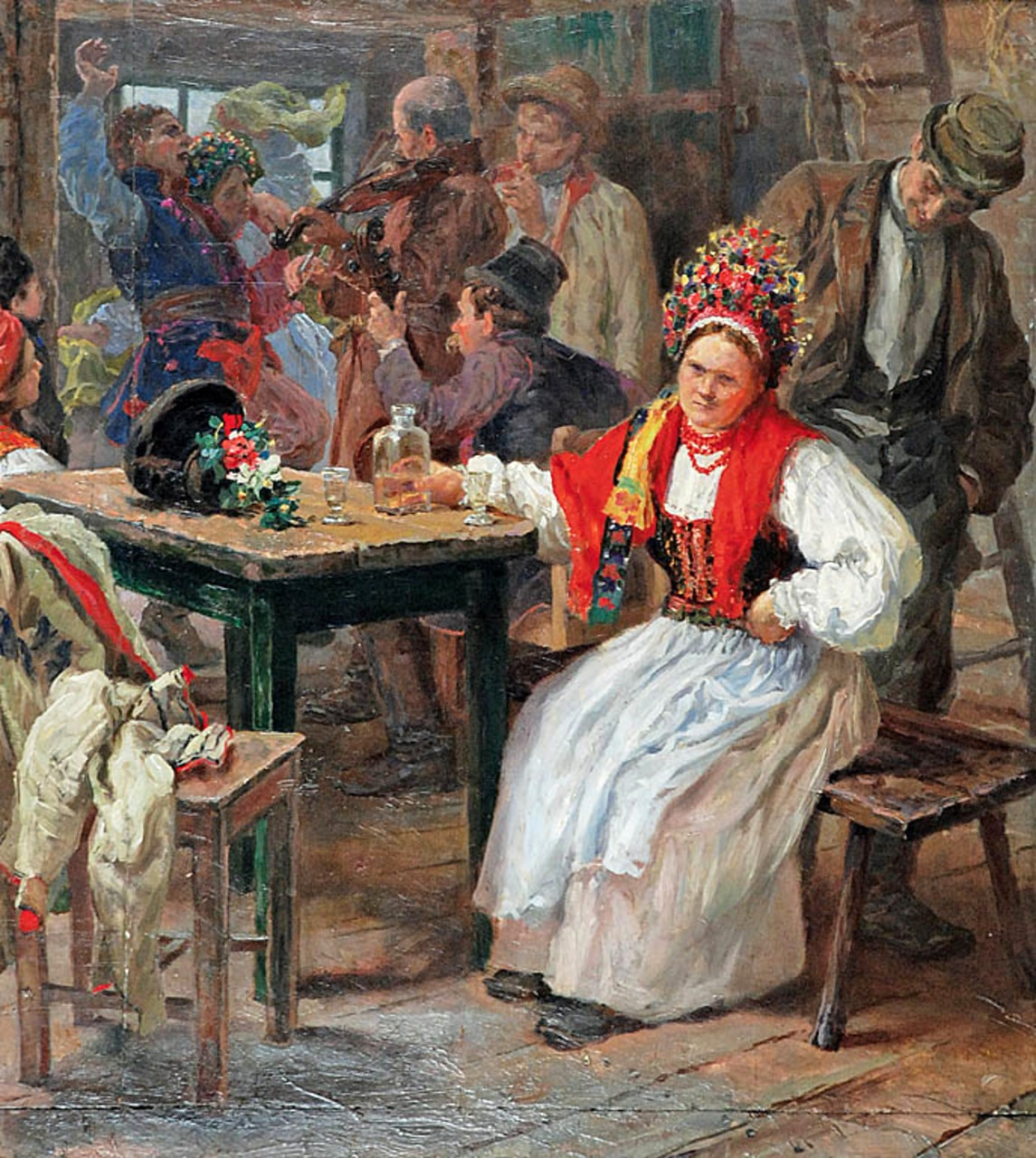
Bride
