= Heeres-Nachrichtenamt =

Military intelligence agency of Austria

- Heeres-Nachrichtenamt (German)
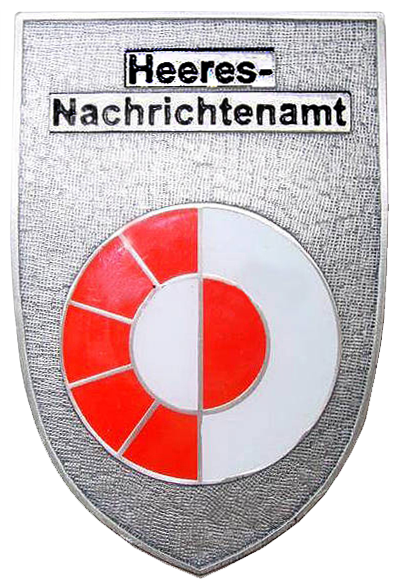
- Logo of the Heeres-Nachrichtenamt

Agency overview
- Formed: 1985
- Agency executive: Sascha Bosezky
- Website: Heeres-Nachrichtenamt

Heeresnachrichtenamt (Army Intelligence Office) is an intelligence agency of the Austrian Armed Forces. Heeresnachrichtenamt researches information on military operations and projects abroad and conducts data analysis of gathered intelligence. The service maintains branch offices in Linz, Graz and Klagenfurt.
