= Marek Mielniczuk =

Polish art deale, antiquarian seller, art collector

Marek Anatol Mielniczuk (born 11 August 1946 in Warsaw) is a Polish art dealer, antiquarian and art collector, active since the 1980s on both the French and Polish art markets. He was the owner of art galleries in Paris and Warsaw, and an advisor to collectors. He has been an art dealer and one of the promoters of the École de Paris.

== Life and work ==
His father was Anatol Mielniczuk (born 21 July 1910 in Radziwiłłów, Volhynia – died 19 July 1981), who before World War II was associated with the Eastern Institute in Warsaw. He worked for the Polish Red Cross and took part in the Warsaw Uprising under the pseudonym "Czarny". The mother of Marek Mielniczuk was Maria Katarzyna Anna Sieniawska.

He attended the Tadeusz Reytan High School in Warsaw. He became a collector during his final years at school. In 1969, he graduated from the Main School of Planning and Statistics (SGPiS, now the Warsaw School of Economics, SGH) in Warsaw, receiving a master's degree in economics from the Faculty of Trade.

He was a judge of the Polish Kennel Club in the 1970s. In 1976, he sold his collection of paintings by the Kapists. During that decade he was influenced by the art historian Jerzy Sienkiewicz, although he also maintained contacts with a woman known as Maria from the Persian market near Warsaw East railway station. He worked at the “Artel” agency, which dealt with promotion and advertising for Polish Television. Between 1983 and 1984, he served as deputy director of the Komedia Theatre under Olga Lipińska. On 27 July 1984, he left for Paris. He bought Polish-related works at flea markets, including a portrait of Jan Reszke, a painting by Paweł Merwart, Flowers by Gustaw Gwozdecki, and a painting by Olga Boznańska. He also searched for Polonica through advertisements in the press. On 2 January 1986, he founded his own art gallery in Paris – Galerie Marek – initially located in the Louvre des Antiquaires, specializing in the painting of the École de Paris and Central European art. He also operated a Galerie Marek in Warsaw. In Paris, the gallery was later located at 21, rue de Miromesnil. He published catalogues of successive École de Paris exhibitions, including those held on 6 October 1988, 22 March 1990, and 3 October 1990. In November 1988, he assisted in organizing the exhibition “École de Paris – Boulogne” at the Musée municipal de Boulogne-Billancourt. In 1991, he lost his gallery in Paris due to a mistake by his notary and an increase in rent. He then decided to leave Paris.

He was one of the main suppliers of works to the collection of the American collector Tom Podl (1938–2011), exhibited at the National Museum in Kraków and the National Museum in Wrocław. In press interviews he emphasized the importance of honesty and personal relationships with clients in the work of an art dealer, while criticizing market speculation.

He closely collaborated with Wojciech Fibak as a collecting advisor. Along with Zbigniew Legutko, he is mentioned as one of the key figures who helped Fibak build his art collection. He also contributed to the creation of the École de Paris painting collection at the Villa la Fleur.

== Jewess with Oranges ==
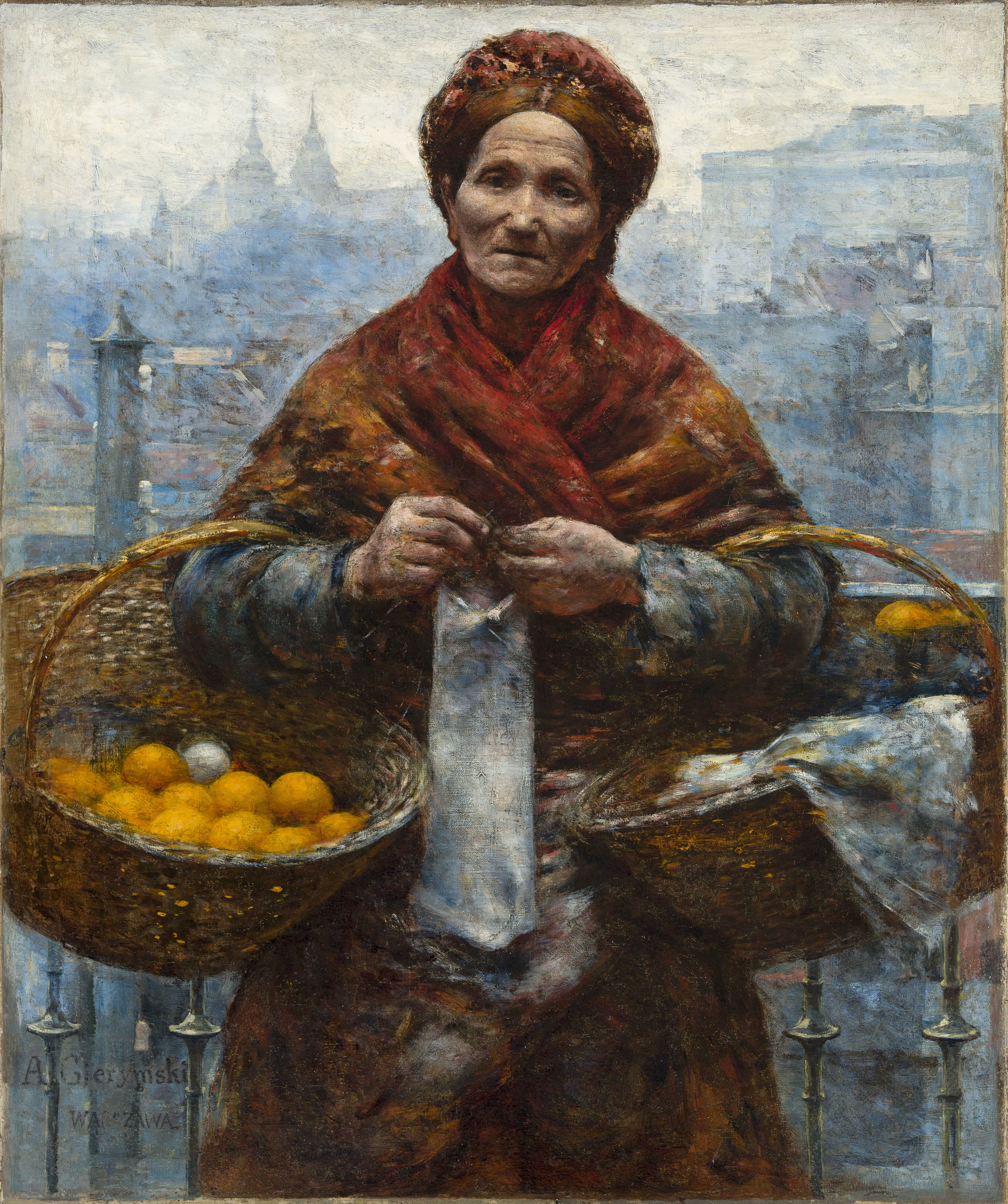
Jewess with Oranges

In November 2010, at the invitation of Gazeta Wyborcza journalist Włodzimierz Kalicki, Mielniczuk took part in a trip to Buxtehude, Germany, to examine Jewess with Oranges by Aleksander Gierymski, offered at the Eva Aldag auction house. He confirmed the authenticity of the painting, pointing out that the differences compared to the pre-war photograph were the result of post-war, unprofessional overpainting and trimming of the canvas. Together with Kalicki, he established the details of the conservation interventions and confirmed that it was a painting stolen from the National Museum, Warsaw.

In order to preserve the possibility of further action, he formally declared an interest in participating in the auction, which allowed contact with the auction house to be maintained. The day before the auction, Kalicki published an article in Gazeta Wyborcza, after which the Polish Ministry of Culture and National Heritage intervened in Germany. On the same day, a German court ordered the seizure of the painting, and the Hamburg police secured the Pomarańczarka.

Earlier, he had identified at an auction in France another painting by Gierymski (Louvre at Night), which subsequently entered the collection of the National Museum in Warsaw.

== Château de Kergroadez ==
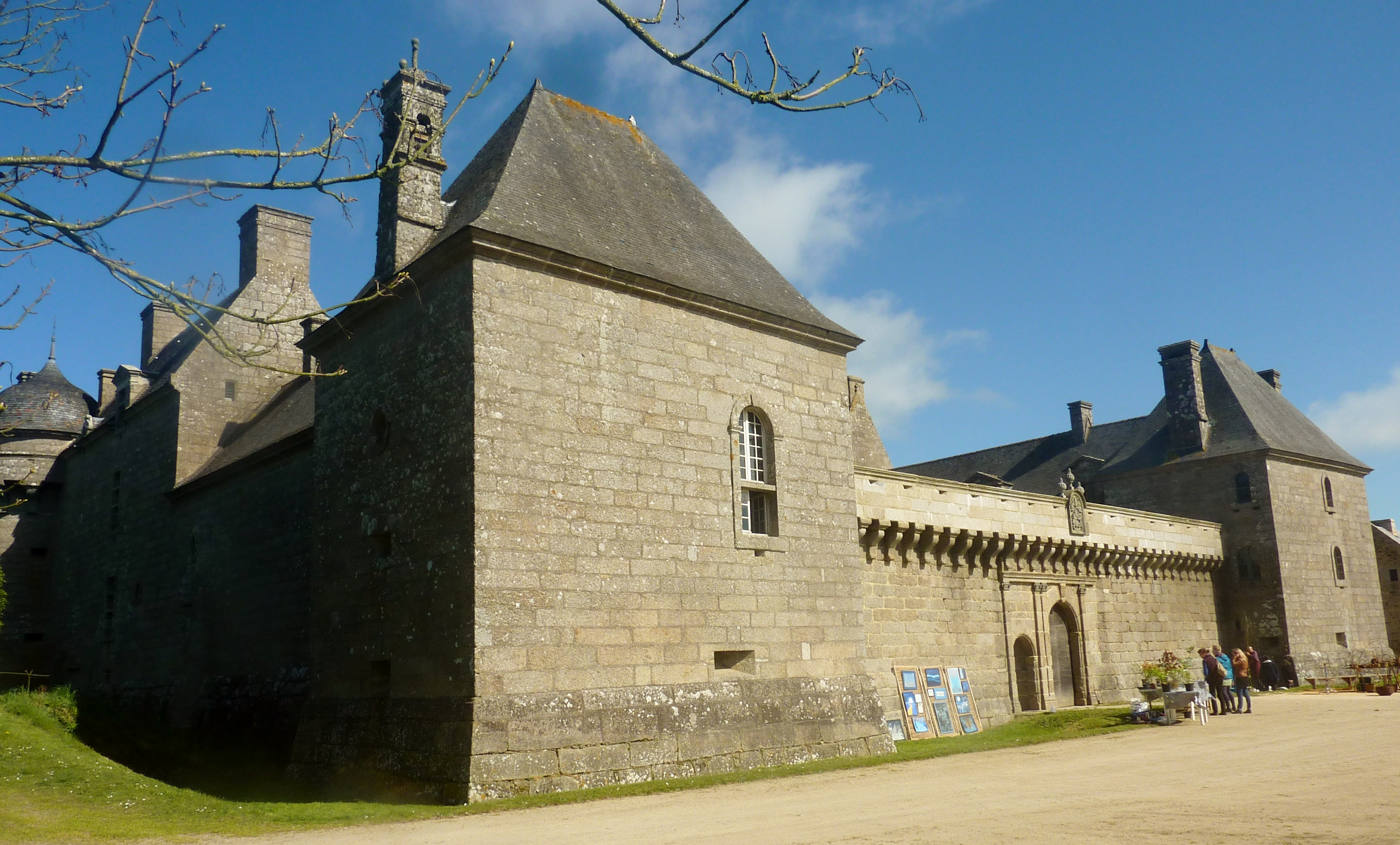
Château de Kergroadez

In 1992, Mielniczuk purchased the Renaissance Château de Kergroadez in Brélès (Brittany), dating from the early 17th century. He was the third owner of the property. The first restoration had been carried out in 1913. Mielniczuk's intention was to transform the estate into an art gallery, open it to visitors, and host music concerts. In accordance with the requirements of the heritage conservator, he restored six rooms in the main wing of the castle, adapting them for exhibition purposes. He also sought to recreate about 10 hectares of gardens. Next to the château are a forest and a lake.

In May 1995, thanks to his efforts, the château was placed on the list of French historic monuments as a Monument Historique and, for the first time in its history, was opened to the public. At the opening, a Chopin concert was performed by Ewa Osińska. He received the Vieilles Maisons Françaises award for this restoration. The château was also rented for weddings and hosted classical music concerts. The rooms, four and a half meters high, were heated by fireplaces three and a half meters wide. At that time, he also considered buying the “little château” in Doëlan, Brittany, where Władysław Ślewiński had worked. For personal reasons, in 2000 Mielniczuk sold the property to new owners, who continued its restoration and kept it opened for cultural and tourist purposes. He then returned to Warsaw, and in 2001 opened the Galerie Marek in the Panorama shopping center.

He runs the Cabinet d'expertises Bobrowska-Mielniczuk, which specializes in provenance research of works of art of the École de Paris.

He has three sons. One of them, Maurycy, is also an art dealer.

== Statements and publications ==
- Co ma wisieć? Gust polski – interview, Gazeta Wyborcza – Duży Format, 2005
- Wstydliwe pieniądze – interview, Rzeczpospolita, 2001

== Film and television ==
- 1999 – Klan (television series) – art gallery owner
- 2019 – Czarny Mercedes (feature film) – man at Café Muza
