= Gierymski =

Gierymski, feminine: Gierymska is a Polish-language surname. Notable people with this surname include

- Aleksander Gierymski (1850–1901), Polish painter
- Maksymilian Gierymski (1846–1874), Polish painter
- Tadeusz Gierymski, Polish poet
