= In the Arbour =

1882 painting by Aleksander Gierymski

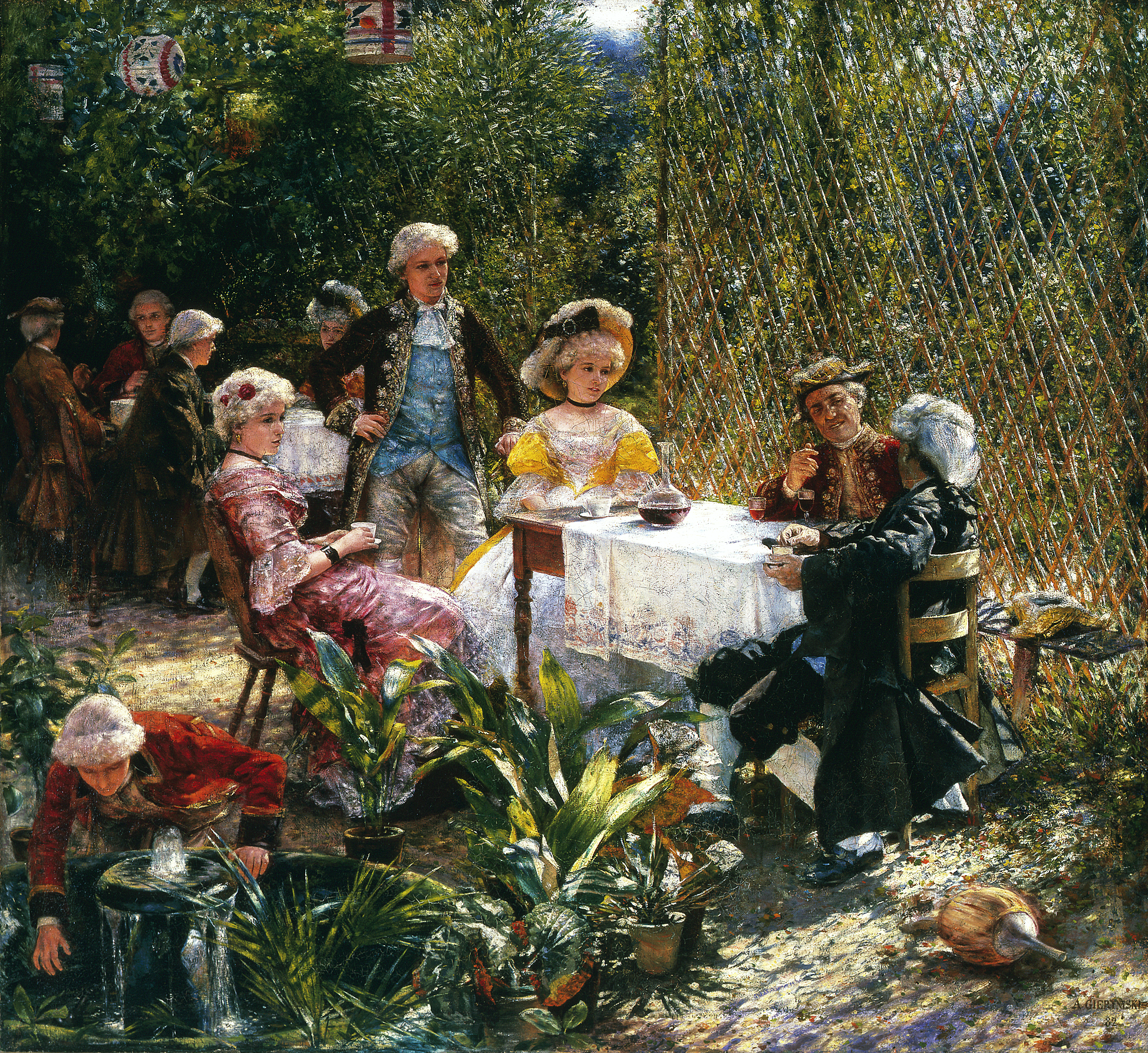
- Artist: Aleksander Gierymski
- Year: 1882
- Medium: Oil-on-canvas
- Dimensions: 135.5 cm × 148 cm (53.3 in × 58.2 in)
- Location: National Museum, Warsaw

In the Arbour (Polish: W altanie) is an oil painting created by Polish Realist painter Aleksander Gierymski in 1882. It is displayed at the National Museum in Warsaw, Poland.

== Description ==
The painting shows a social gathering of a group of aristocrats portrayed in 18th-century clothes, which takes place on a summer day in a garden. In the centre there are four figures engaged in a conversation sitting beside a table and one standing next them. A white tablecloth, cups and a decanter half-filled with wine lie on the table. The background consists of a trellis on the right and trees with another group of people sitting by a table on the left. In the bottom left-hand corner of the painting there is a man leaning over a fountain as well as several plants in flowerpots. The painting is filled with light and deep, vivid colours creating a sensuous atmosphere of a hot summer day.

== Analysis ==
In the Arbour was painted by Gierymski in 1882 after his stay in Rome and is considered to be the artist's approach to Impressionism. It was also his protest against associating his works primarily with depicting the life of the poor, which was a characteristic feature of the artist's early paintings. He wanted to prove to the critics that realistic techniques of artistic expression can depict various kind of scenes including those relating to the life of the upper classes. The artist put great attention to detail and decided to dress the figures in the painting in elegant clothes from the previous century as a way of demonstrating his artistic skills. Gierymski's work can be compared to contemporary French impressionists, even though he had not yet been to Paris and there was no evidence that he had seen their work.

== See also ==
- Maksymilian Gierymski
- List of Polish painters
