= Jewess with Oranges =

1881 painting by Aleksander Gierymski

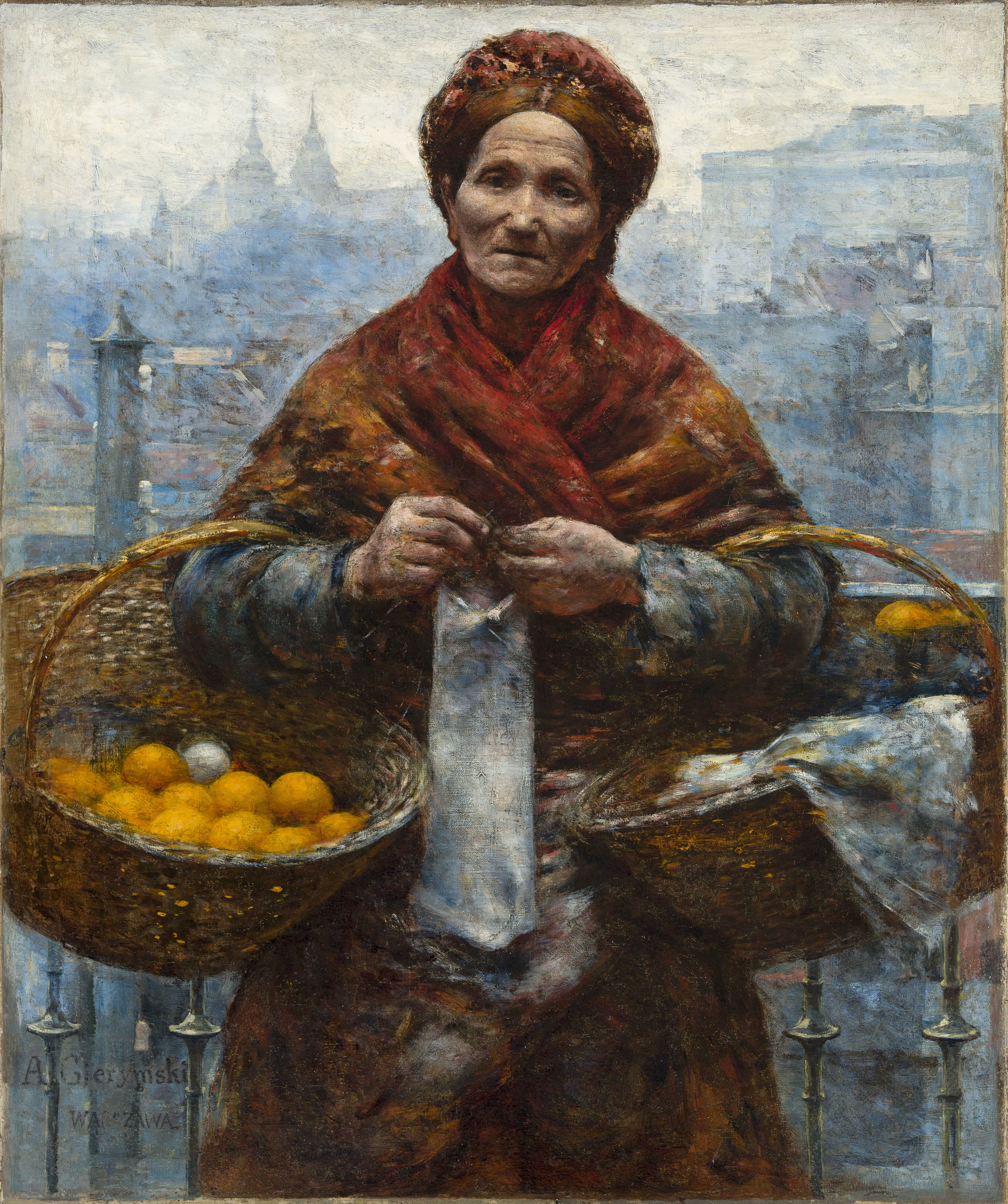
- Artist: Aleksander Gierymski
- Year: 1880–1881
- Medium: Oil on canvas
- Dimensions: 66 cm × 55 cm (26 in × 22 in)
- Location: National Museum; Warsaw

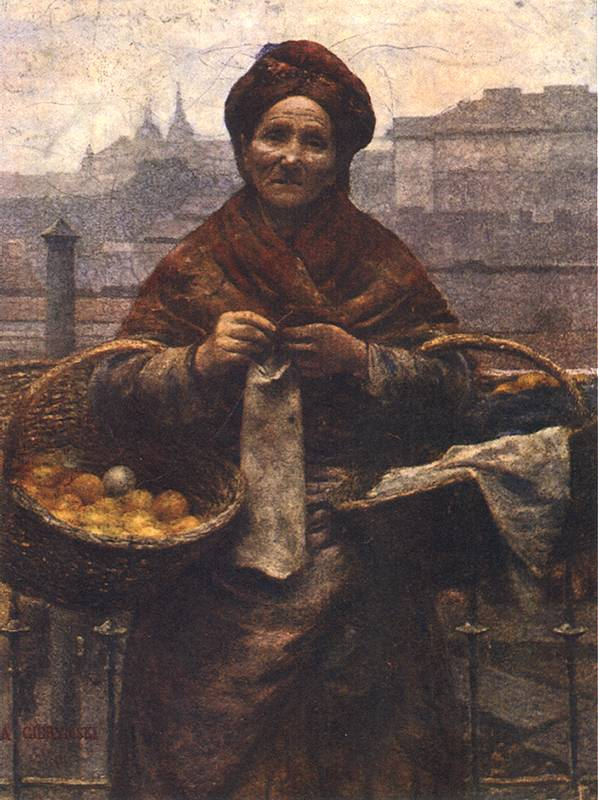
Jewess with Lemons similar painting by the same artist 1881, Silesian Museum (Katowice)

Jewess with Oranges (Polish: Żydówka z pomarańczami, Pomarańczarka, Przekupka z pomarańczami) is an oil painting on canvas by Aleksander Gierymski finished in 1881 and purchased by the National Museum in Warsaw in 1928.

It was looted by the Nazis in Germany-occupied Poland during World War II, and recovered only in 2011.

== Description ==
It was painted in oil technique between 1880-81 in Warsaw. The painting shows a Jewish shopkeeper, whom the artist immortalized in another image Jewess with Lemons. The woman has poor clothing, a cap on her head, and a scarf on her shoulders. She is carrying two baskets of oranges. The background depicts the roofs of Warsaw houses. The woman's face is serious. Her highlighted cheeks as well as prominent wrinkles heighten the effect of sadness and helplessness, which emanates directly from her character. In contrast, there are the oranges whose color is a reference to life, heat, and the southern climate. The painter signed his name in the lower left corner and put the name of the city where he painted the picture.

== History ==
The image originally belonged to the antique store Dom Sztuki in Warsaw and was purchased by the National Museum of Warsaw on 23 February 1928. During the World War II looting of Poland, the painting was stolen by German forces. Since 1945, Poland sought the discovery of its whereabouts and its return. On 26 November 2010, the painting appeared in an antique market in Buxtehude, Germany. In November 2010, at the invitation of Gazeta Wyborcza journalist Włodzimierz Kalicki and Marek Mielniczuk took part in a trip to Buxtehude, Germany, to examine the painting. Mielniczuk confirmed the authenticity of the painting, pointing out that the differences compared to the pre-war photograph were the result of post-war, unprofessional overpainting and trimming of the canvas. Together with Kalicki, he established the details of the conservation interventions and confirmed that it was a painting stolen from the National Museum, Warsaw. The Polish Ministry of Culture and National Heritage began negotiations to bring the painting back to Poland. The talks were successful, and on 15 July 2011, after compensation was paid by the Polish PZU Foundation to the German owner, Jewess with Oranges returned to the National Museum. The amount paid has not been disclosed.

== See also ==
- Portrait of Adele Bloch-Bauer I—a painting stolen by the Nazis and recovered by Maria Altmann
