= Peasant Coffin =

1894 painting by Aleksander Gierymski

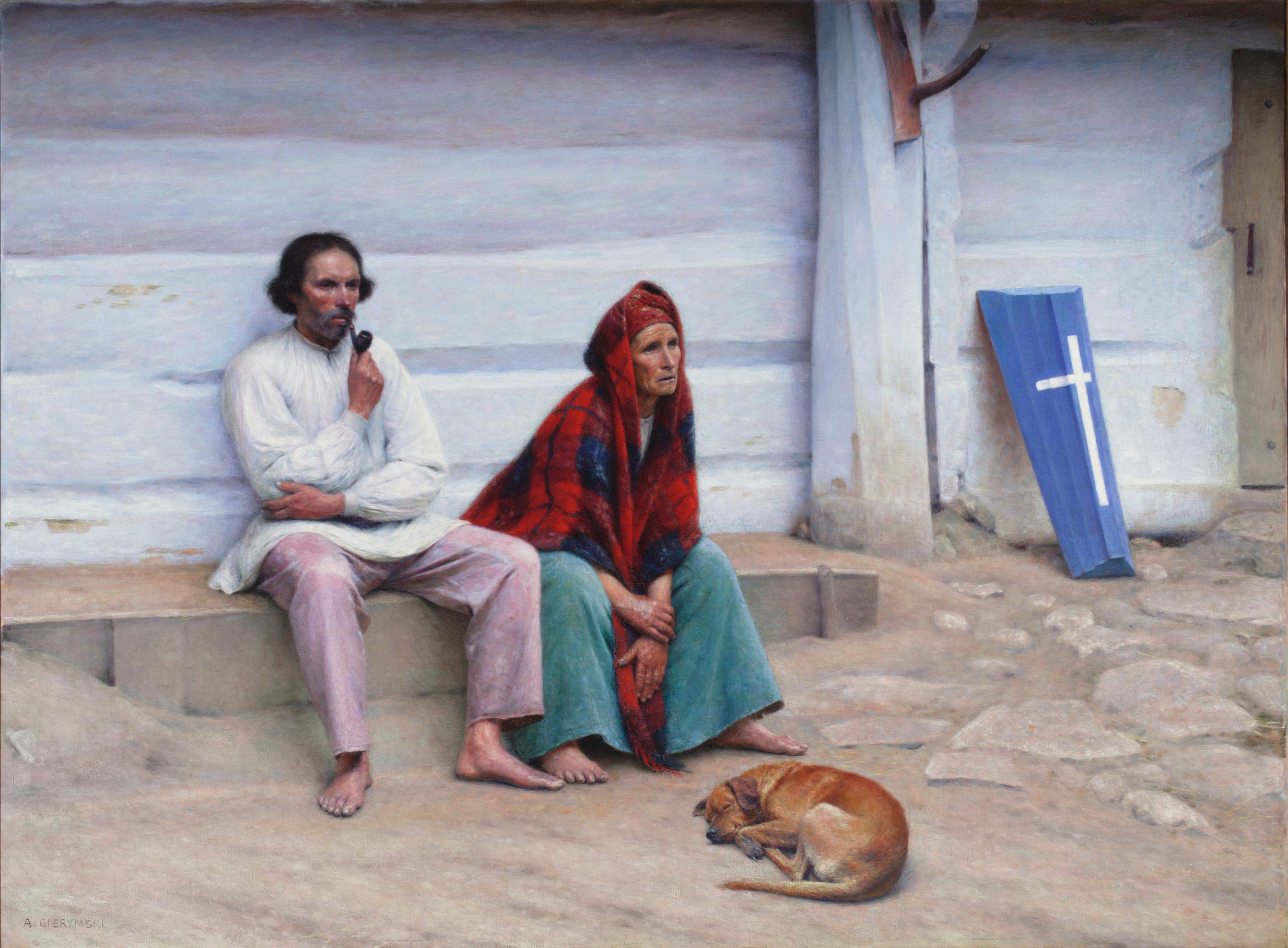
- Artist: Aleksander Gierymski
- Year: 1894
- Medium: Oil-on-canvas
- Dimensions: 141 cm × 195 cm (55.5 in × 76.7 in)
- Location: National Museum, Warsaw

Peasant Coffin (Polish: Trumna chłopska) is an oil painting by Polish artist Aleksander Gierymski, created in 1895.

== Description ==
The painting shows a sad peasant couple sitting outside their house with a child-sized coffin nearby.

During his stay in Krakow in 1893 and 1894. Gierymski frequented Włodzimierz Tetmajer, who lived in Bronowice Małe. At that time Aleksander Gierymski drew first sketches for Peasant Coffin. This painting was the last of Gierymski's figural compositions. Later Gierymski painted only landscapes and vedutas.

The painting is in the collection of the National Museum in Warsaw.

== Atmosphere ==
Polish filmmaker Andrzej Wajda wrote:

I don't know a picture in Polish art, where the occurrence of tragedy is equally strong. Exactly tragedy, not drama. In this painting, there is a spirit of ancient tragedy, which always reaches its conclusion, in full daylight, in front of the neighbors, in front of the house.
