= Maksymilian Gierymski =

Polish painter (1846–1874)

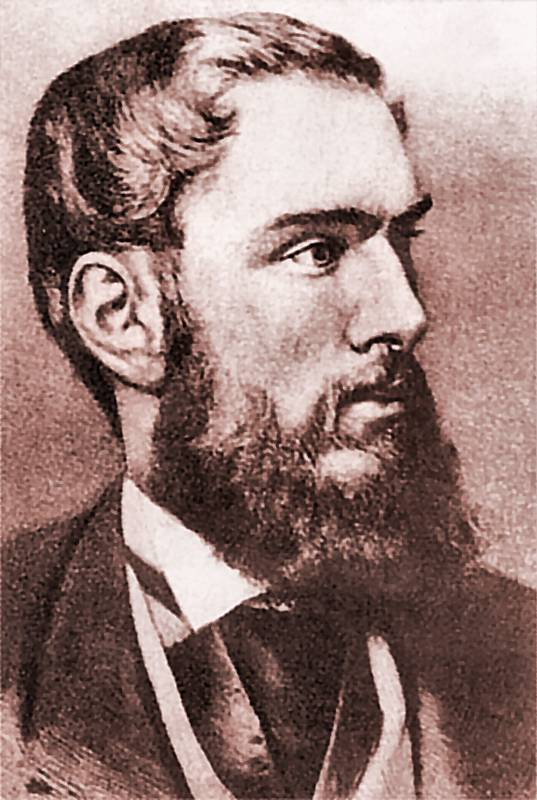
Maksymilian Gierymski

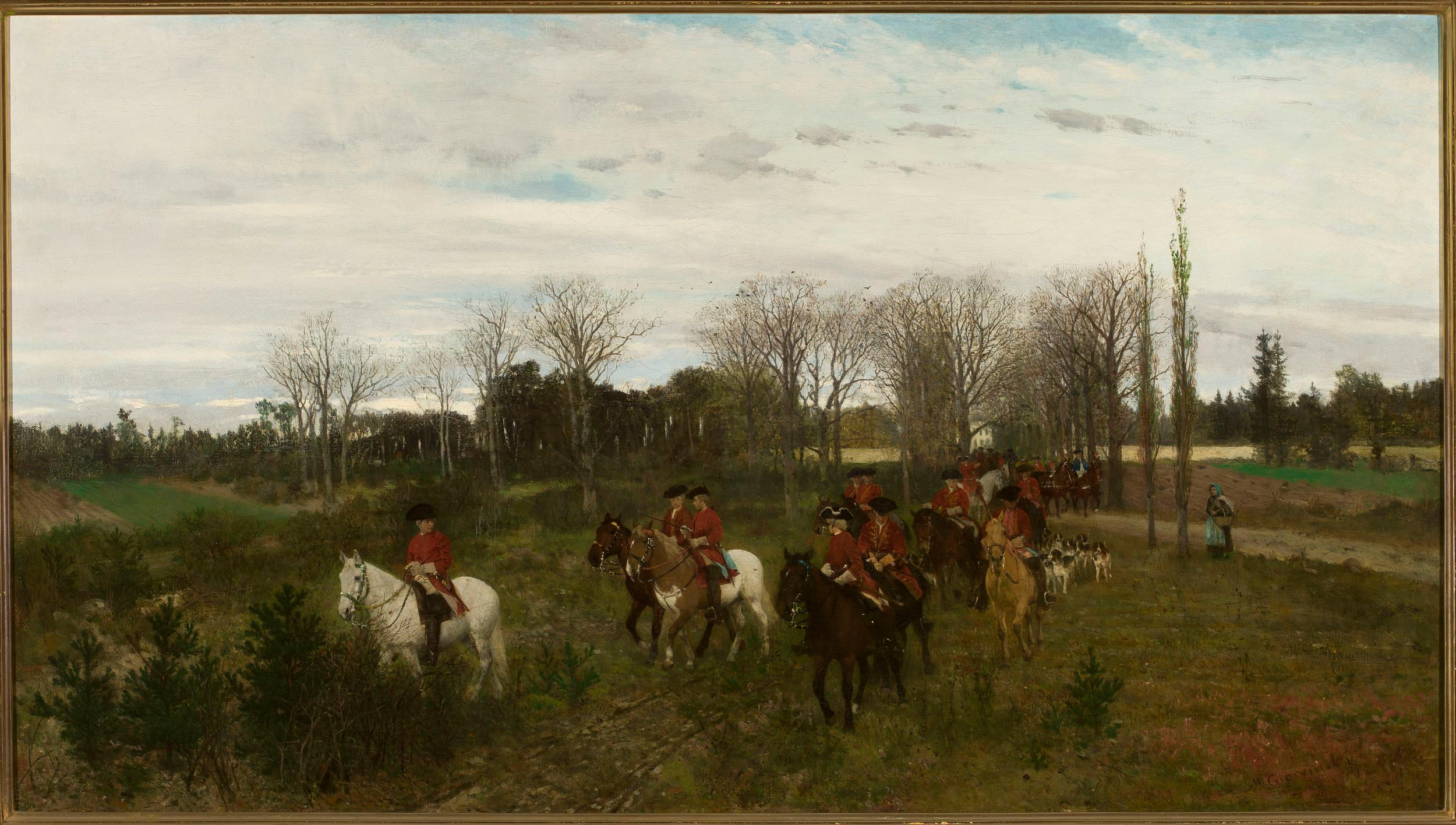
Maksymilian Gierymski, A Hunting Party, 1871

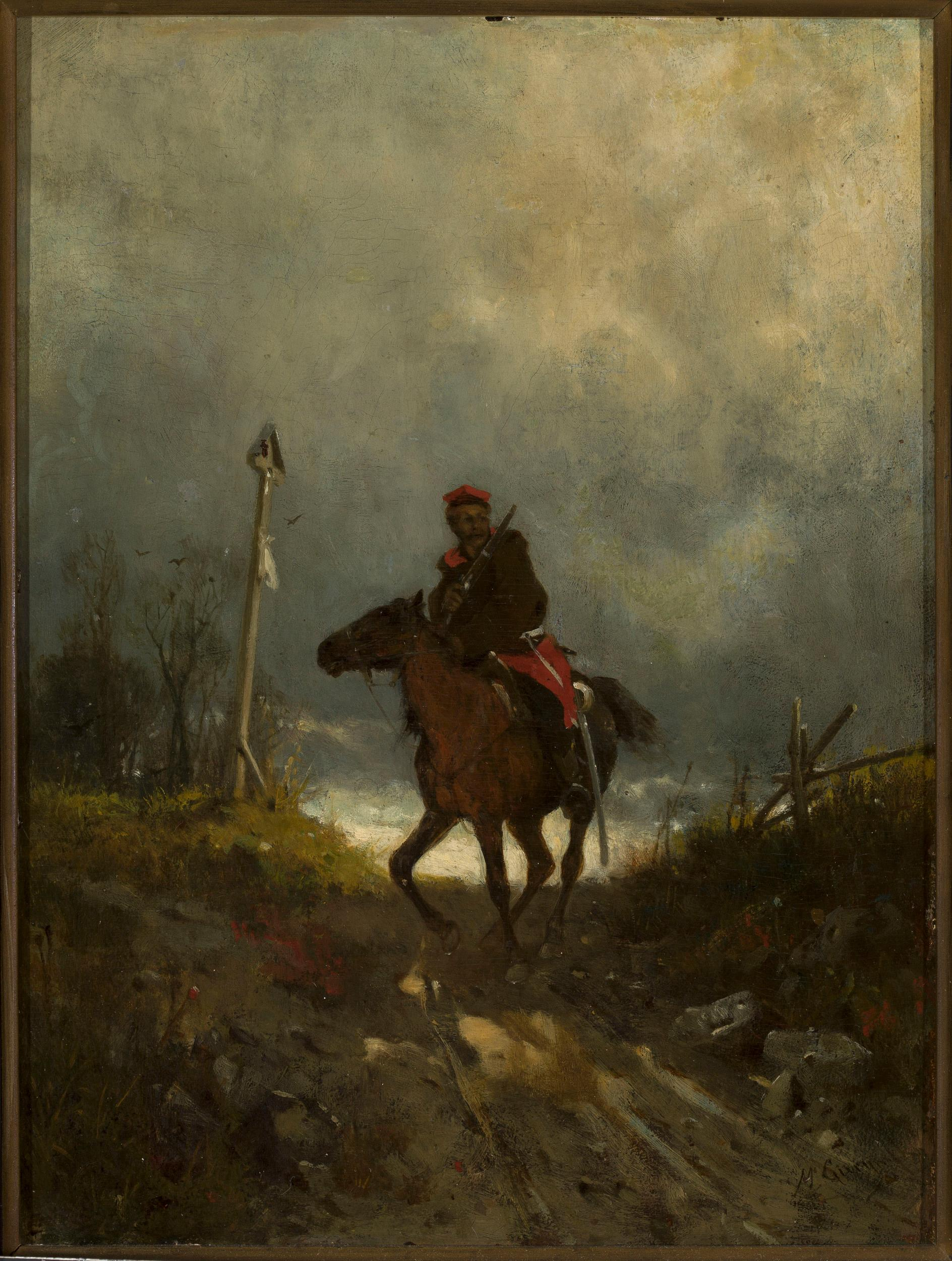
Maksymilian Gierymski, Insurgent from 1863, c. 1869

Maksymilian Dionizy Gierymski (1846 in Warsaw – 1874 in Reichenhall, Bavaria) was a Polish painter, specializing mainly in watercolours. He was the older brother of painter Aleksander Gierymski.

As a seventeen-year-old boy, he participated in the January Uprising. He was educated at the Warsaw Drawing School initially, but then received a government scholarship in 1867 and went to study at the Academy of Fine Arts in Munich. He became one of the leading painters of the Munich realistic school. Initially best known for this battle paintings, he also created many landscape paintings, especially of southern Poland, which he visited several times.

Completely successful in western Europe, he did not gain approval nor popularity in Poland of the 19th century, although he sent paintings to exhibitions in Warsaw regularly from 1868 on.

== Selected works ==
- Krajobraz leśny (1866)
- Krajobraz z chatą i zaprzęgiem (1867)
- Potyczka z Tatarami (1867)
- Szarża rosyjskiej artylerii konnej (1867)
- Wymarsz powstańców ze wsi w 1863 roku (1867)
- Brzoza (1867)
- Pogrzeb w małym miasteczku (1868)
- Powrót bez pana (1868)
- Zwiad kozaków kubańskich (1868–69)
- Pejzaż jesienny z oraczem (1868–69)
- Krajobraz jesienny - studium pejzażu (1868–69)
- Rzeka (1868–70)
- Krajobraz o wschodzie słońca - przedświt (1869)
- Rekonesans huzarów austriackich (1869)
- Patrol polski w 1830 roku (1869)
- Adiutant sztabowy z 1830 roku (1869)
- Powstaniec z 1863 roku (1869)
- Droga wśród drzew (1870)
- Wyjazd na polowanie I (1871)
- Zima w małym miasteczku (1872)
- Patrol powstańczy przy ognisku (1872)
- Patrol powstańczy - pikieta (1872–73)
- Wiosna w małym miasteczku (1872–73)
- Noc (1872–74)

== Bibliography ==
Maciej Masłowski: Maksymilian Gierymski i jego czasy (Maksymilian Gierymski and His Times), Warsaw 1970, ed. "PIW" (National Publishing Institute, 2nd edition - 1976).
