= Włodzimierz Kalicki =

Polish writer and journalist

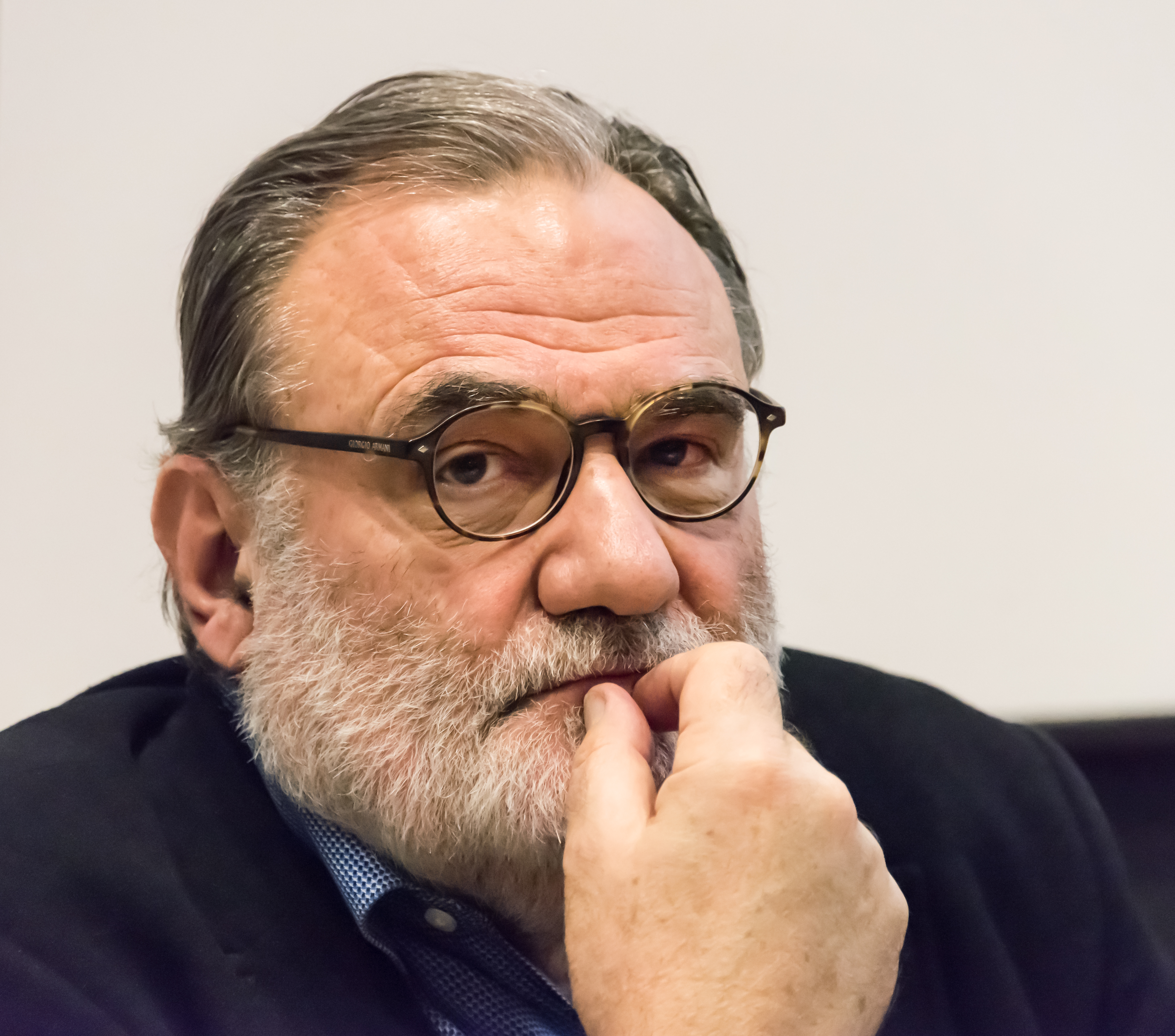
Włodzimierz Kalicki

Włodzimierz Kalicki (born 1955) is a Polish writer and journalist. He published his first articles in the underground bibuła papers in the 1970s in the People's Republic of Poland. He received an underground award during martial law in Poland in 1981. In 1989 he joined the team of Gazeta Wyborcza, the first independent Polish newspaper. He has received several journalism awards for his articles and has written several books.

== Works ==
- Inaczej (1989)
- Panowie na zabytkach (1991)
- W domu smoka (1998)
- Powrót do Sulejówka (2001)
- Ostatni jeniec wielkiej wojny. Polacy i Niemcy po 1945 roku (2002)
