= Aleksander Gierymski =

Polish painter (1850–1901)

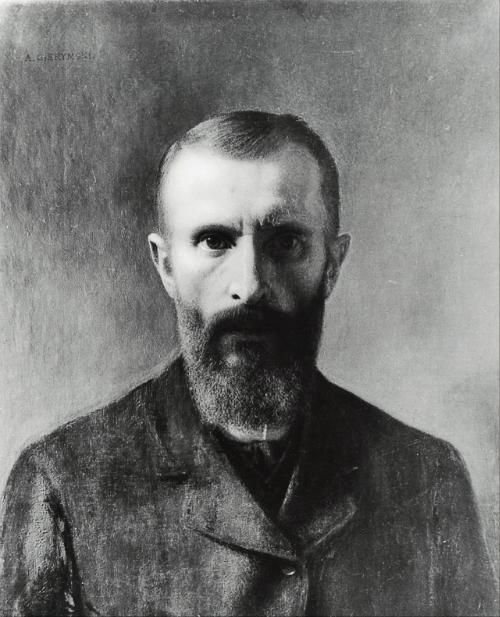
- Aleksander Gierymski, self-portrait, 1900
- Born: Ignacy Aleksander Gierymski; 30 January 1850; Warsaw, Poland, Russian Empire
- Died: 8 March 1901 (aged 51); Rome, Kingdom of Italy
- Education: Munich Academy of Fine Arts
- Known for: Painter
- Notable work: Jewess with Oranges; In the Arbour; Peasant Coffin; Sandblasters; The Feast of Trumpets; The Sea
- Movement: Realism, Impressionism

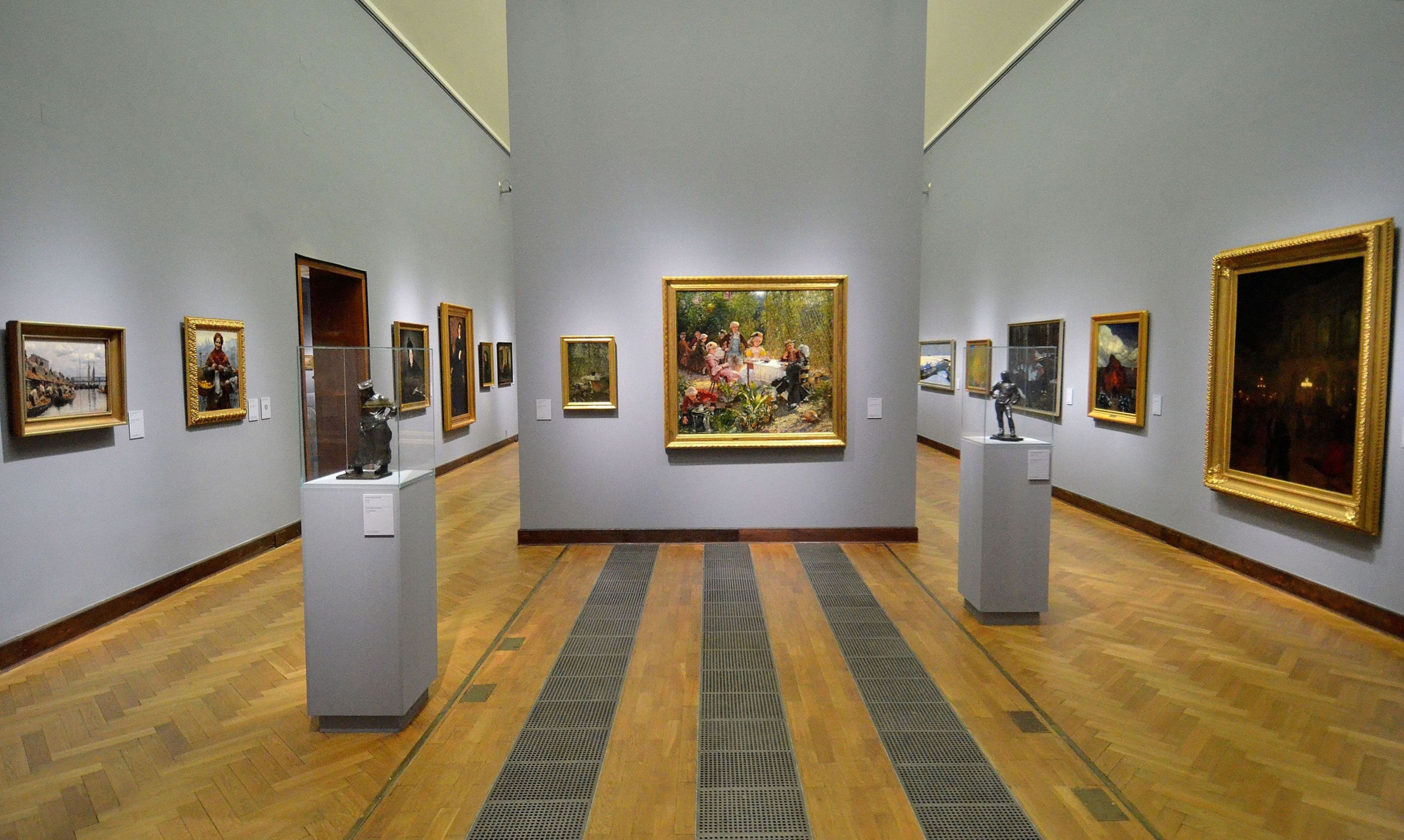
Paintings of Aleksander Gierymski displayed in the National Museum in Warsaw

Ignacy Aleksander Gierymski (30 January 1850, Warsaw – d. 6–8 March 1901, Rome) was a Polish painter of the late 19th century, the younger brother of Maksymilian Gierymski. He was a representative of Realism as well as an important precursor of Impressionism in Poland.

== Biography ==
Aleksander Gierymski completed Secondary State School nr III in Warsaw in 1867, and in the same year commenced drawing studies in Warsaw. Between 1868 and 1872 he studied at the Academy of Fine Arts in Munich and graduated with a gold medal. He received a commendation for his diploma work The Merchant of Venice. Between 1873 and 1874 he stayed in Italy, mostly in Rome. There he completed his first famous works: Roman Inn and Morra Game, which Gierymski brought to Warsaw in the beginning of 1875 and exhibited at Zachęta Gallery. Both paintings received the attention of audiences and critics.

From late 1875 until 1879 the artist returned to Rome, where he worked to improve his work, particularly spending much time studying Italian paintings. The most important work of the Roman period was his painting In the Arbour. It was an approach to impressionism, which was preceded by extensive studies in this area (for example Cylinder on a table, Man in red tail-coat among others). In the painting In the Arbour, we can see the scene of an 18th-century social gathering, which takes place in a gazebo filled with light from behind. Such scenes allowed him to play with colours and light. Gierymski's work can be compared to contemporary French impressionists, even though he had not yet been in Paris and there was no evidence that he had seen their work.

The greatest period for Gierymski was between the years 1879 and 1888 which he spent in Warsaw. In this time he worked with a group of young positivist writers and painters, clustered around the periodical Wędrowiec (Eng. Wanderer). Responsible for art affairs in these magazines was Stanisław Witkiewicz, who took up a battle for Gierymski's public recognition. Paintings, which Gierymski made in this period, for example, Jewish women selling oranges; The Old Town Gate, Solec’s Marina, The Feast of Trumpets and Sandblasters and others are based on the lives of poor people from two districts in Warsaw – Powiśle and Old Town. Unfortunately, his works were never understood and respected in contemporary Poland. As other unappreciated persons in his motherland, without livelihoods, he left Warsaw behind and went abroad in 1888.

Following his departure from Poland he lived largely in Germany and France. As his environment changed, his work changed as well. Away from his homeland, he started to paint subjects that weren't so personal. He was mostly painting landscapes (Kufstein Castel Outlook, Part of Rothenburg, sea landscapes). He was frequently painting at night, which allowed him to paint objects under artificial light, such as (Munich nocturnes, Paris Opera at Night, Twilight over Seine).

He came back to Poland in 1893 and stayed till 1895, in order to apply for a position at the Academy of Fine Arts in Cracow. This journey revived his interest in human subjects. The Peasant's Coffin is one of the paintings from that period.

For the last years of his life he remained in Italy. From that latter period came works like Interior of Basilica of San Marco in Venice, Piazza del Popolo in Rome or outlooks of Verona.

His bitter disappointments in life are revealed on his self-portrait painted a year prior to his death. He looked at the world with the eye of a naturalist, despite his hot-temper. Tragically, the last years of his life were spent in a mental hospital; nevertheless he left a unique heritage. His works represented realism, like Courbet’s, and he wasn't afraid to represent all matters of life, including the lives of humble people.

Gierymski died between 6 and 8 of March 1901 in Rome in a mental hospital on Via della Lungara Street. He was buried at the Campo Verano Cemetery in Rome on 10 March 1901.

== Gallery ==
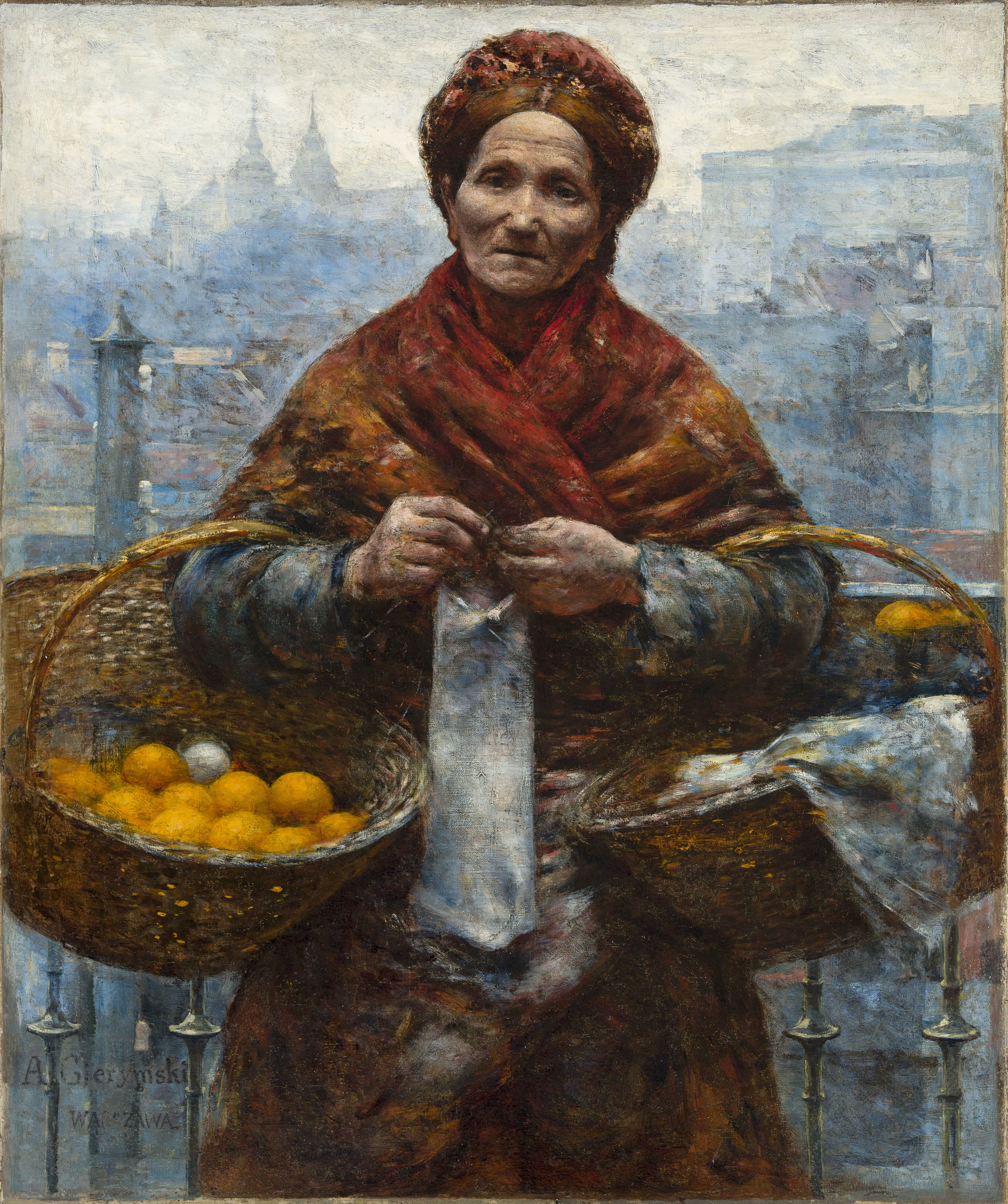
Jewess with Oranges, 1880-1881

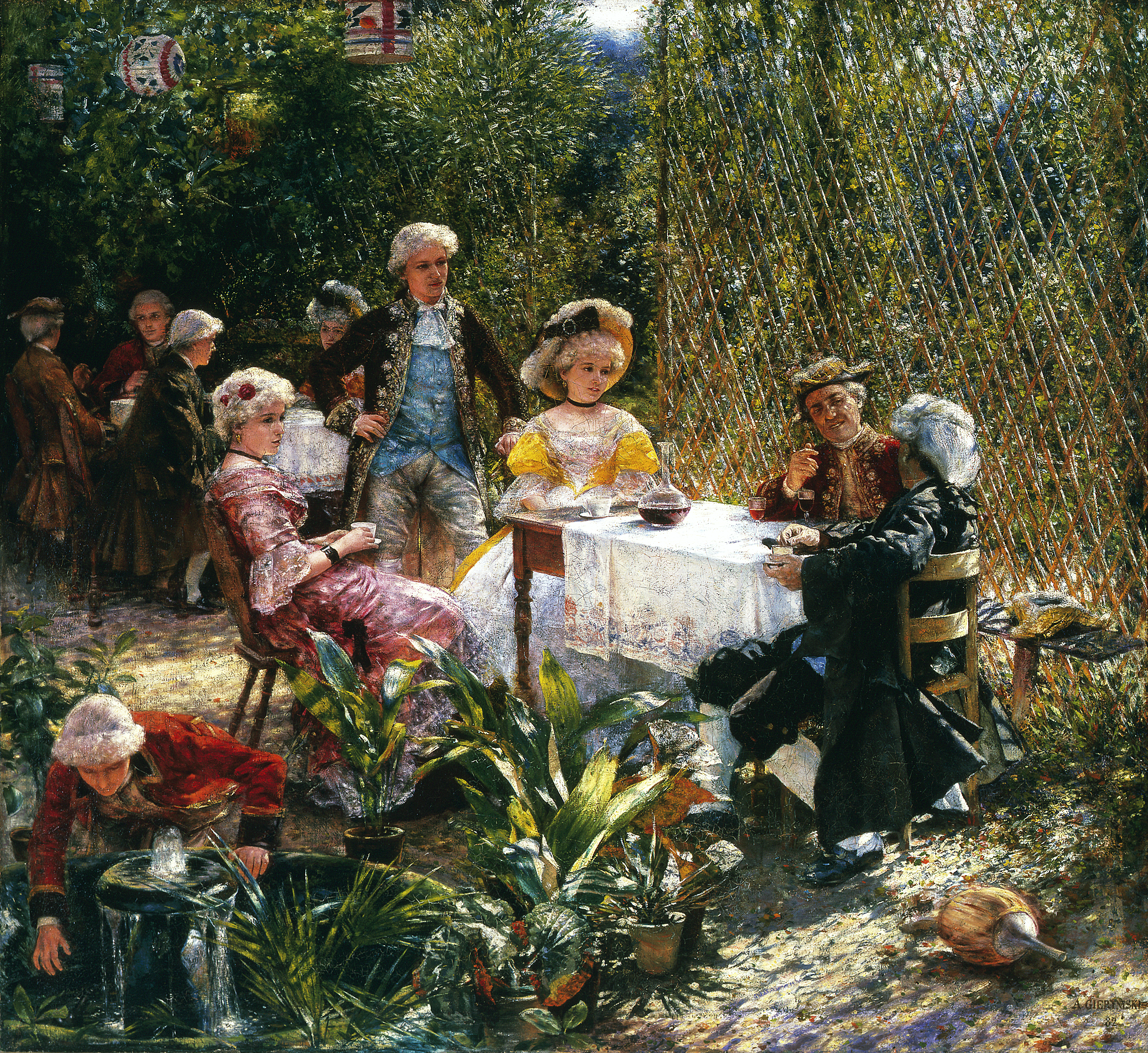
In the Arbour, 1882

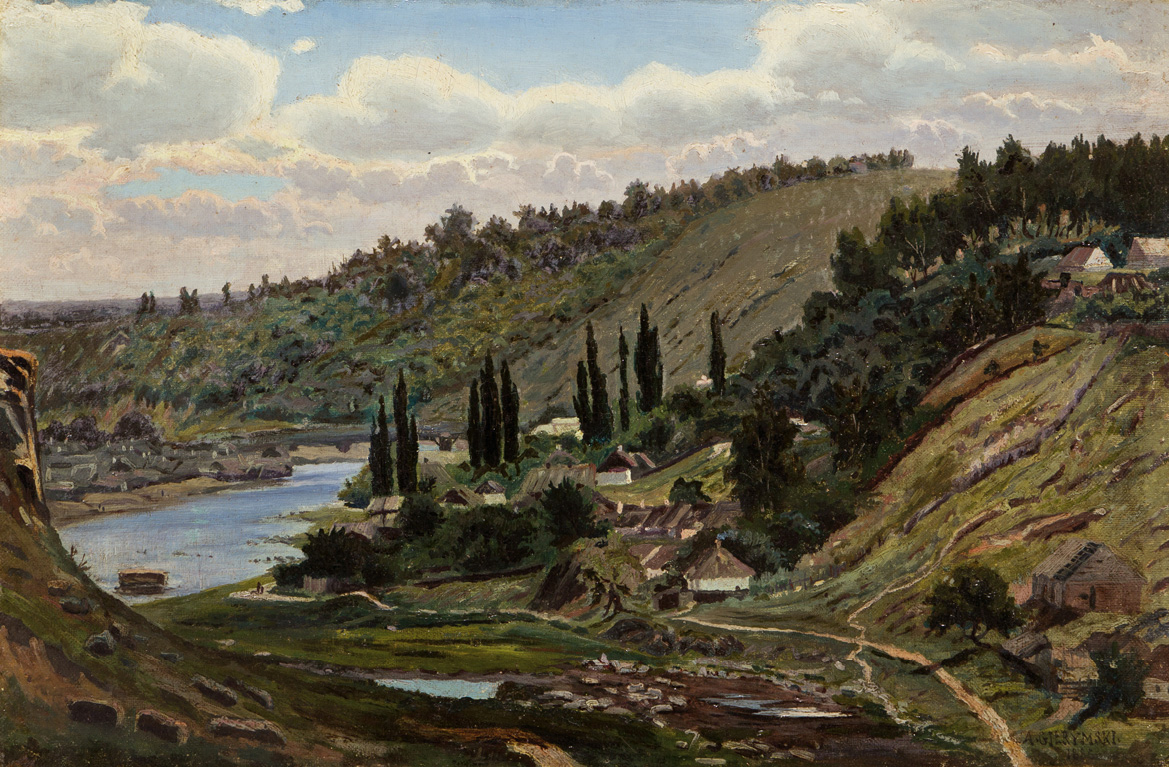
View from Ossiach Lake in Carinthia, 1886

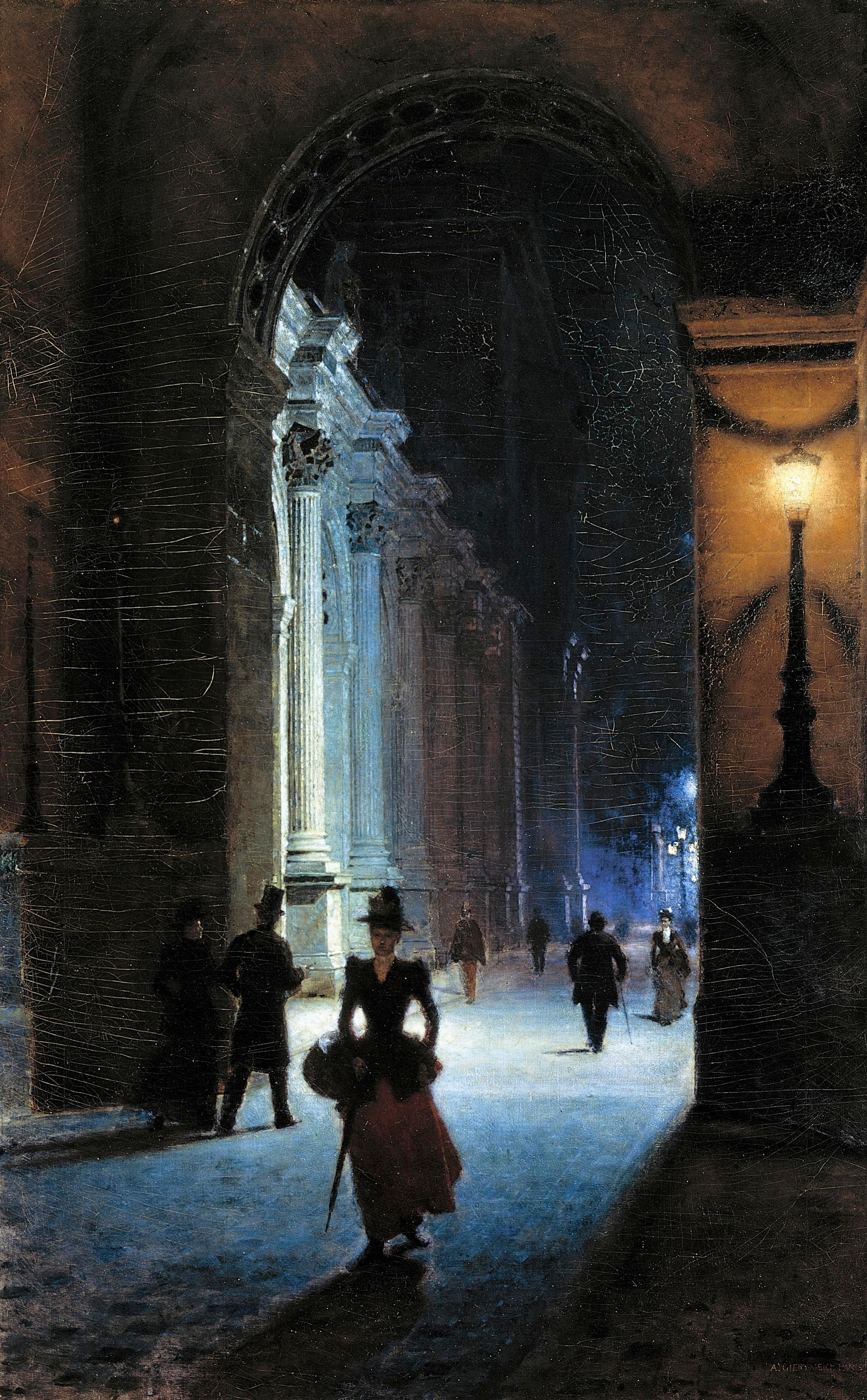
Louvre at Night, 1892

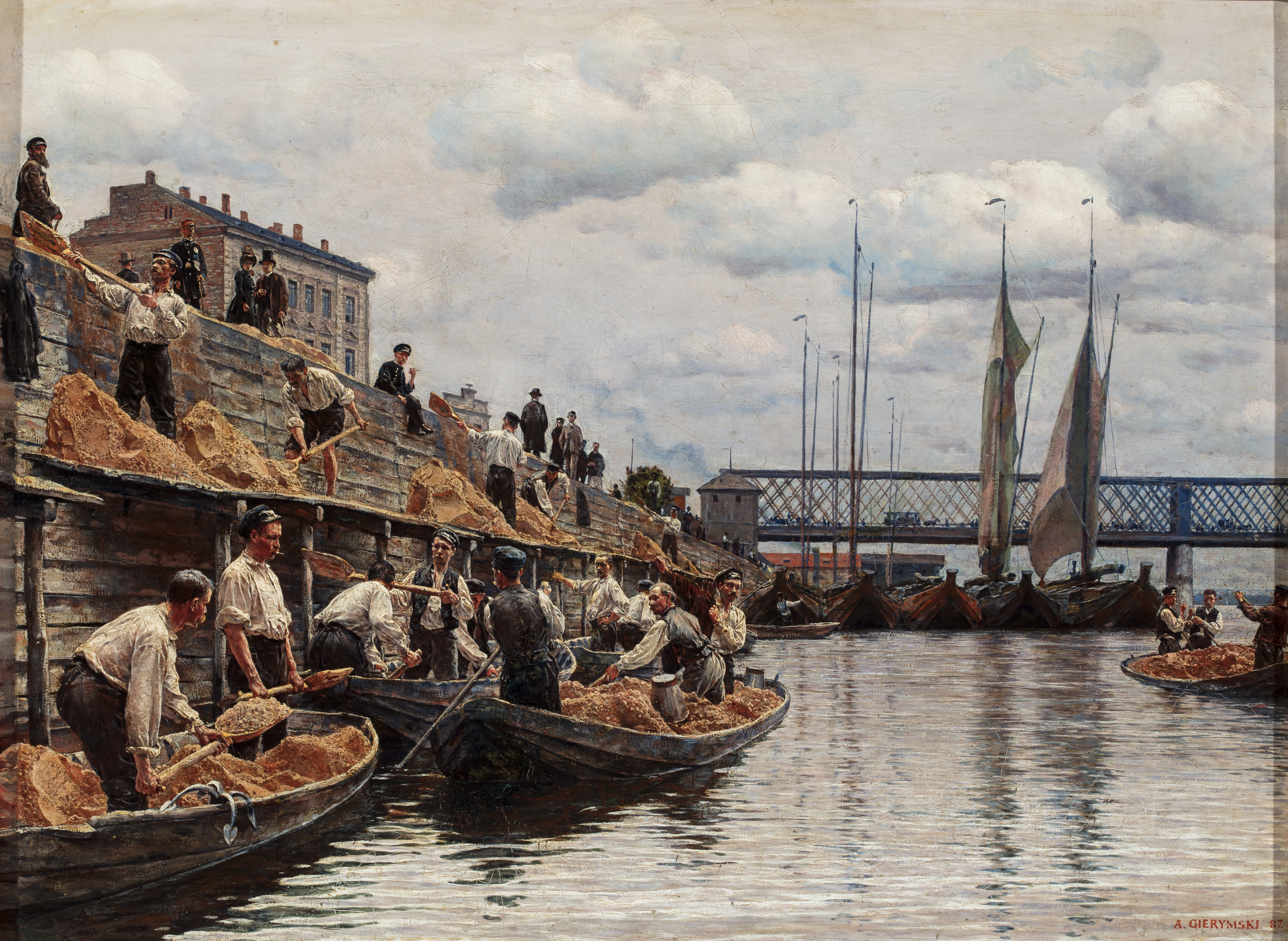
Sandblasters, 1887

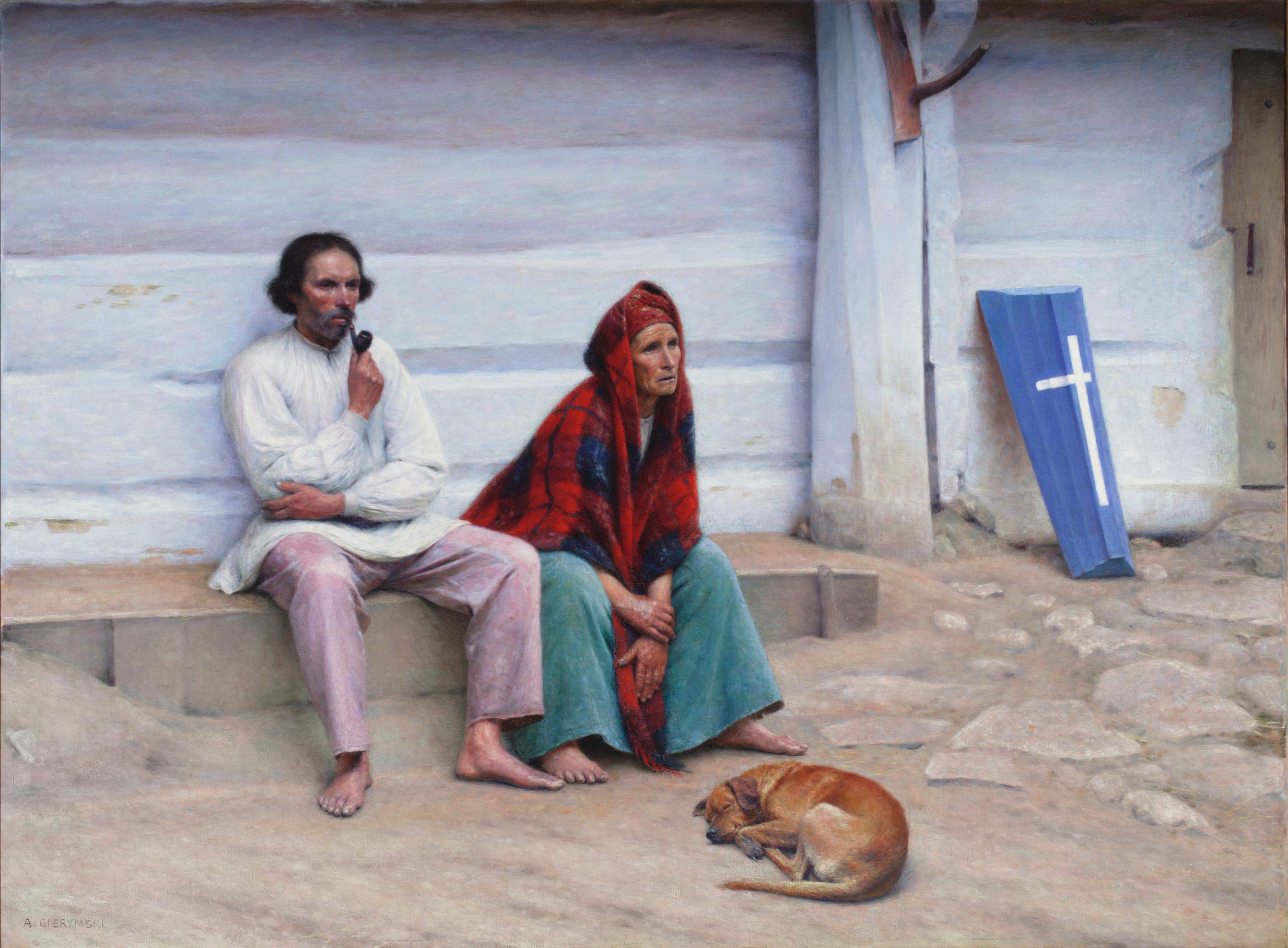
Peasant Coffin, 1894

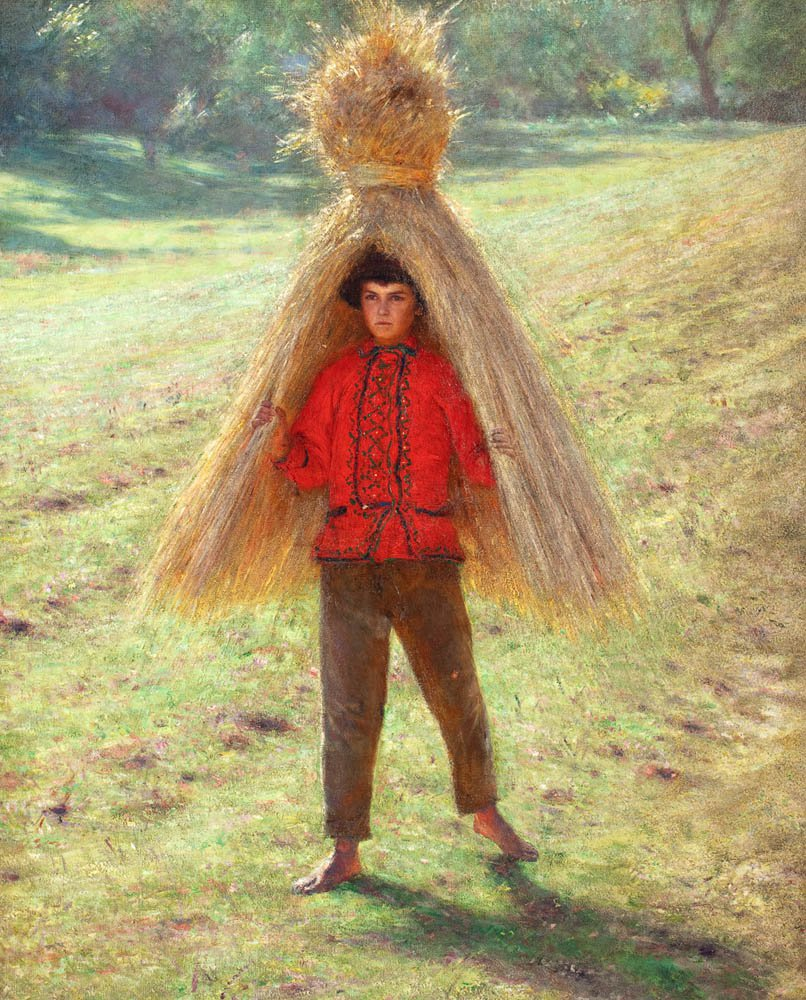
A Boy Carrying a Sheaf, 1895

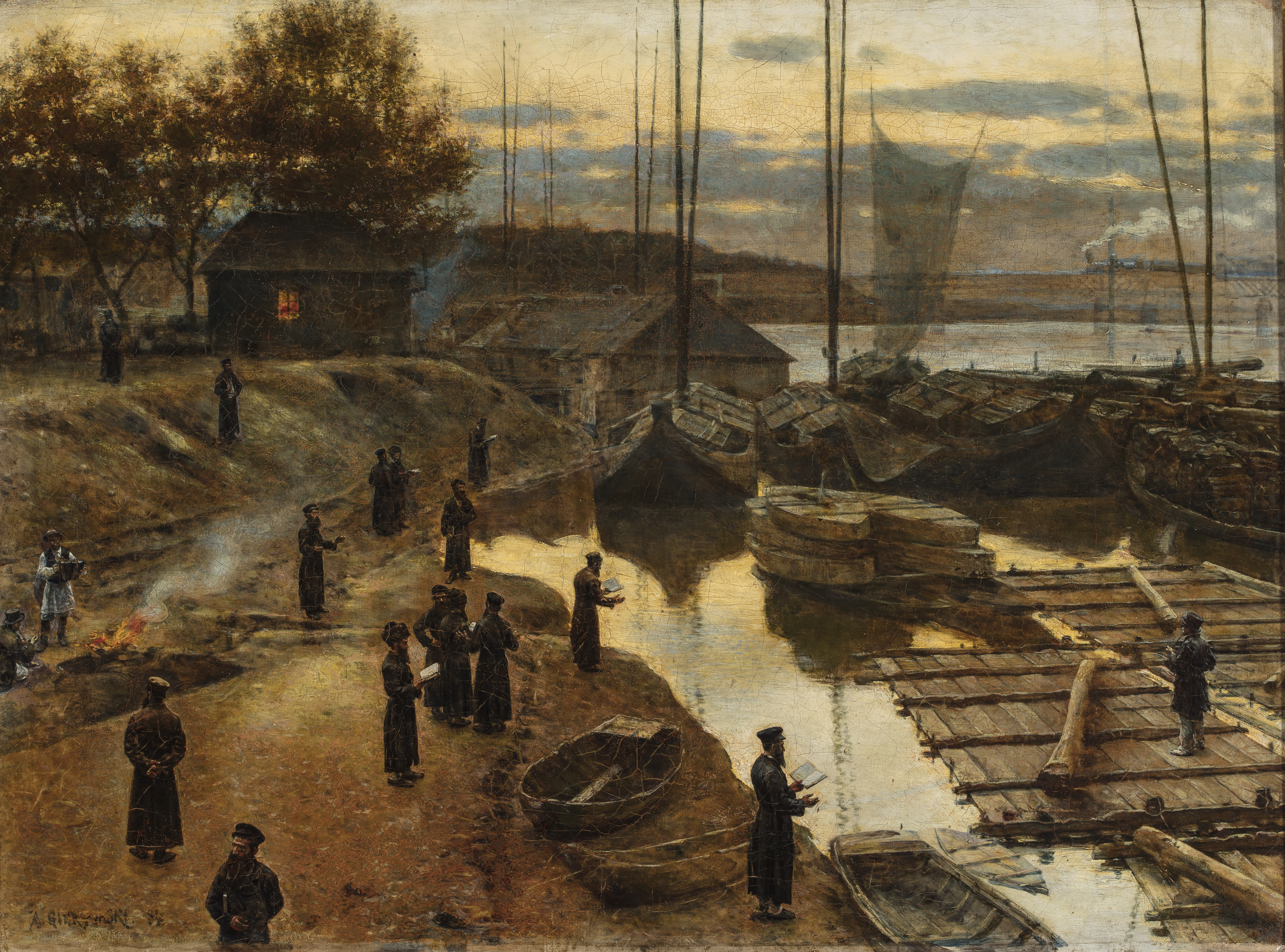
The Feast of Trumpets, 1884

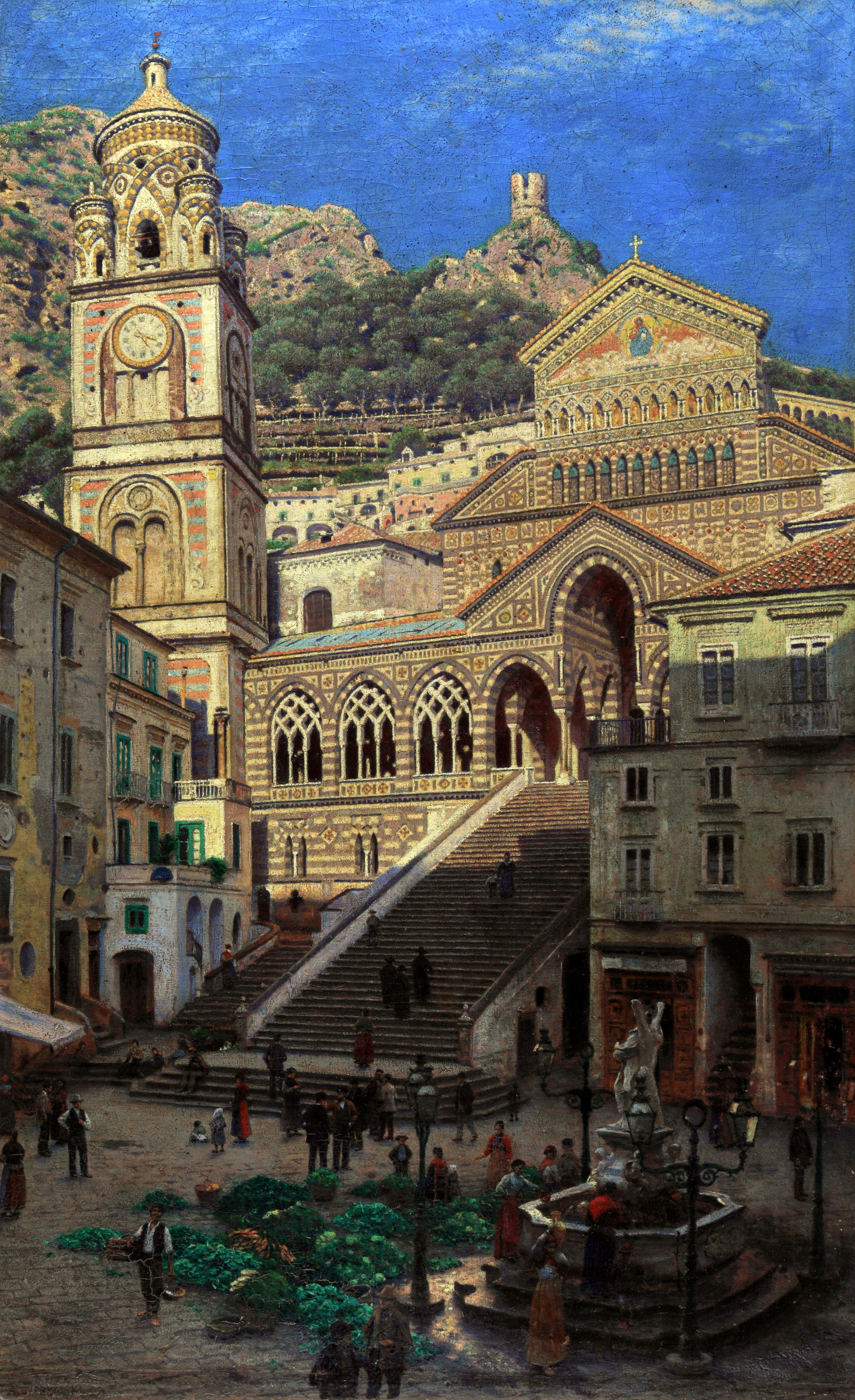
Amalfi Cathedral, 1897-1898

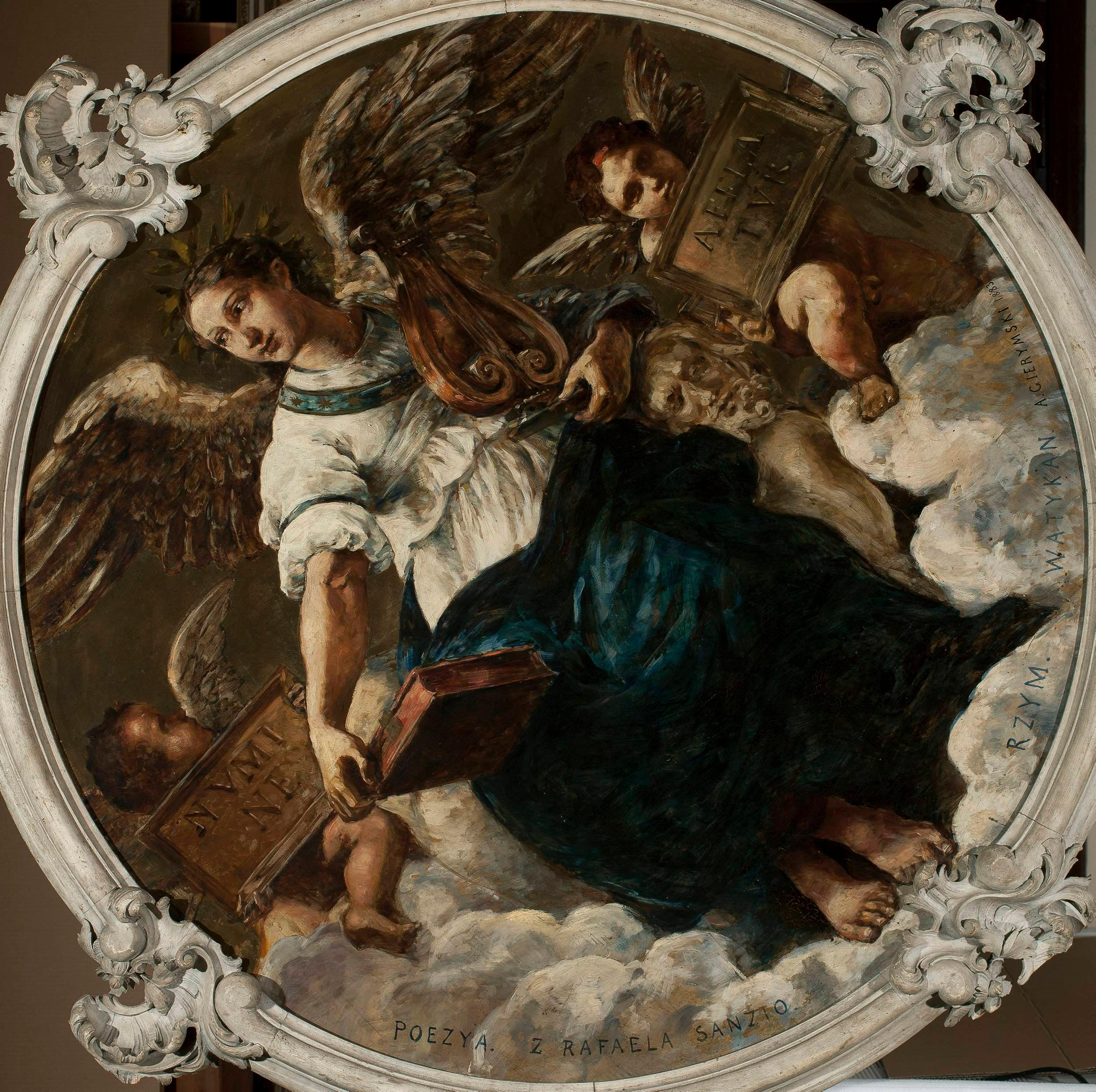
Poetry, 1883

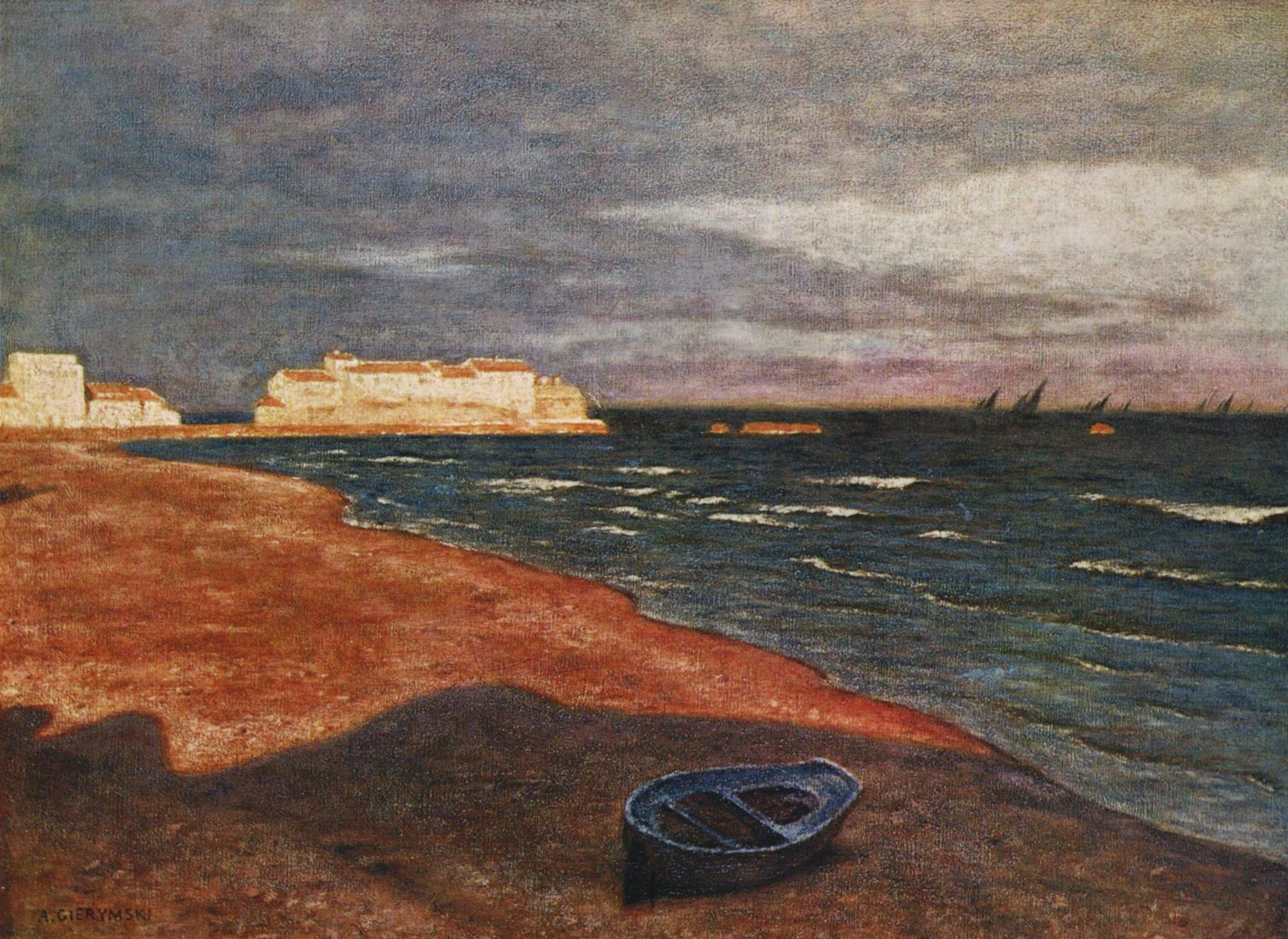
The Sea, 1891

== Major works ==
- Jewish Woman Selling Lemons (1881), Silesian Museum, Katowice, Poland
- Jewess with Oranges (1881), National Museum in Warsaw (stolen in 1944, found in Germany in 2010)
- In the Arbour (1882), The National Museum in Warsaw
- Powiśle (1883), National Museum in Kraków, Gallery of 19th Century Polish Art at Sukiennice
- Feast of Trumpets I (1884), The National Museum in Warsaw
- Sandblasters (1887), The National Museum in Warsaw
- Wittelsbach Square in Munich at night (1890), The National Museum in Warsaw
- Twilight over Seine (1892–1893), The National Museum in Kraków Gallery of 19th Century Polish Art at Sukiennice
- Peasant Coffin (1894–1895), The National Museum in Warsaw
- A boy carrying a sheaf (1895), National Museum in Wrocław
- Lake on the sunset (1900), private collection
- Stone Pine near Villa Borghese in Rome (1900), National Museum in Kraków, Gallery of 19th Century Polish Art st Sukiennice
- The Sea (1891), The National Museum in Warsaw

== See also ==
- List of Polish painters
