= Döhler =

German company

- Founded: 1838
- Founder: Lorenz Döhler
- Headquarters: Darmstadt, Germany
- Revenue: Unknown
- Number of employees: More than 9,500
- Website: www.doehler.com/en/

Döhler or Doehler, is a global producer, marketer and provider of technology-based natural ingredients and ingredient systems, i.e. food additives, for the food and beverage industries. Their product line ranges from flavours, colours, specialty & performance ingredients, cereal ingredients, dairy ingredients, fruit & vegetable ingredients, and ingredient systems.

Headquartered in Darmstadt, Germany, Döhler has 23 production and 24 application centres, 50 sales offices, and sales representation in over 130 countries. More than 5,000 employees provide integrated food & beverage solutes from concept to realisation.

Döhler was founded by Lorenz Döhler in 1838 as a spice mill in Erfurt.

In 2021, Döhler and Sacco System formed an alliance in the plant-based dairy alternatives to produce new dairy-free yogurts, cheeses and drinks.

In August 2023, it was announced that Döhler had acquired the Bangkok-headquartered flavor manufacturer, Boon Flavors.

== Subsidiary (Local) ==
- Darmstadt (Germany)
- Dahlenburg (Germany)
- Denizli (Türkiye)
- Dubai (United Arab Emirates)
- Eisleben (Germany)
- Istanbul (Türkiye)
- Izmir (Türkiye)
- Kyiv (Ukraine)
- Kozietuły Nowe, Mogielnica (Poland)
- Limeira, São Paulo (Brazil)
- Antônio Prado, Rio Grande do Sul (Brazil)
- Mexico City (Mexico)
- Moscow (Russia)
- Neuenkirchen (Germany)
- Neuss (Germany)
- Oosterhout (Netherlands)
- Prosser (United States)
- Pune (India)
- Rizhao (China)
- Roggel (Netherlands)
- Shanghai, China)
- Skala-Podilska (Ukraine)
- Paarl (South Africa)

=== Notes ===
Headquarters

== Products ==
Flavors, colors and ingredients for health

- Flavors
- Emulsions
- Flavor extracts
- Colored emulsions
- Color extracts and concentrates

Ingredients and ingredient systems

- fruit preparations
- Milk and soy bases
- Tea and coffee bases
- Malt and grain bases
- Alcohol-free fermented bases
- Alcohol-containing bases
- Sweeteners and acidifiers

Vegetable Fruits

- Concentrates
- purees
- Concentrated puree
- Special concentrates
- Grain concentrates (oats)
