= Kaplin =

Kaplin may refer to:

- Kaplin, Masovian Voivodeship, a village in Poland
- Kaplin, Greater Poland Voivodeship, a village in Poland

== See also ==
- Kaplon (disambiguation)
- Kapton, a polyimide film
