= Looting of Poland in World War II =

Looting of Poland in World War II

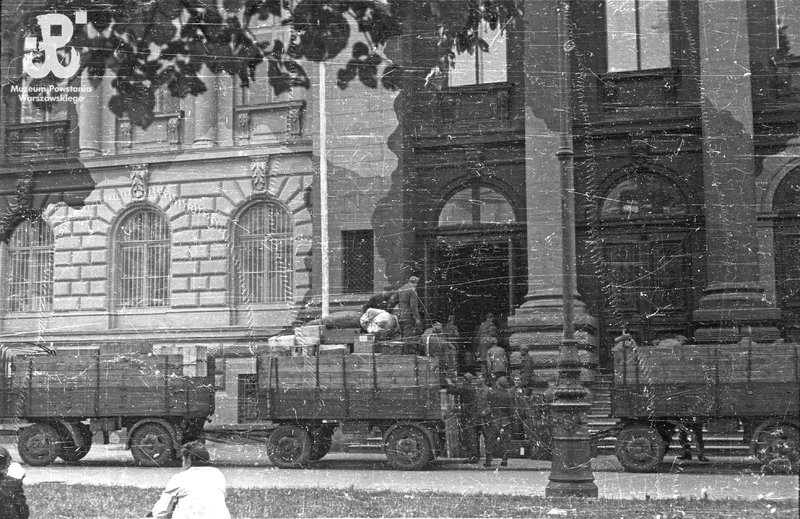
Germans looting the Zachęta Museum in Warsaw in the summer of 1944

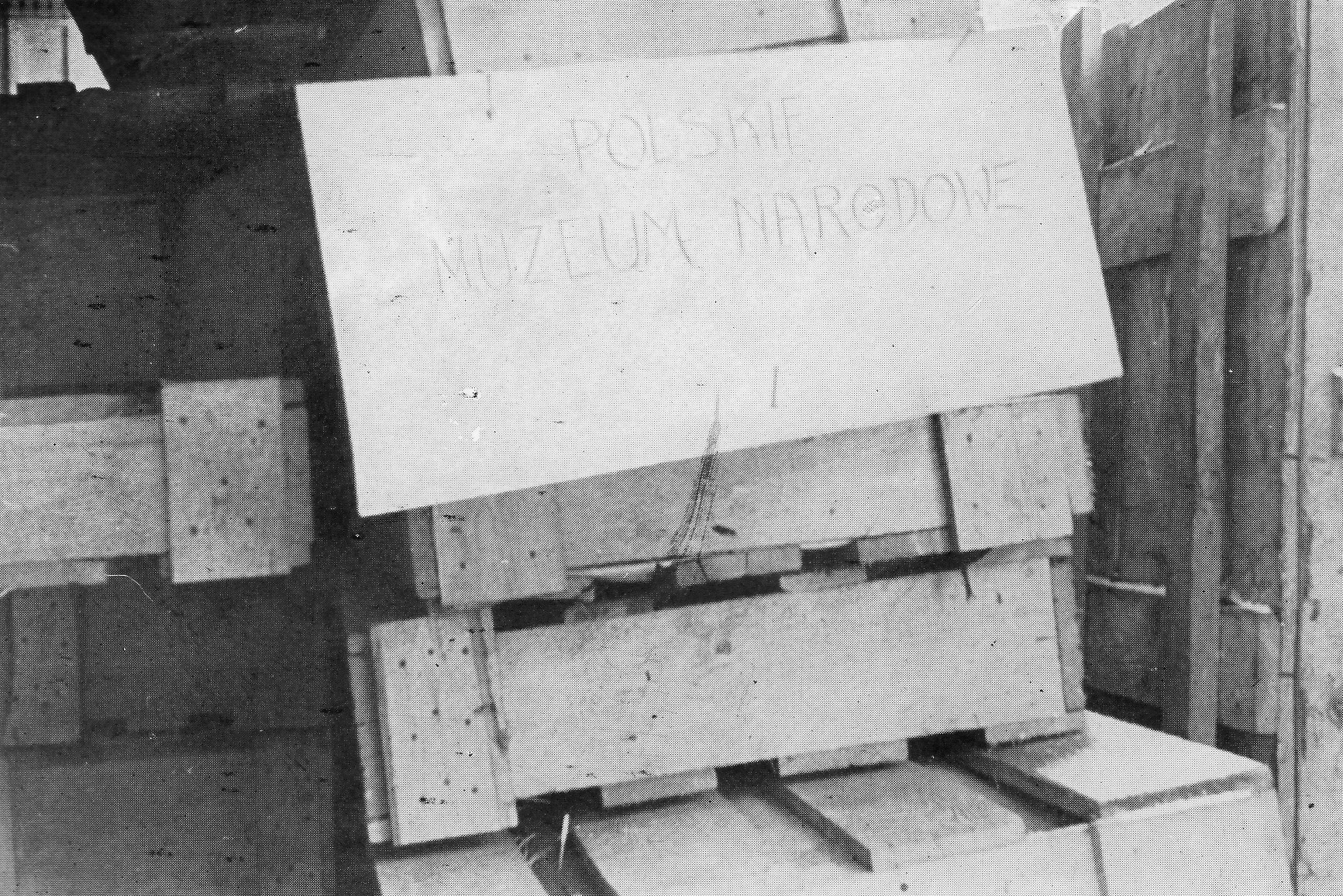
Crates from the National Museum in Kraków packed for shipment to Germany, 1942

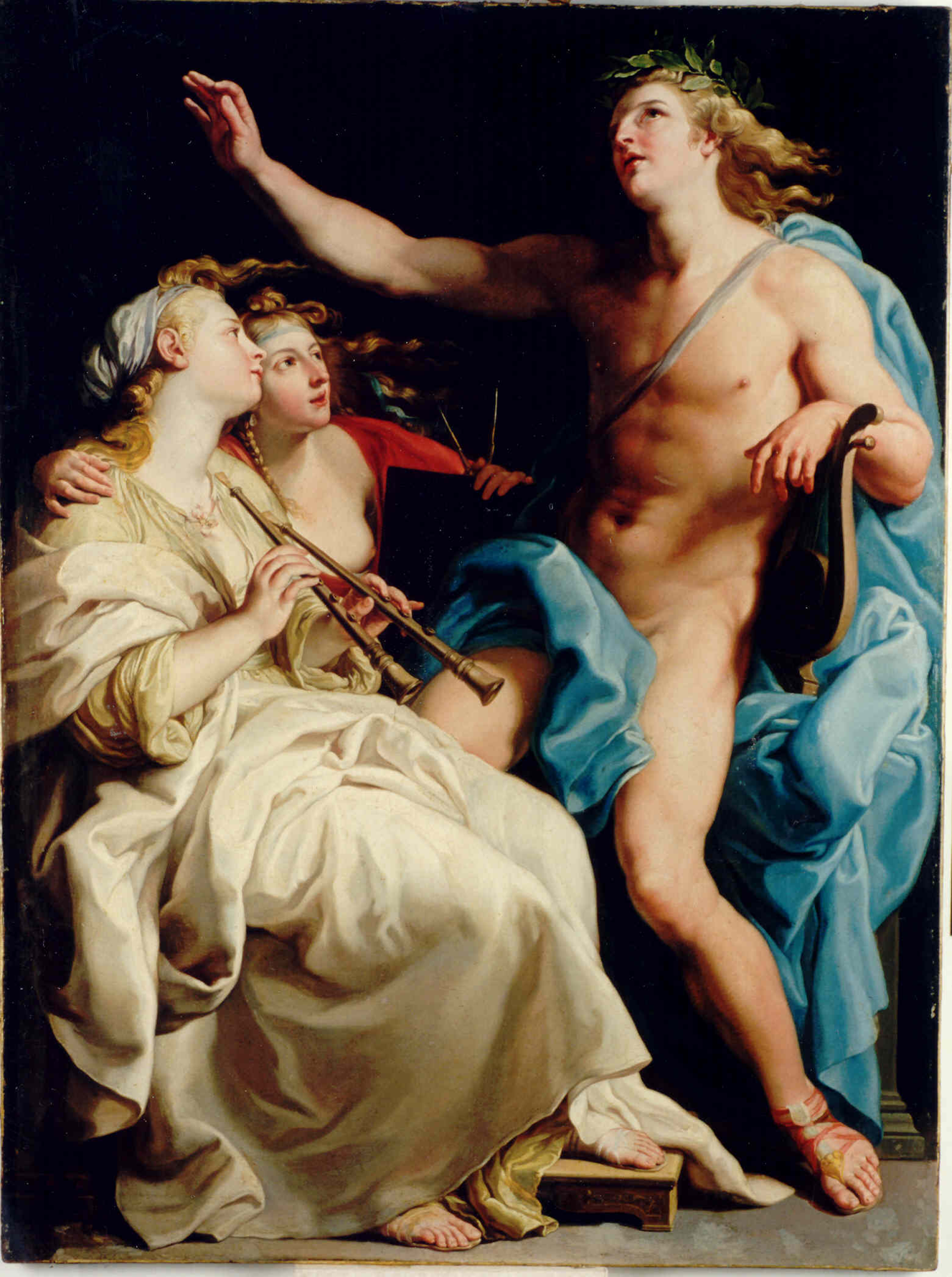
Pompeo Batoni's Apollo and Two Muses, stolen in 1944, returned to Poland in 1997

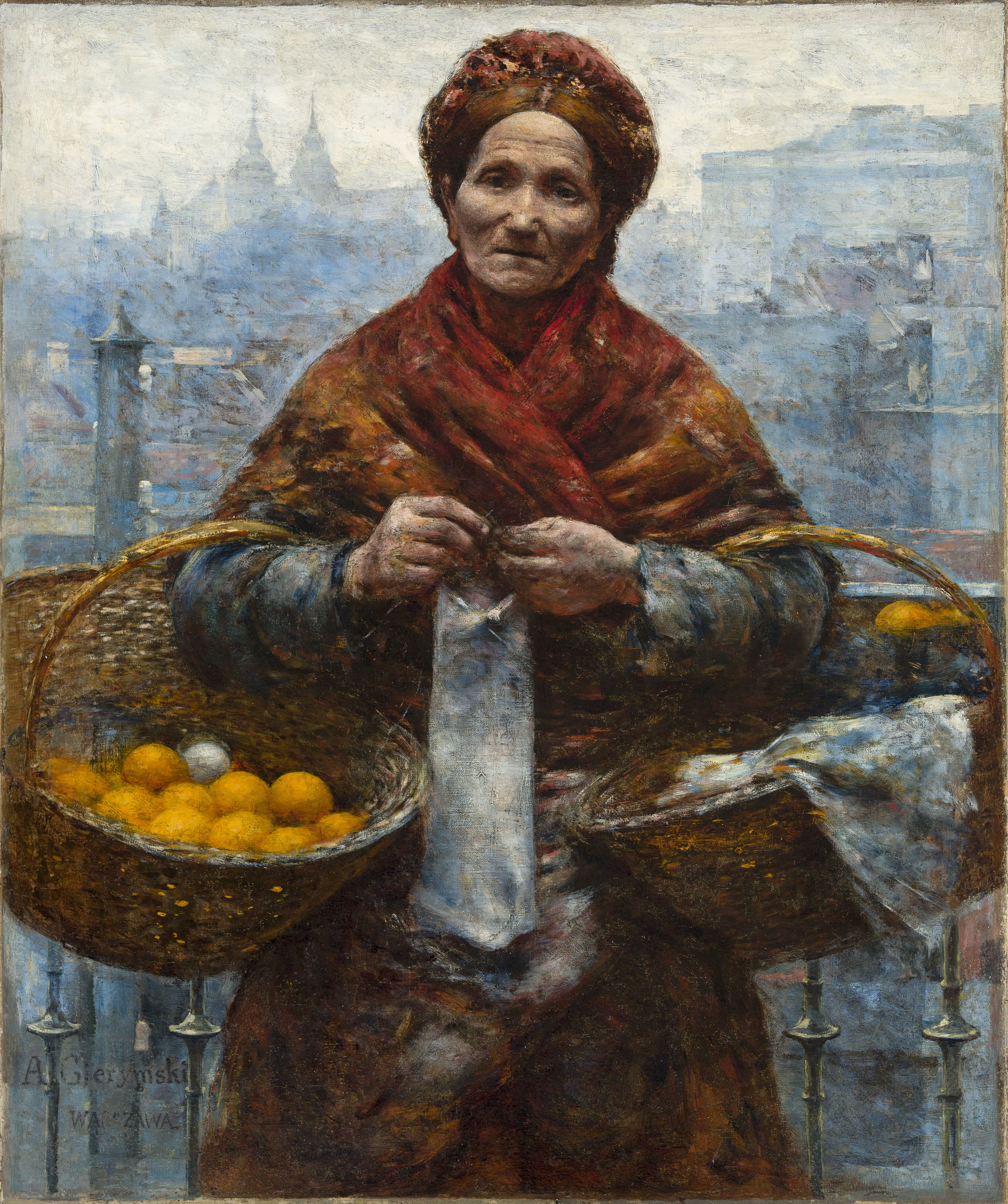
Aleksander Gierymski's Jewess with Oranges discovered on 26 November 2010 in an art auction in Buxtehude, Germany

Source: The Lost Museum by Ministry of Culture and National Heritage

The looting of Polish cultural artifacts and industrial infrastructure during World War II was carried out by Nazi Germany and the Soviet Union simultaneously after the invasion of Poland of 1939. A significant portion of Poland's cultural heritage, estimated at half a million art objects, was plundered by the occupying powers. Catalogued pieces are still occasionally recovered elsewhere in the world and returned to Poland.

Priceless items of art still considered missing or found in other museums include works by Bernardo Bellotto, Anna Bilińska-Bohdanowicz, Józef Brandt, Lucas Cranach the Elder, Lucas Cranach the Younger, Albrecht Dürer, Anthony van Dyck, Hans Holbein the Younger, Jacob Jordaens, Frans Luycx, Jacek Malczewski, Raphael, Rembrandt van Rijn, Peter Paul Rubens, Henryk Siemiradzki, Veit Stoss, Alfred Wierusz-Kowalski, Leon Wyczółkowski, Jan Matejko, Henri Gervex, Ludwig Buchhorn, Józef Simmler, Henri-Pierre Danloux, Jan Miense Molenaer and many others.

As part of its efforts to locate and retrieve the missing items of art, the Ministry of Culture and National Heritage established a Database of War Losses. As of 2013 it contained over 63,000 entries. The list, published by the Ministry is submitted to the National Institute of Museology and Collections Protection, to Polish embassies, and the Central Registry of Information on Looted Cultural Property 1933-1945 (lootedart.com). It is periodically sent to over 100 auction houses around the world. In addition, the Ministry has also established The Lost Museum website, a virtual museum containing historical photographs of the many art objects still missing.

== Background ==
At the beginning of the 1939 invasion of Poland, the Polish interwar government attempted to conceal the nation's most valued cultural heritage such as the royal treasures of the Wawel Castle in Kraków. The royal accessories including the Jagiellonian tapestries were secretly shipped to Western Europe and then to Canada among other places. At the end of the war, two parallel Polish governments, the Western-supported Polish government-in-exile and the Soviet-backed government in Communist Poland laid claims to these national treasures. The cultural artifacts were released by Canada to the People's Republic of Poland in February 1961.

== Nazi Germany ==
Following the German invasion of Poland in September 1939 and the occupation of Poland by German forces, the Nazi regime attempted to suppress Polish culture. As part of that process, the Nazis confiscated Polish national heritage assets and much private property. Acting on the legal decrees of October 19 and December 16 (Verordnung über die Beschlagnahme Kunstgegeständen im Generalgouvernement), several German agencies began the process of looting Polish museums and other collections, ostensibly considered necessary for the "securing" of German national interests.

Nazi plunder included private and public art collections, artefacts, precious metals, books, and personal possessions. Hitler and Göring in particular were interested in acquiring looted art treasures from occupied Europe, the former planning to use the stolen art to fill the galleries of the planned Führermuseum (Leader's Museum), and the latter for his personal collection. Göring, having stripped almost all of occupied Poland of its artworks within six months of Germany's invasion, ultimately grew a collection valued at over 50 million Reichsmarks.

Thousands of art objects were plundered, as the Nazis carried out a plan put in place before the start of hostilities. The looting was supervised by experts of the SS-Ahnenerbe, Einsatzgruppen units, who were responsible for art; and, by experts of Haupttreuhandstelle Ost, who were responsible for confiscating businesses and more mundane objects. Nazi officials responsible for carrying-out the plan included Hans Posse, Josef Mühlmann and his half-brother Kajetan (a.k.a. Kai, both from the SS), overseen by Dagobert Frey, an SS historian originally also from Austria, selected by Berlin to validate Poland as a "Teutonic land" without Jews. In addition to the official looting by Nazi authorities, some looting was also carried out by individuals acting on their own initiative; in fact Mühlmann complained as early as on October 6, 1939, that many items he was tasked to secure had already been moved or simply stolen. While the Nazis kept extensive documentation of newly acquired looted art pieces, the system was not foolproof, and they lost track of much of the looted goods during the increasingly haphazard German evacuation from Central and Eastern Europe in 1944.

Most of the important art in Polish public and private collections had been "secured" by the Nazis within six months of the 1939 invasion. By the end of 1942, German officials estimated that "over 90%" of the art previously in Poland was in their possession. Some art was shipped to German museums, such as the planned, Führermuseum in Linz, while other art became the private property of Nazi officials. In 1940, Hitler received a "gift" from Hans Frank, governor of occupied Poland - a collection, prepared by Mühlmann, of 521 items of the most valuable art. Frank aided by Oberführer Mühlmann, an art connoisseur, assembled a large collection of art from Polish collections. The total cost of the Nazi theft and destruction of Polish art is estimated at 11.14 billion dollars (value in 2001 dollars).

Over 516,000 individual items were taken. The exact number is uncertain since not all art was catalogued or registered, especially in private hands and much of the documentation was lost as well. An assessment of losses began already during World War II under the auspices of the Polish government in exile and the Polish Underground State. In 1944, Karol Estreicher published the first work on this subject, Cultural Losses of Poland in London. A 2010 estimate gave a figure of 75% as the percentage of cultural heritage lost by Poland during the war. The estimate covers both destroyed and lost cultural heritage. The looted art includes:

- 11,000 paintings by Polish painters
- 2,800 paintings by other European painters
- 1,400 sculptures
- 75,000 manuscripts
- 25,000 maps
- 22,000 books printed before 1800 (starodruki)
- 300,000 prints and works on paper
- hundreds of thousands of other items of artistic and historical value.

The number of looted or destroyed books is estimated at 1.5 million to as high as 15 or 22 million. Even exotic animals were taken from Polish zoos.

During the genocidal campaign against Polish Jews, culminating in the operation known as Aktion Reinhard of 1942, general extortion and mass looting became part of the Nazi German economic plan. It was not limited to the Nazi policy towards Poland's artistic heritage.

Robbery of Polish Jews and looting of their property became the norm. In every town and village, Jews were forced to hand over not merely gold, currency and other valuables, but virtually anything consumable, including furniture and clothing. Even items such as birdcages, door handles and hot-water bottles were looted. Any excuse, or none at all, became the pretext for extortion.

== The Soviet Union ==
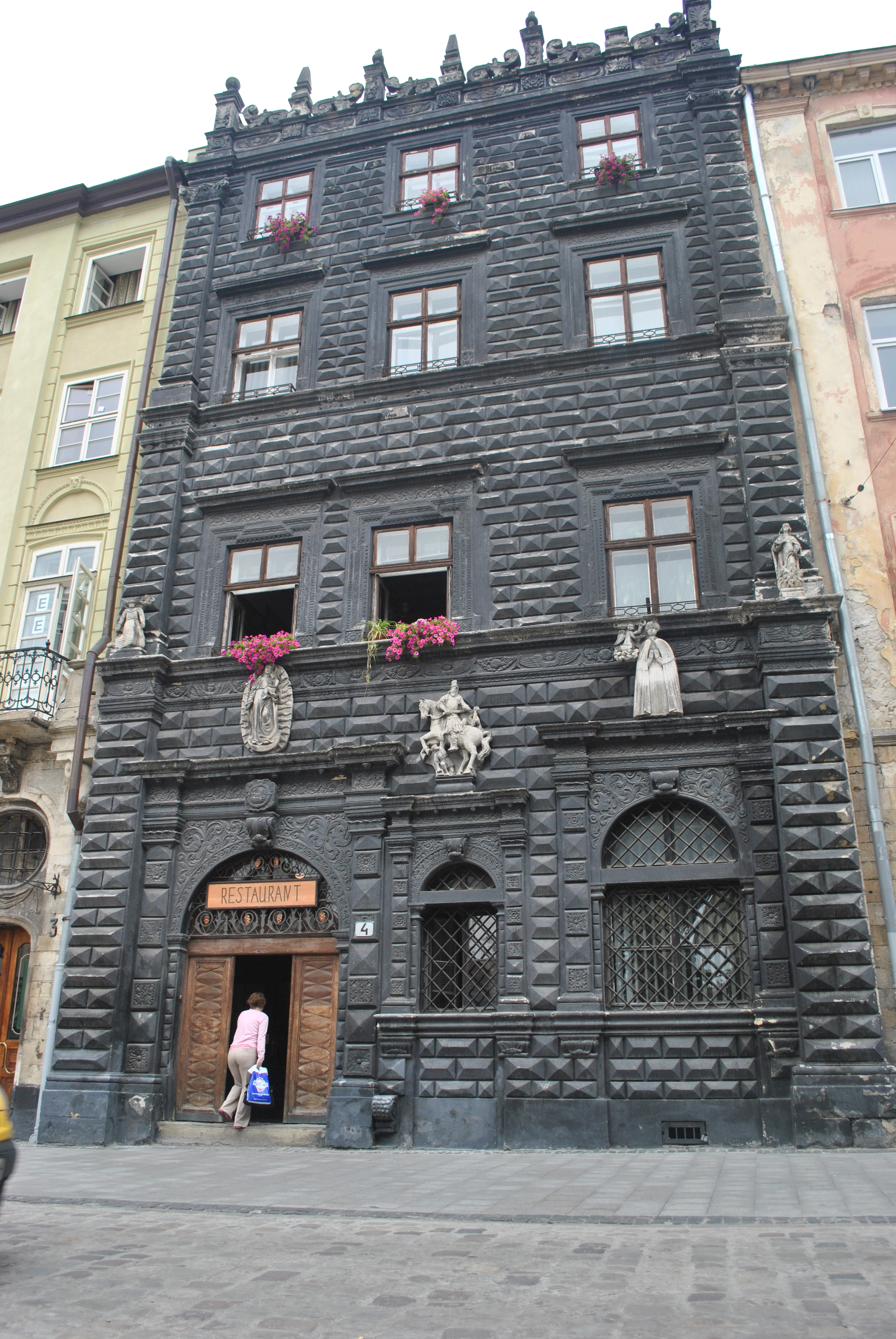
Holdings of Lwów Historical Museum were taken to the basement of Black House and destroyed behind closed doors.

After the Soviet Union invaded Poland on September 17, 1939, it likewise engaged in the looting and destruction of Poland's cultural heritage. It is estimated that soon after the invasion, about half of Polish museums and similar public institutions were dismantled in the territories occupied by the Soviets. Many items were shipped out to Soviet museums such as the Moscow Museum of History and the Central Anti-Religious Museum (also in Moscow). Other collections were simply destroyed. For instance, during the liquidation of the Poland's Lwów Historical Museum early in 1940, its holdings were taken to the basement of the Black House (Polish: Czarna Kamienica), away from public scrutiny, and systematically destroyed there.

Following the Soviet advance across German-occupied Polish territory, the looting and plunder of anything of value continued until 1947, even though these territories were in theory already assigned to its allied communist Poland. Soviet forces engaged in particularly extensive plunder in the former eastern territories of Germany that were later to be transferred to Poland, stripping them of any piece of equipment left behind by the fleeing/deported population. Even the Polish Communists felt uneasy about the scope of their crimes. In 1945, the future Chairman of the Polish Council of State, Gen. Aleksander Zawadzki, worried that "raping and looting by the Soviet army would provoke a civil war"

=== Industrial plunder ===
In early 1946 the operations of "war trophy brigades" were regulated by detailed orders issued by Soviet vice-minister of defence, Nikolai Bulganin. Until 1948 these brigades sent at least 239,000 railway carriages to the USSR transporting natural resources, complete factories and individual machines. The town of Bydgoszcz alone lost 30 complete factories and 250 ships. In Grudziądz the army confiscated all machinery from its factories, regardless of size. In Toruń all gristmills were taken, creating a temporary shortage of bread. Blachownia Śląska lost a large, German-built installation producing synthetic fuel, transported to the USSR in 10,000 train carriages. A similar production line in Police was transported in 14,000 rail carriages. Gliwice lost a pipe factory, Bobrek and Łabędy lost their iron furnaces. Complete power stations were dismantled and taken from Miechowice, Zabrze, Zdzieszowice, Mikulczyce, Blachownia Śląska and Chełmsk Śląski. Smaller industries were also confiscated in Sosnowiec, Dąbrowa Górnicza, Częstochowa, Zgoda, Chorzów, Siemianowice, Poznań, Bydgoszcz, Grudziądz, Toruń, Inowrocław, Włocławek, Chojnice, Łódź, Dziedzice and Oświęcim.

Farm animals were likewise targeted for looting: until 1 September 1945 the Red Army had confiscated 506,000 cows, 114,000 sheep and 206,000 horses. In February 1945 alone, over 72,000 tons of sugar were taken. In the Toruń region 14,000 tons of grain, 20,000 tons of potatoes and 21,000 tons of red beetroot were taken during this period. These numbers represent just the looting, since the Polish government also officially supplied food to the Red Army at that time, including 150,000 tons of grain, 250,000 tons of potatoes, 25,000 tons of meat and 100,000 tons of straw.

In addition, individual Red Army soldiers were allowed to send "war trophies" home, with the amount depending on their rank. The result was widespread looting of private homes taking valuables, including food, clothes, shoes, radios, jewellery, utensils, bicycles, and even ceramic toilet bowls. The unprecedented scale of individualised looting can be estimated from the example of the Russian town of Kursk, which received just 300 personal parcels from soldiers in January 1945 but in May their number had reached 87,000.

After such transports ended, the Red Army started looting the railway infrastructure, rolling-stock repair yards, signalling installations and rails: around 5,500 km of rails were looted.

In 1946 the Polish authorities estimated the scale of plunder to the value of 2.375 billions of 1938 dollars (equivalent of $54 billion in 2015 dollars).

== Efforts to locate and reclaim looted art ==
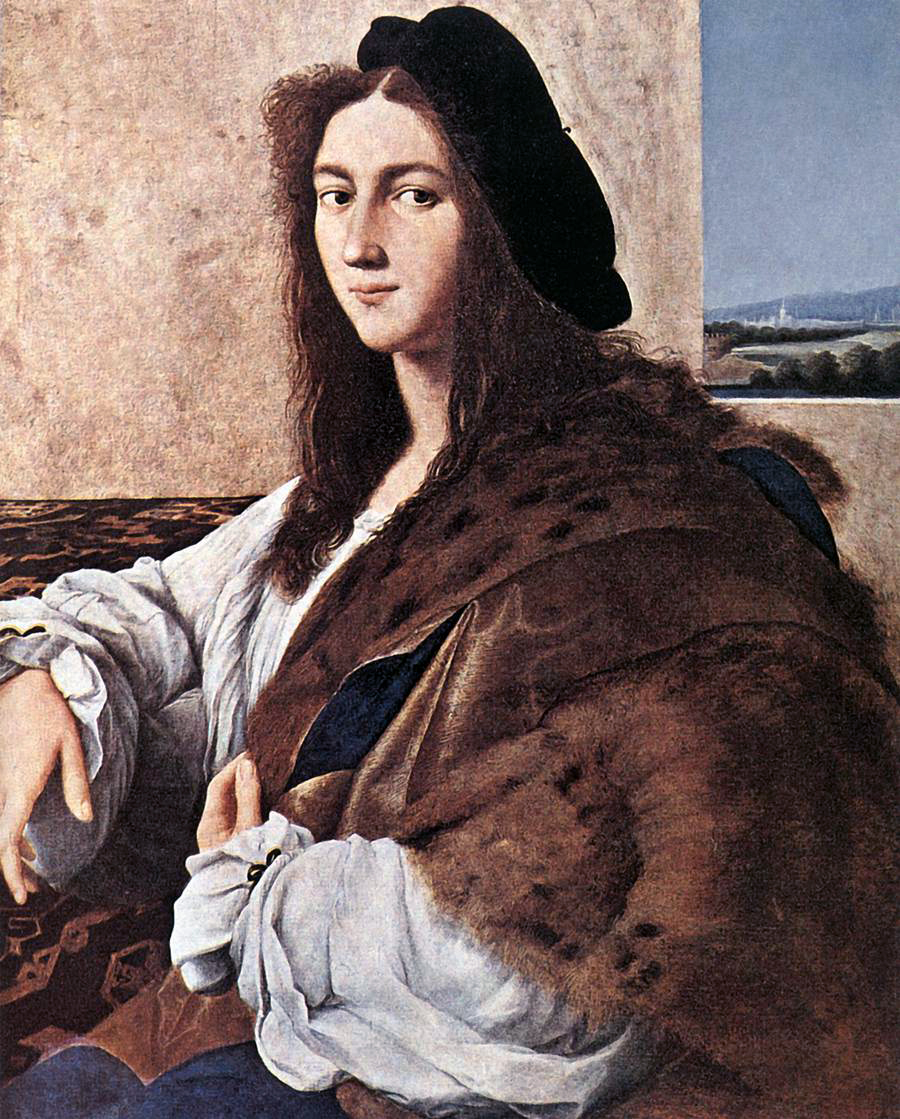
Raphael's Portrait of a Young Man which still hasn't been found (2025)

After the war, the Polish Ministry of Culture and Art took over efforts to compile a list of items of lost art, to locate and recover it. The Bureau of Revindication and Damages (Biuro Rewindykacji i Odszkodowań) operated from 1945 to 1951. The realities of the Cold War made retrieval of looted cultural heritage difficult, and it was only in the 1980s and 1990s that the situation changed. In 1991, a new body was formed for that purpose, the Bureau of the Government Representative for Polish Cultural Heritage Abroad (Biuro Pełnomocnika Rządu ds. Polskiego Dziedzictwa Kulturalnego Za Granicą), operating at the Ministry of Culture and Art. In 1999, the initiative received support from the Polish Ministry of Foreign Affairs. Once a looted piece of art is located, the Polish government issues a request for its restitution, and as noted on the Ministry website, all requests to date have been successful. As of October 2012, the Ministry has listed 30 prized objects which had been retrieved between 2001 and 2012. Among the recovered art is Aleksander Gierymski's painting of the Jewish Woman, found unexpectedly at the Eva Aldag auction house in Buxtehude in November 2010. It was returned to the National Museum, Warsaw at the end of July 2011 and restored.

On 1 August 2012, the Polish Ministry of Foreign Affairs announced that one of the most famous pieces of missing art from a Polish collection, Raphael's painting Portrait of a Young Man, had been found "in a bank vault in an undisclosed location". A ministry spokesman was confident that the painting would eventually be returned to Poland. In April 2014, Francesco Guardi's Palace Stairs was recovered.

Currently, Poland is planning to build a virtual museum, the Lost Museum (Muzeum Utracone), to expose the items of lost art.

Both Germany and the countries of the former Soviet Union still retain much Polish material looted during World War II. Recovering looted art from the former states of the Soviet Union, such as Russia, is proving particularly difficult.
