= Główczyn =

Główczyn may refer to the following places:

- Główczyn, Kuyavian-Pomeranian Voivodeship (north-central Poland)
- Główczyn, Grójec County in Masovian Voivodeship (east-central Poland)
- Główczyn, Płock County in Masovian Voivodeship (east-central Poland)
- Główczyn, Greater Poland Voivodeship (west-central Poland)
