= Cegielnia, Grójec County =

Cegielnia
- Village
- Location within Poland
- Coordinates: 51°40′58″N 20°41′49″E
- Country: Poland
- Voivodeship: Masovian
- County: Grójec
- Gmina: Mogielnica

Cegielnia [t͡sɛˈɡʲɛlɲa] is a village in the administrative district of Gmina Mogielnica, within Grójec County, Masovian Voivodeship, in east-central Poland.

In 1975-1998 the village belonged to the province of Radom.
