= Pawłowice, Grójec County =

Pawłowice
- Village
- Location within Poland
- Coordinates: 51°42′22″N 20°39′58″E
- Country: Poland
- Voivodeship: Masovian
- County: Grójec
- Gmina: Mogielnica

Pawłowice [pavwɔˈvit͡sɛ] is a village in the administrative district of Gmina Mogielnica, within Grójec County, Masovian Voivodeship, in east-central Poland.
