= Odcinki Dylewskie =

- Village
- Location within Poland
- Coordinates: 51°42′45″N 20°45′40″E
- Country: Poland
- Voivodeship: Masovian
- County: Grójec
- Gmina: Mogielnica

Odcinki Dylewskie [ɔtˈt͡ɕiŋki dɨˈlɛfskʲɛ] is a village in the administrative district of Gmina Mogielnica, within Grójec County, Masovian Voivodeship, in east-central Poland.
