= Kozietuły =

- Village
- Location within Poland
- Coordinates: 51°45′4″N 20°45′50″E
- Country: Poland
- Voivodeship: Masovian
- County: Grójec
- Gmina: Mogielnica

Kozietuły [kɔʑɛˈtuwɨ] is a village in the administrative district of Gmina Mogielnica, within Grójec County, Masovian Voivodeship, in east-central Poland.
