= Wodziczna, Masovian Voivodeship =

Wodziczna
- Village
- Location within Poland
- Coordinates: 51°43′25″N 20°43′54″E
- Country: Poland
- Voivodeship: Masovian
- County: Grójec
- Gmina: Mogielnica

Wodziczna [vɔˈd͡ʑit͡ʂna] is a village in the administrative district of Gmina Mogielnica, within Grójec County, Masovian Voivodeship, in east-central Poland.
