= Kaplon =

Kaplon may refer to:

- Kaplon (chieftain), a Hungarian tribal chieftain
- Kaplon (genus), a gens (clan) in the Kingdom of Hungary

== See also ==
- Kaplin (disambiguation)
- Kapton, a polyimide film
