= Główczyn-Towarzystwo =

Village in Gmina Mogielnica, Poland

- Village
- Location within Poland
- Coordinates: 51°43′46″N 20°41′42″E
- Country: Poland
- Voivodeship: Masovian
- County: Grójec
- Gmina: Mogielnica

Główczyn-Towarzystwo [ˈɡwuft͡ʂɨn tɔvaˈʐɨstfɔ] is a village in the administrative district of Gmina Mogielnica, within Grójec County, Masovian Voivodeship, in east-central Poland.
