= Brzostowiec =

- Village
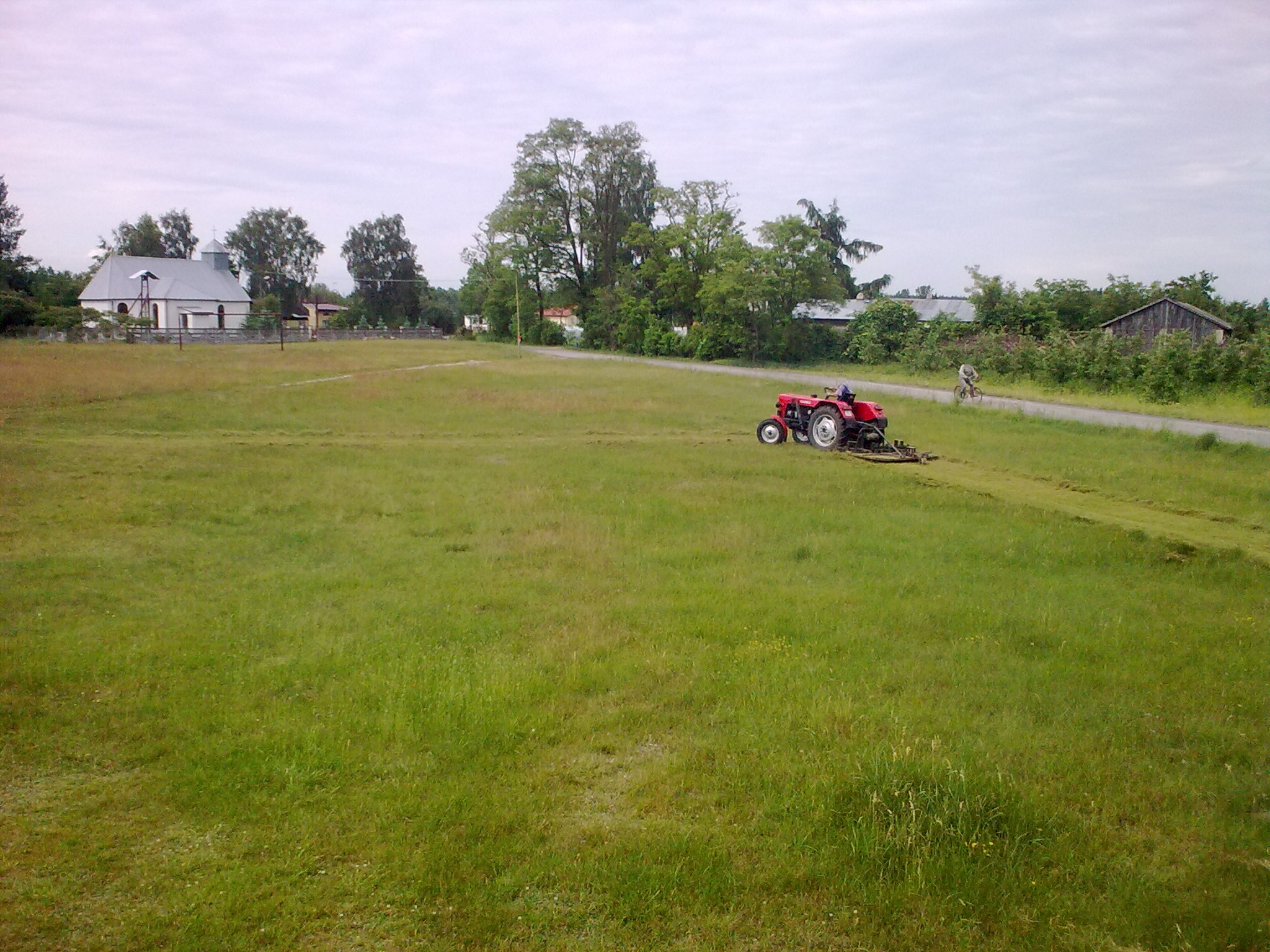

- Location within Poland
- Coordinates: 51°39′13″N 20°39′13″E
- Country: Poland
- Voivodeship: Masovian
- County: Grójec
- Gmina: Mogielnica
- Time zone: UTC+1 (CET)
  - Summer (DST): UTC+2 (CEST)
- Vehicle registration: WGR

Brzostowiec [bʐɔsˈtɔvjɛt͡s] is a village in the administrative district of Gmina Mogielnica, within Grójec County, Masovian Voivodeship, in east-central Poland.

== History ==
In the early modern period, a trade route connecting Warsaw and Kraków ran through the village. It was one of the busiest routes in Poland.
