= Dębnowola, Gmina Mogielnica =

Dębnowola
- Village
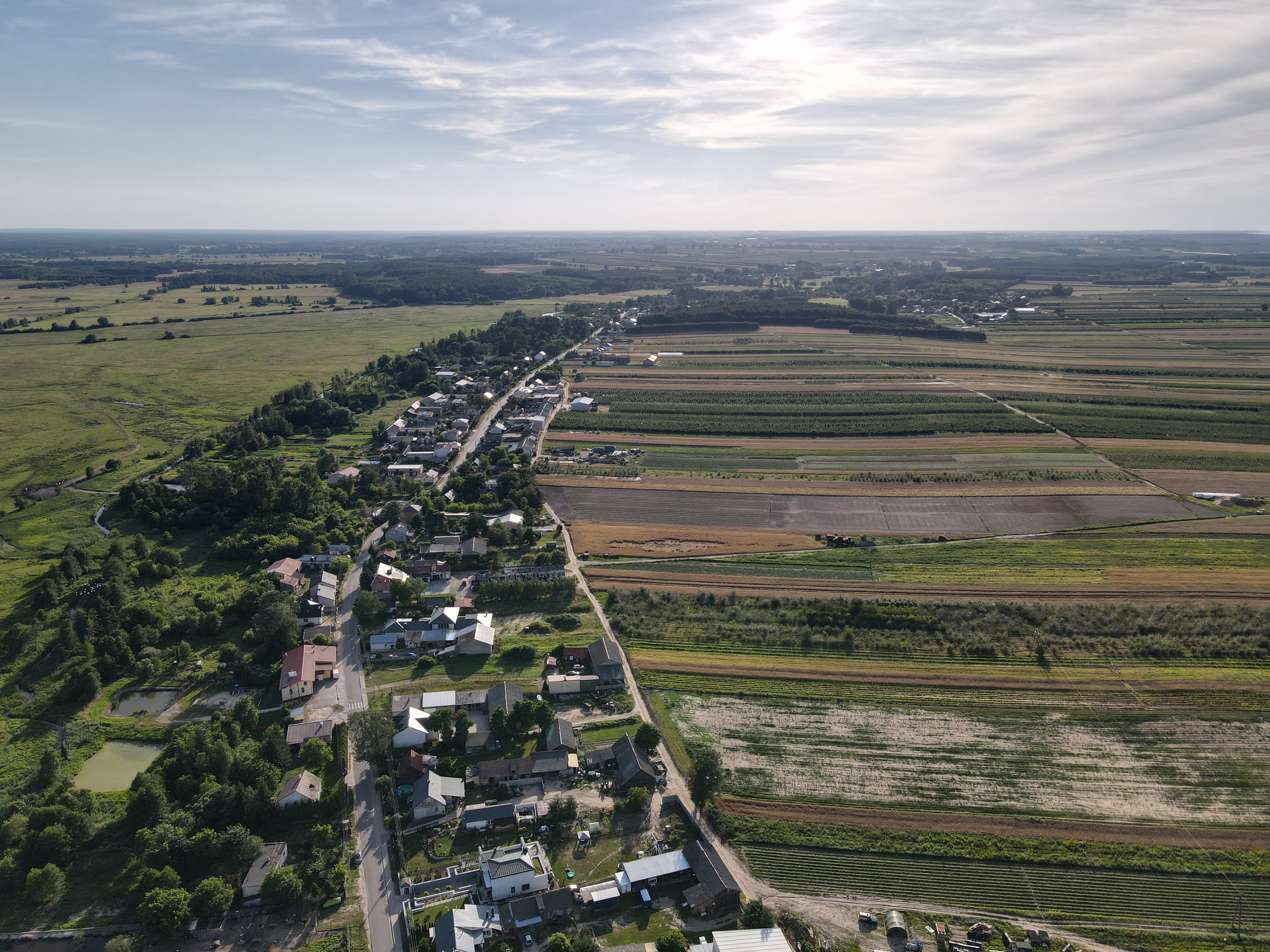

- Location within Poland
- Coordinates: 51°39′08″N 20°48′15″E
- Country: Poland
- Voivodeship: Masovian
- County: Grójec
- Gmina: Mogielnica

Dębnowola [dɛmbnɔˈvɔla] is a village in the administrative district of Gmina Mogielnica, within Grójec County, Masovian Voivodeship, in east-central Poland.
