= Borowe, Gmina Mogielnica =

Borowe
- Village
- Location within Poland
- Coordinates: 51°39′8″N 20°47′1″E
- Country: Poland
- Voivodeship: Masovian
- County: Grójec
- Gmina: Mogielnica

Borowe [bɔˈrɔvɛ] is a village in the administrative district of Gmina Mogielnica, within Grójec County, Masovian Voivodeship, in east-central Poland.
