= Dylew, Masovian Voivodeship =

Dylew
- Village
- Location within Poland
- Coordinates: 51°42′N 20°47′E
- Country: Poland
- Voivodeship: Masovian
- County: Grójec
- Gmina: Mogielnica

Dylew [ˈdɨlɛf] is a village in the administrative district of Gmina Mogielnica, within Grójec County, Masovian Voivodeship, in east-central Poland.
