= Gracjanów =

- Village
- Location within Poland
- Coordinates: 51°41′45″N 20°46′21″E
- Country: Poland
- Voivodeship: Masovian
- County: Grójec
- Gmina: Mogielnica

Gracjanów (Polish pronunciation: [ɡraˈt͡sjanuf]) is a village in the administrative district of Gmina Mogielnica, within Grójec County, Masovian Voivodeship, in east-central Poland.
