= Ługowice =

- Village
- Location within Poland
- Coordinates: 51°39′N 20°40′E
- Country: Poland
- Voivodeship: Masovian
- County: Grójec
- Gmina: Mogielnica
- Population (approx.): 200

Ługowice [wuɡɔˈvit͡sɛ] is a village in the administrative district of Gmina Mogielnica, within Grójec County, Masovian Voivodeship, in east-central Poland.
