= Wólka Gostomska =

- Village
- Location within Poland
- Coordinates: 51°39′N 20°39′E
- Country: Poland
- Voivodeship: Masovian
- County: Grójec
- Gmina: Mogielnica

Wólka Gostomska [ˈvulka ɡɔsˈtɔmska] is a village in the administrative district of Gmina Mogielnica, within Grójec County, Masovian Voivodeship, in east-central Poland.
