= Pączew =

Village in Gmina Mogielnica, Poland

- Village
- Location within Poland
- Coordinates: 51°39′23″N 20°37′49″E
- Country: Poland
- Voivodeship: Masovian
- County: Grójec
- Gmina: Mogielnica

Pączew [ˈpɔnt͡ʂɛf] is a village in the administrative district of Gmina Mogielnica, within Grójec County, Masovian Voivodeship, in east-central Poland.
