= Gmina Mogielnica =

Gmina Mogielnica Mogielnica Commune
- Gmina
- Coat of arms
- Interactive map of Gmina Mogielnica
- Coordinates (Mogielnica): 51°41′23″N 20°43′23″E
- Country: Poland
- Voivodeship: Masovian
- County: Grójec
- Seat: Mogielnica

Area
  - Total: 141.56 km^{2} (54.66 sq mi)

Population (2006)
  - Total: 9,127
  - Density: 64.47/km^{2} (167.0/sq mi)
  - Urban: 2,461
  - Rural: 6,666
- Website: http://www.mogielnica.pl/

Gmina Mogielnica is an urban-rural gmina (administrative district) in Grójec County, Masovian Voivodeship, in east-central Poland. Its seat is the town of Mogielnica, which lies approximately 22 kilometres (14 mi) south-west of Grójec and 62 km (39 mi) south of Warsaw.

The gmina covers an area of 141.56 square kilometres (54.7 sq mi), and as of 2006 its total population is 9,127 (out of which the population of Mogielnica amounts to 2,461, and the population of the rural part of the gmina is 6,666).

== Villages ==
Apart from the town of Mogielnica, Gmina Mogielnica contains the villages and settlements of Borowe, Brzostowiec, Cegielnia, Dąbrowa, Dalboszek, Dębnowola, Dobiecin, Dylew, Dziarnów, Dziunin, Główczyn, Główczyn-Towarzystwo, Górki-Izabelin, Gracjanów, Jastrzębia, Jastrzębia Stara, Kaplin, Kozietuły, Kozietuły Nowe, Ługowice, Marysin, Michałowice, Miechowice, Odcinki Dylewskie, Otaląż, Otalążka, Pączew, Pawłowice, Popowice, Ślepowola, Stamirowice, Stryków, Świdno, Tomczyce, Ulaski Gostomskie, Wężowiec, Wodziczna and Wólka Gostomska.

== Neighbouring gminas ==
Gmina Mogielnica is bordered by the gminas of Belsk Duży, Błędów, Goszczyn, Nowe Miasto nad Pilicą, Promna, Sadkowice and Wyśmierzyce.
