= Dąbrowa, Gmina Mogielnica =

Dąbrowa
- Village
- Location within Poland
- Coordinates: 51°41′22″N 20°39′41″E
- Country: Poland
- Voivodeship: Masovian
- County: Grójec
- Gmina: Mogielnica

Dąbrowa [dɔmˈbrɔva] is a village in the administrative district of Gmina Mogielnica, within Grójec County, Masovian Voivodeship, in east-central Poland.
