= Tomczyce, Gmina Mogielnica =

Tomczyce
- Village
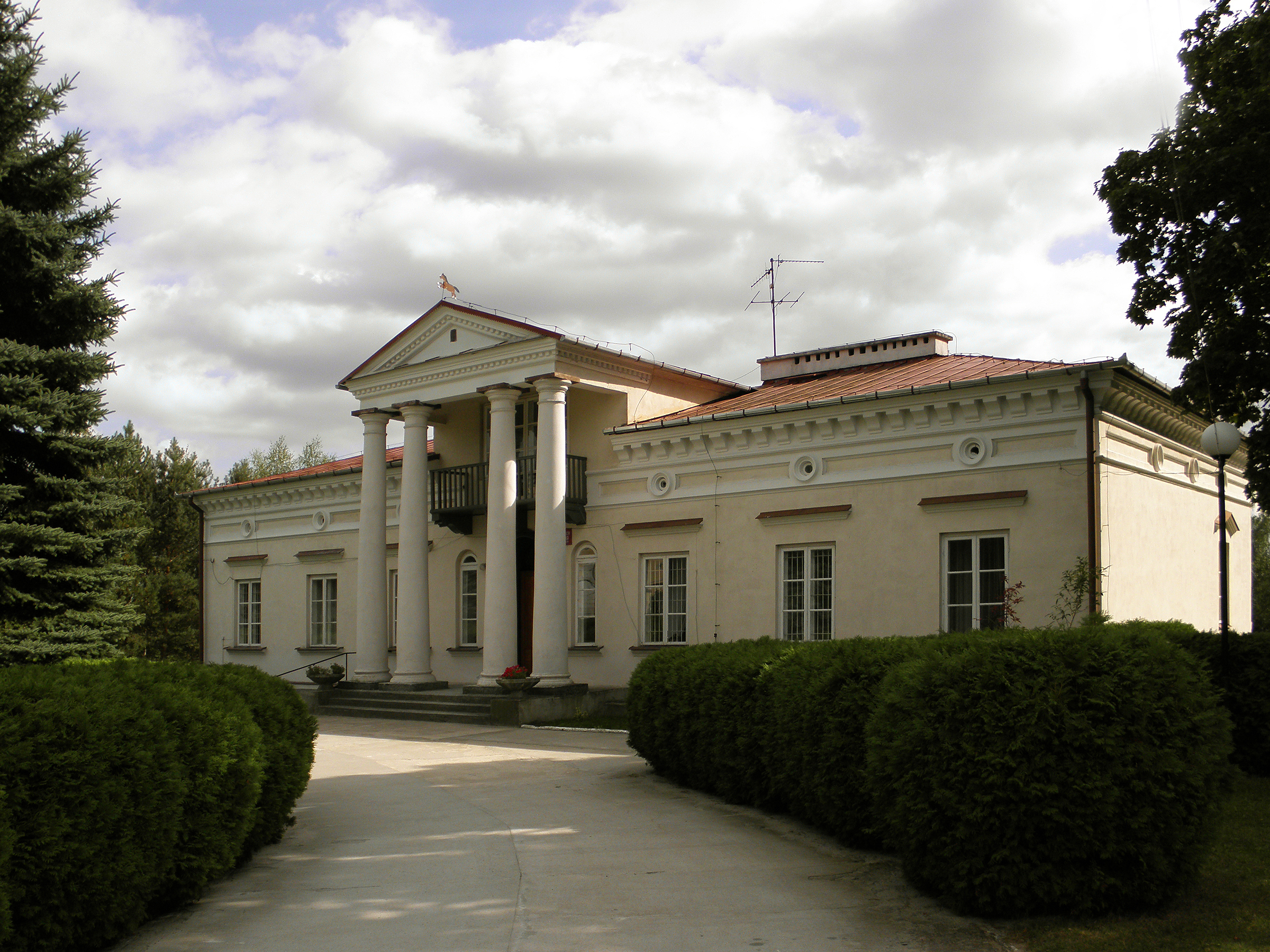

- Location within Poland
- Coordinates: 51°37′53″N 20°41′46″E
- Country: Poland
- Voivodeship: Masovian
- County: Grójec
- Gmina: Mogielnica
- Website: http://www.wikimapia.org/1632102/pl/

Tomczyce [tɔmˈt͡ʂɨt͡sɛ] is a village in the administrative district of Gmina Mogielnica, within Grójec County, Masovian Voivodeship, in east-central Poland.
