= Wężowiec, Masovian Voivodeship =

Wężowiec
- Village
- Location within Poland
- Coordinates: 51°40′50″N 20°39′45″E
- Country: Poland
- Voivodeship: Masovian
- County: Grójec
- Gmina: Mogielnica
- Population: 200

Wężowiec [vɛ̃ˈʐɔvjɛt͡s] is a village in the administrative district of Gmina Mogielnica, within Grójec County, Masovian Voivodeship, in east-central Poland.
