= Jastrzębia, Grójec County =

Jastrzębia
- Village
- Location within Poland
- Coordinates: 51°43′N 20°46′E
- Country: Poland
- Voivodeship: Masovian
- County: Grójec
- Gmina: Mogielnica
- Population: 100

Jastrzębia [jasˈtʂɛmbja] is a village in the administrative district of Gmina Mogielnica, within Grójec County, Masovian Voivodeship, in east-central Poland.
