= Dziunin, Masovian Voivodeship =

Dziunin
- Village
- Location within Poland
- Coordinates: 53°14′N 17°24′E
- Country: Poland
- Voivodeship: Masovian
- County: Grójec
- Gmina: Mogielnica

Dziunin [ˈd͡ʑunin] is a village in the administrative district of Gmina Mogielnica, within Grójec County, Masovian Voivodeship, in east-central Poland.
