= Dobiecin, Gmina Mogielnica =

Dobiecin
- Village
- Location within Poland
- Coordinates: 51°44′01″N 20°39′26″E
- Country: Poland
- Voivodeship: Masovian
- County: Grójec
- Gmina: Mogielnica

Dobiecin [dɔˈbjɛt͡ɕin] is a village in the administrative district of Gmina Mogielnica, within Grójec County, Masovian Voivodeship, in east-central Poland.
