= Górki-Izabelin =

Village in Gmina Mogielnica, Poland

- Village
- Location within Poland
- Coordinates: 51°42′20″N 20°44′15″E
- Country: Poland
- Voivodeship: Masovian
- County: Grójec
- Gmina: Mogielnica

Górki-Izabelin [ˈɡurki izaˈbɛlin] is a village in the administrative district of Gmina Mogielnica, within Grójec County, Masovian Voivodeship, in east-central Poland.
