= Dagobert Frey =

Austrian art historian (1883–1962)

- Born: 23 April 1883; Vienna, Austria
- Died: 13 May 1962 (aged 79); Stuttgart, Germany
- Education: TU Wien
- Occupation: Art historian
- Employer(s): University of Breslau, University of Stuttgart
- Known for: World War II looting of Poland
- Criminal charge: None
- Children: Gerhard Frey (1915–2002)

Dagobert Frey (23 April 1883 in Vienna – 13 May 1962 in Stuttgart) was an Austrian art historian responsible for the theft of the most valuable European and Polish collections from the Warsaw and Kraków museums and national art galleries during the Nazi German occupation of Poland.

As professor in European art history from the Osteuropa-Institut, Frey was wined and dined by Polish art experts numerous times in the late 1930s. He prepared a meticulous list of the most valuable paintings at the National Museum, Warsaw among other locations across Poland. He showed up at the Museum again in October 1939 with the Gestapo, after the capitulation of the Polish capital, and directed the SS-Untersturmführer Theo Daeisel to art pieces that needed to be seized and shipped to Germany first, including the Portrait of a Young Man by Rembrandt from the collections of the Łazienki Palace (Pałac Łazienkowski), and numerous other masterpieces including paintings by Bernardo Bellotto called Canaletto. The items stolen from the National Museum included 99% of all coins, 100% of historic clocks, 80% jewellery, 63% fabrics, 60% furniture, and 70% ancient manuscripts. The Gestapo headquarters in Warsaw presented the Rembrandt as a gift to Hans Frank in occupied Kraków. Frey moved to Kraków the same month, along with his colleague from the SS, dr Joseph Mühlmann. Together, they pinpointed all sorts of treasures at Wawel (architectural detail notwithstanding), directing Frank in a mass looting campaign. On Frey's advice, even the fireplaces were ripped out from the walls.

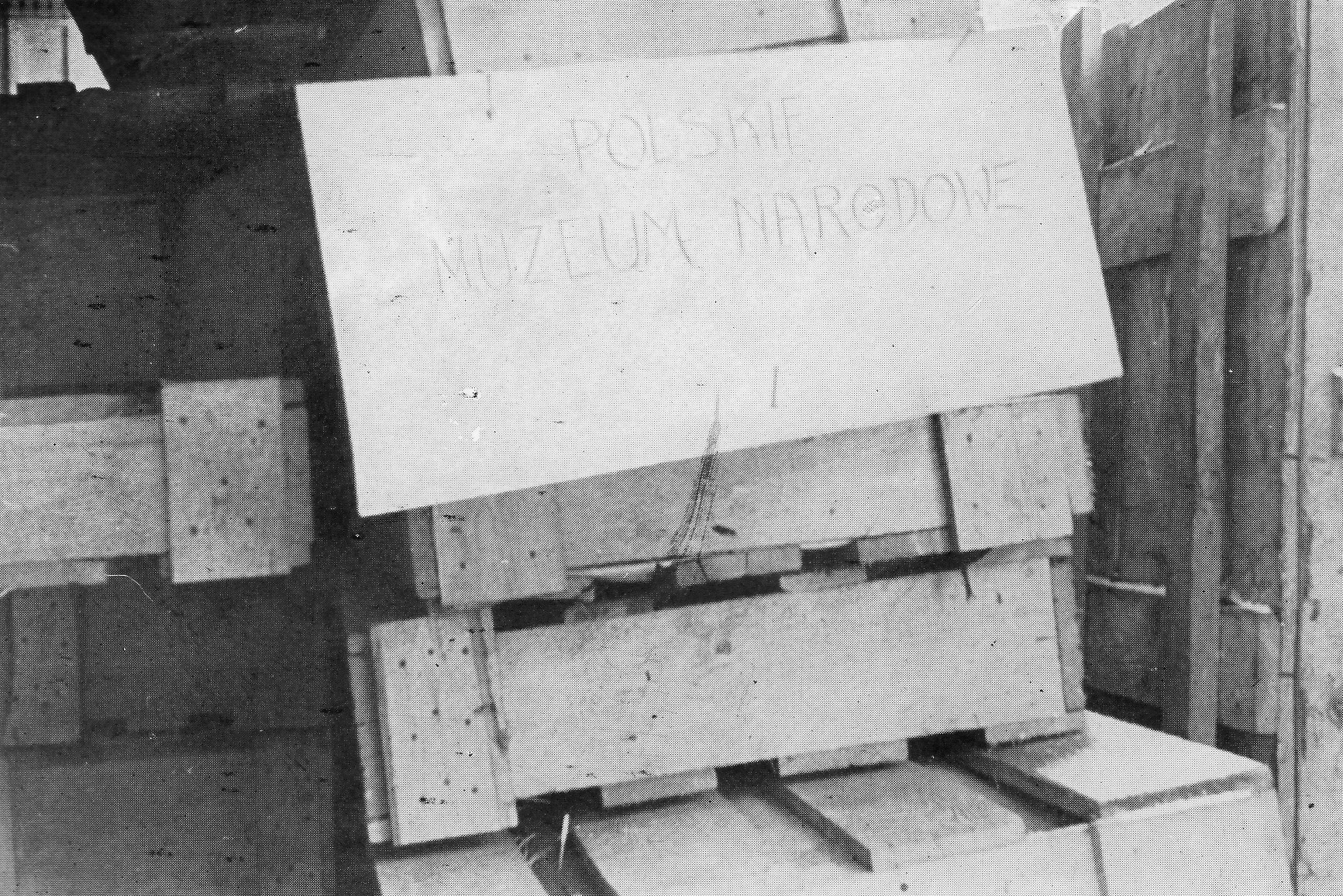
Crates from the National Museum, Kraków packed for shipment to Germany

== Career ==
Frey studied architecture in Vienna at the Technische Hochschule, and in 1911 obtained a job at the Austrian monument conservation bureau. In 1929 he published his controversial book about the Late Middle Ages and in 1931 moved to the Weimar Republic to teach art history in Breslau (Wrocław). After the invasion of Poland, he was selected by Berlin to validate Poland as a "Teutonic land" deliberately with no mention of Jews whatsoever. In 1941 he wrote his infamous book Krakau (German for Kraków) – denying this ancient Polish capital its Slavic origins. In 1942 he wrote a guide to the city of Lublin "without" Jews.

After the war, Frey moved back to Vienna and worked at the municipal office for the restoration of relics. In 1951 he moved to Stuttgart in southern Germany, where he obtained the position of professor at a local polytechnic. Frey never faced justice for his crimes committed in German-occupied Poland.

== See also ==
- Looting of Poland in World War II
- Kajetan Mühlmann
- Nazi plunder – Nazi looting during World War II

== Notes ==
- See: Portrait of a Young Man by Rembrandt offered as gift to Frank in occupied Kraków. Wikimedia Commons.
