= Kozietuły Nowe =

- Village
- Location within Poland
- Coordinates: 51°44′18″N 20°46′18″E
- Country: Poland
- Voivodeship: Masovian
- County: Grójec
- Gmina: Mogielnica

Kozietuły Nowe [kɔʑɛˈtuwɨ ˈnɔvɛ] is a village in the administrative district of Gmina Mogielnica, within Grójec County, Masovian Voivodeship, in east-central Poland.
