= Mogielnica =

Town in Masovian Voivodeship, Poland

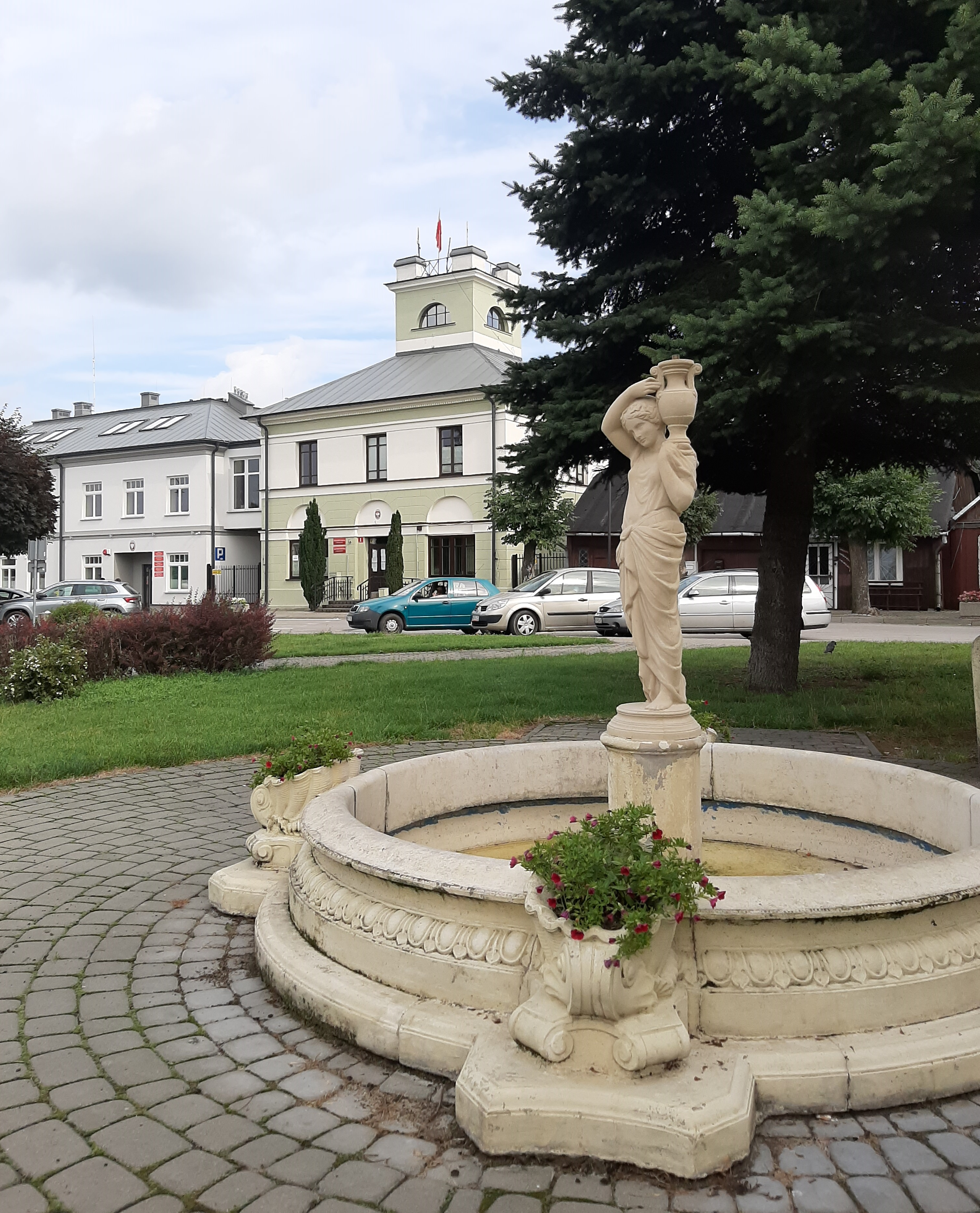
- Market square and town hall

- Coat of arms

- Location within Poland
- Coordinates: 51°41′23″N 20°43′23″E
- Country: Poland
- Voivodeship: Masovian
- County: Grójec
- Gmina: Mogielnica
- Established: 1249
- Town rights: 1317

Government
  - Mayor: Sławomir Chmielewski

Area
  - Total: 12.98 km^{2} (5.01 sq mi)

Population (2006)
  - Total: 2,461
  - Density: 189.6/km^{2} (491.1/sq mi)
- Time zone: UTC+1 (CET)
  - Summer (DST): UTC+2 (CEST)
- Postal code: 05-640
- Area code: +48 48
- Car plates: WGR
- Website: http://www.mogielnica.pl

Mogielnica [mɔɡʲɛlˈɲit͡sa] is a town in Grójec County in Masovian Voivodeship, in central Poland, with 2,475 inhabitants (2004) and an area of 141.56 square kilometres (54.7 sq mi). It is the seat of Gmina Mogielnica (urban-rural gmina administrative unit).

== History ==
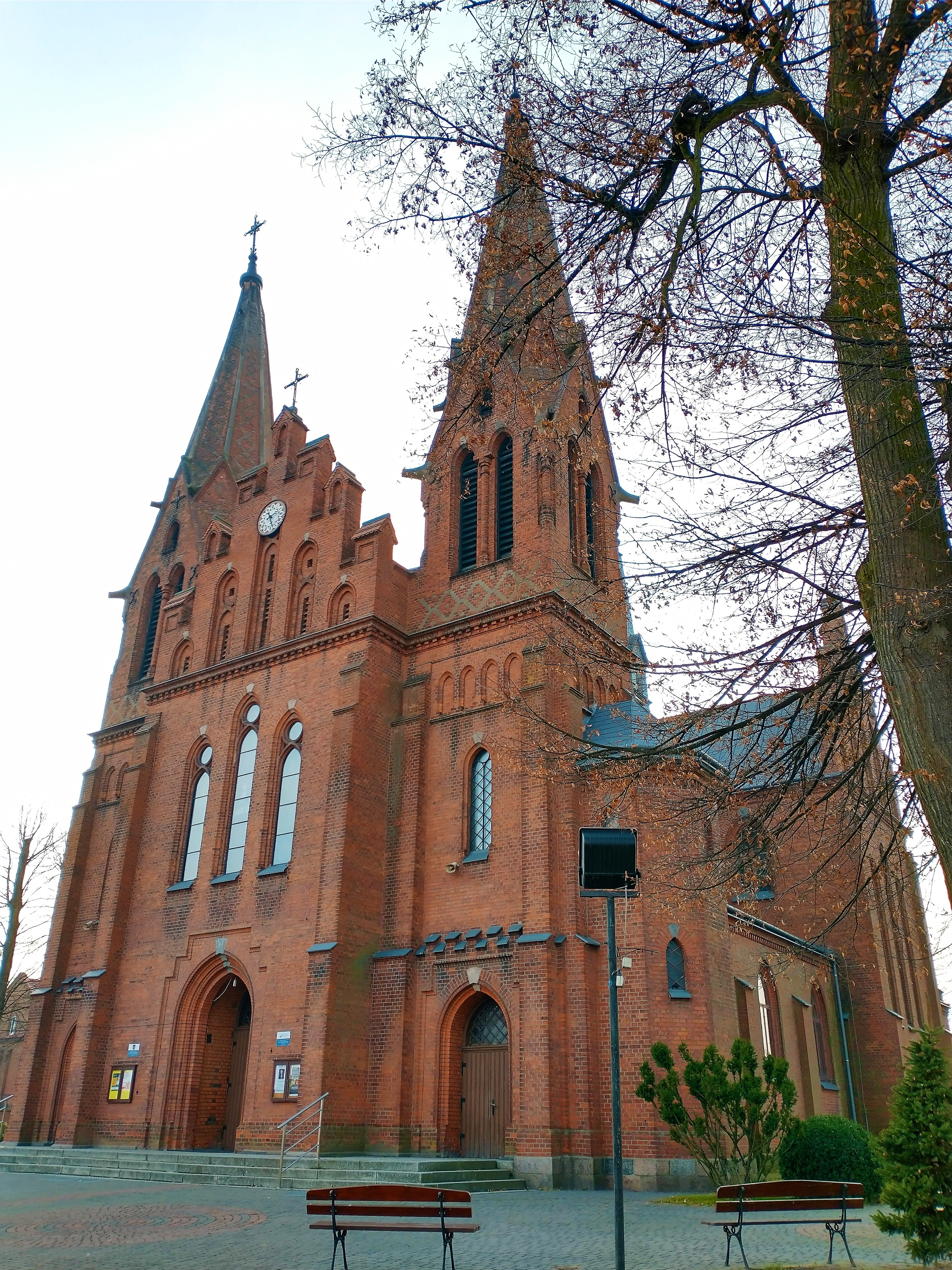
Saint Florian church

Mogielnica was granted town rights modelled after Środa Śląska in 1317 by Duke Siemowit II of Masovia. It was administratively located in the Biała County in the Rawa Voivodeship in the Greater Poland Province of the Kingdom of Poland. In the early modern period, a trade route connecting Warsaw and Kraków ran through the town. It was one of the busiest routes in Poland.

In 1815, the town fell to the Russian Partition of Poland. On January 23, 1863, the second day of the January Uprising, the local populace pushed Russian troops out of the town, who however soon recaptured it. On February 20, 1864, a clash between Polish insurgents and Russian troops took place near the town.

In World War I, the Tsarist regime, in reprisal for its own catastrophic failures in battle with Germany, expelled the Jews of Mogielnica. The Jewish paper, Haynt, published in Congress Poland, stated in its May 23, 1915 issue (under Russian military censorship): "The entire Jewish population was deported from Mogielnica, roughly 5,000 people. They were given a short period of time in which to liquidate their businesses." Some of the Jews returned to Mogielnica once Poland re-emerged as a sovereign state in 1918. In the interwar period, Mogielnica was administratively located in the Grójec County in the Warsaw Voivodeship.

=== World War II ===
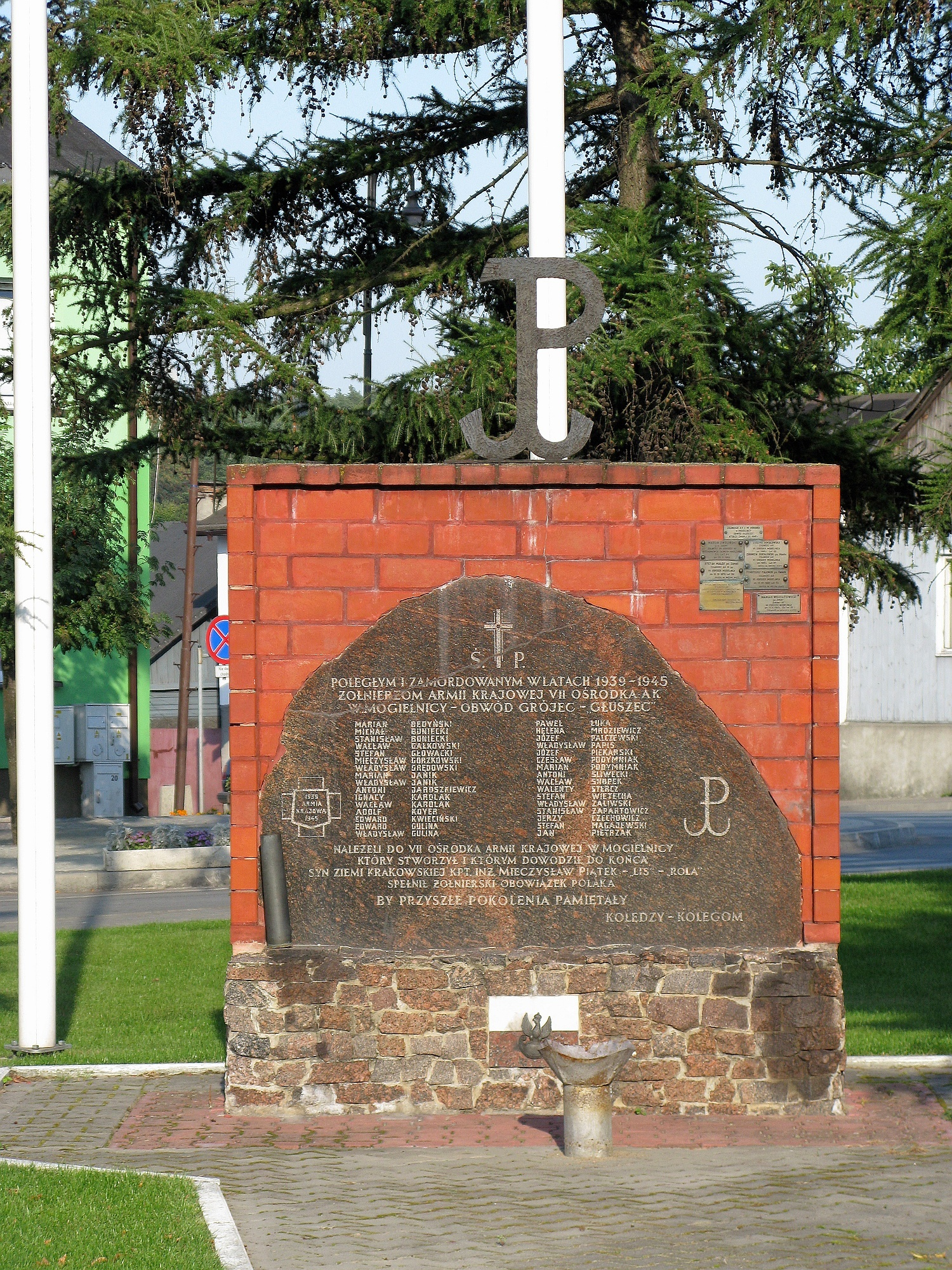
Monument to local fallen Home Army partisans

Following the German-Soviet invasion of Poland, which started World War II in 1939, the town was occupied by Germany. Several Poles who were either born or lived and worked in Mogielnica were murdered by the Russians in the Katyn massacre in 1940. In 1940, German authorities established a ghetto in Mogielnica to confine, persecute and exploit its Jewish population. The ghetto was demolished on February 28, 1942, when its 1,500 inhabitants were transported in cattle trucks to the Warsaw Ghetto, the largest in all of German-occupied Europe, with over 400,000 Jews crowded into an area of 1.3 square miles (3.4 km^{2}). From there, most victims were sent to the Treblinka extermination camp. The Nazis demolished the 18th-century Jewish cemetery located on the left side of the road to Grójec, near Przylesie Street, and used its headstones for pavement. A monument now stands in its place.

== Transport ==
Mogielnica lies on voivodeship road 738 which connects it to Grójec and to Nowe Miasto nad Pilicą.

The nearest railway station is in Warka.
