= Landscape painting =

Depiction of landscapes in art

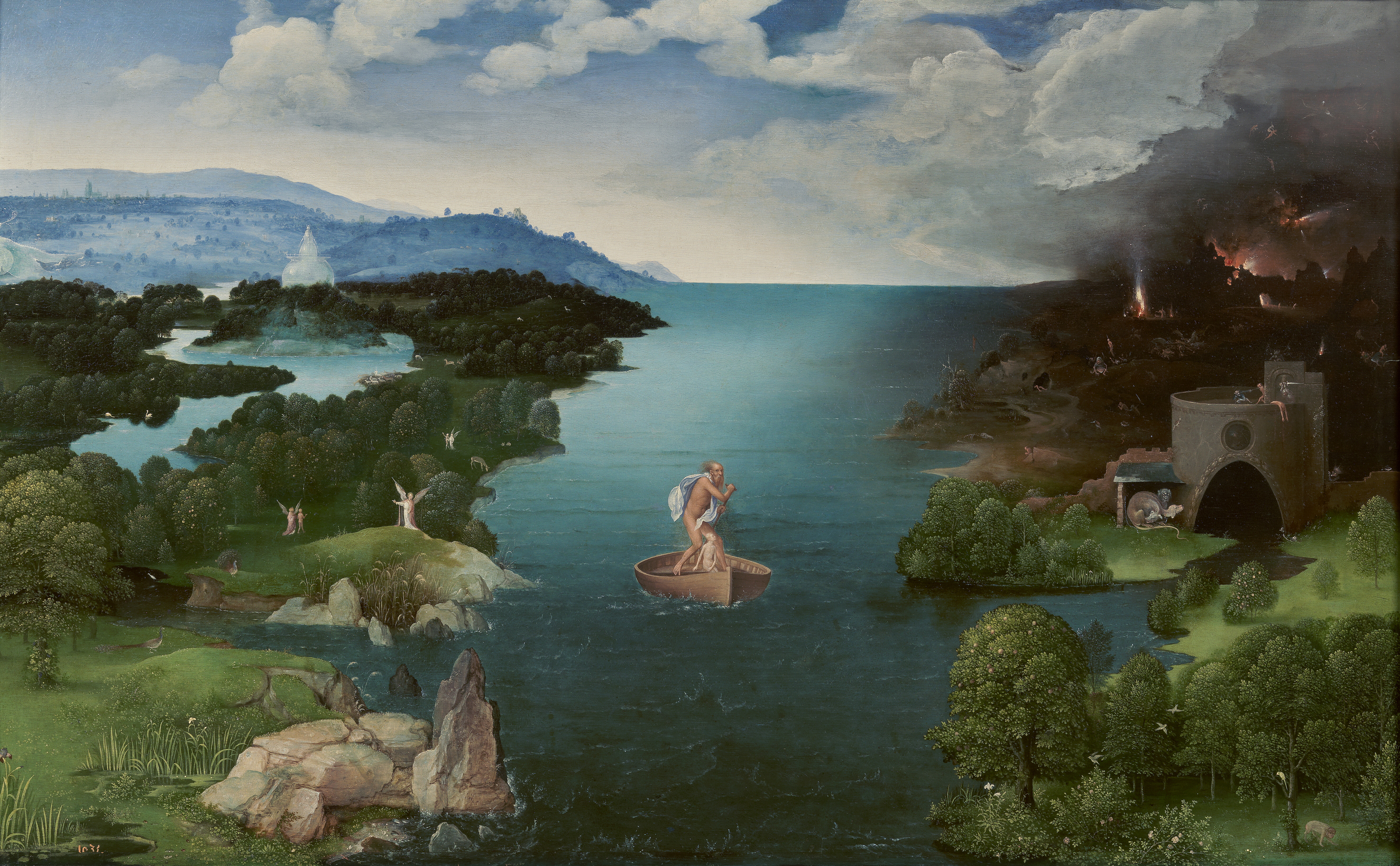
Joachim Patinir (1480–1524), Landscape with Charon Crossing the Styx, 1515–1524. Patinir pioneered the "world landscape" style.

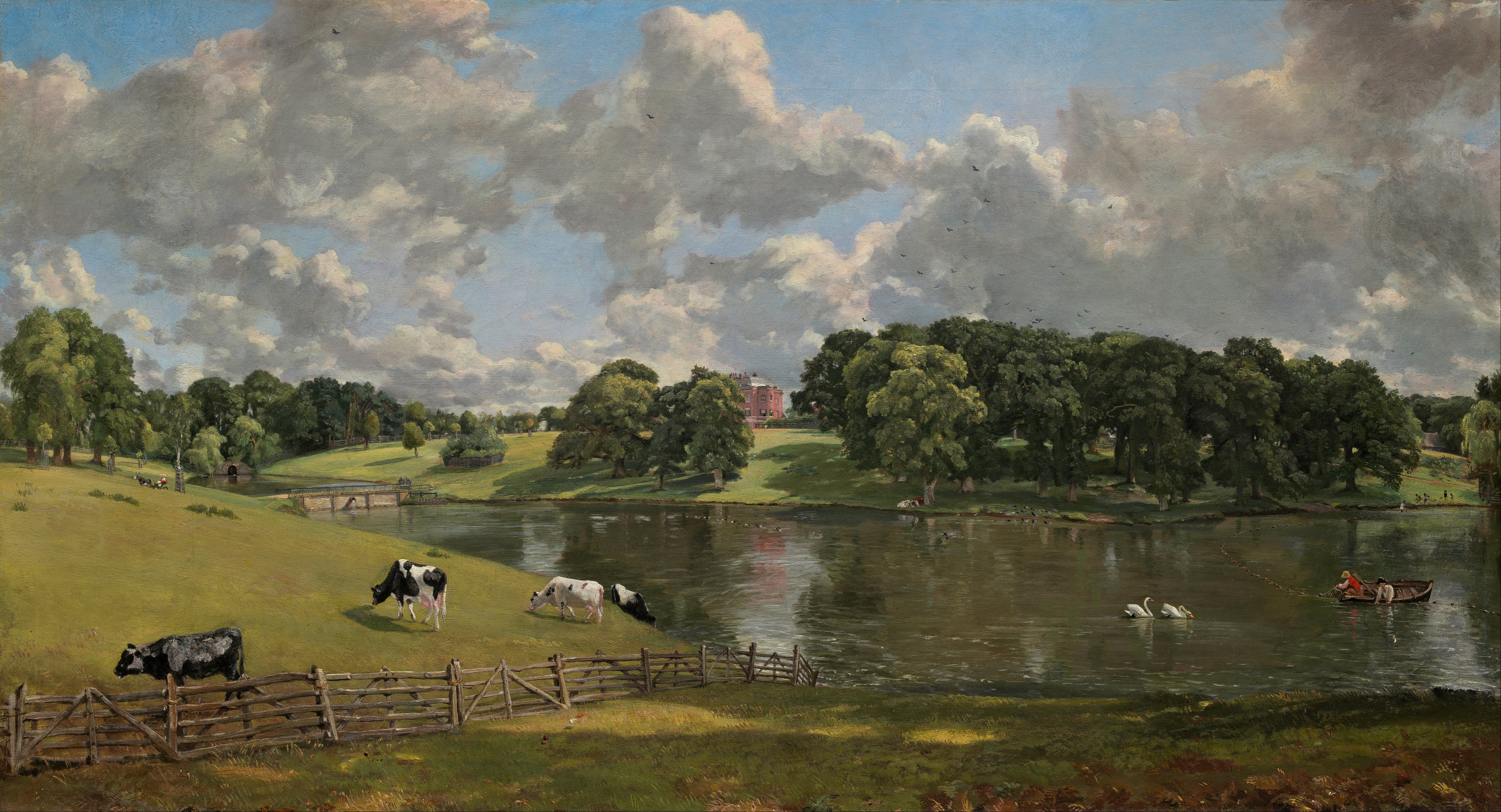
Wivenhoe Park (John Constable, 1816)

Dong Yuan (934–962) Dongtian Mountain Hall (Chinese: 洞天山堂圖). 10th century, the Five Dynasties (Chinese). National Palace Museum, Taipei.

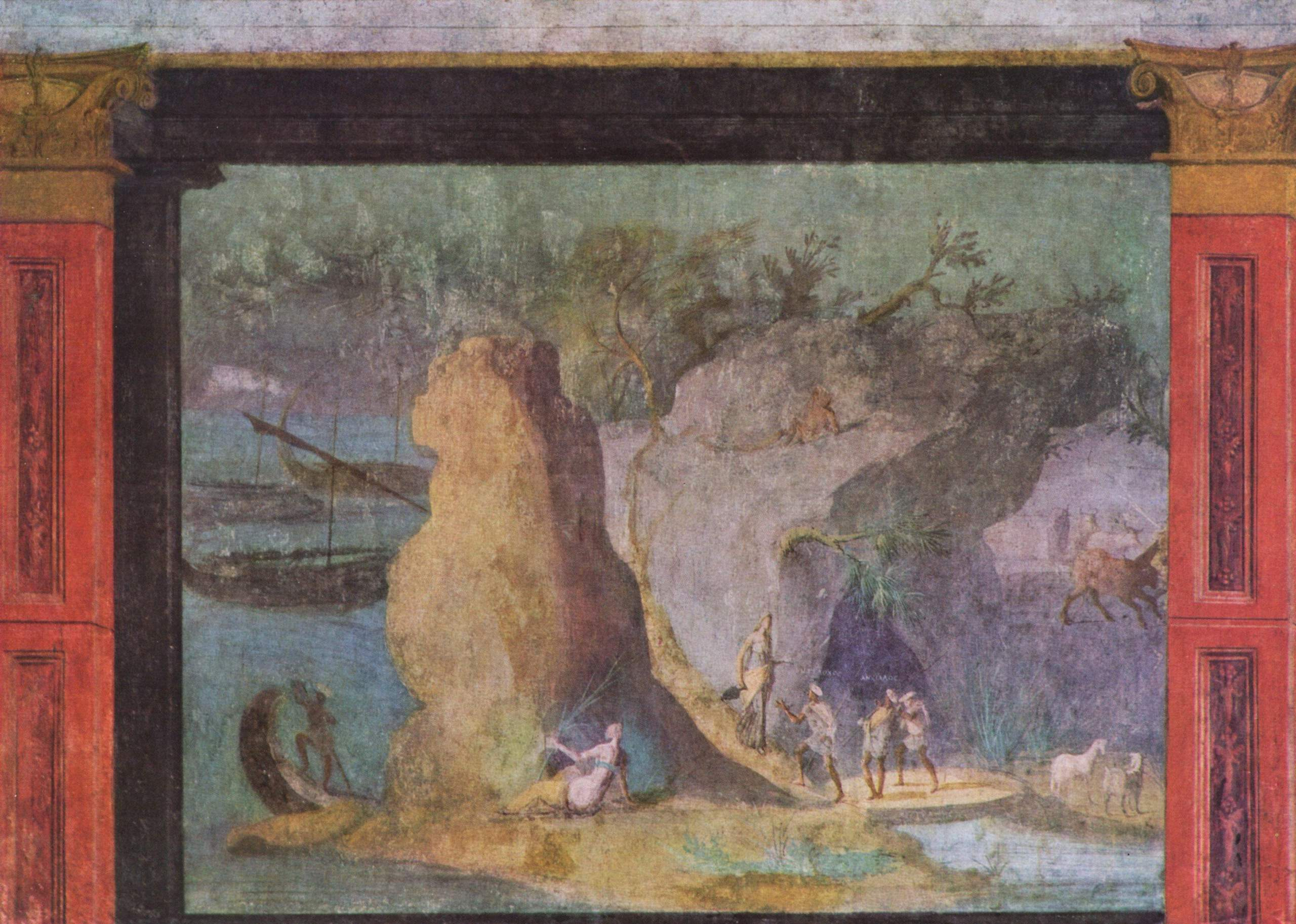
Landscape with scene from the Odyssey, Rome, c. 60–40 BCE

Landscape painting, also known as landscape art, is the depiction in painting of natural scenery such as mountains, valleys, rivers, trees, and forests, especially where the main subject is a wide view—with its elements arranged into a coherent composition. In other works, landscape backgrounds for figures can still form an important part of the work. Sky is almost always included in the view, and weather is often an element of the composition. Detailed landscapes as a distinct subject are not found in all artistic traditions, and develop when there is already a sophisticated tradition of representing other subjects.

Two main traditions spring from Western painting and Chinese art, going back well over a thousand years in both cases. The recognition of a spiritual element in landscape art is present from its beginnings in East Asian art, drawing on Daoism and other philosophical traditions, but in the West only becomes explicit with Romanticism.

Landscape views in art may be entirely imaginary, or copied from reality with varying degrees of accuracy. If the primary purpose of a picture is to depict an actual, specific place, especially including buildings prominently, it is called a topographical view. Such views, extremely common as prints in the West, are often seen as inferior to fine art landscapes, although the distinction is not always meaningful; similar prejudices existed in Chinese art, where literati painting usually depicted imaginary views, while professional artists painted real views.

The word "landscape" entered the modern English language as landskip (variously spelt), an anglicization of the Dutch landschap, around the start of the 17th century, purely as a term for works of art, with its first use as a word for a painting in 1598. Within a few decades it was used to describe vistas in poetry, and eventually as a term for real views. However, the cognate term landscaef or landskipe for a cleared patch of land had existed in Old English, though it is not recorded from Middle English.

== History ==
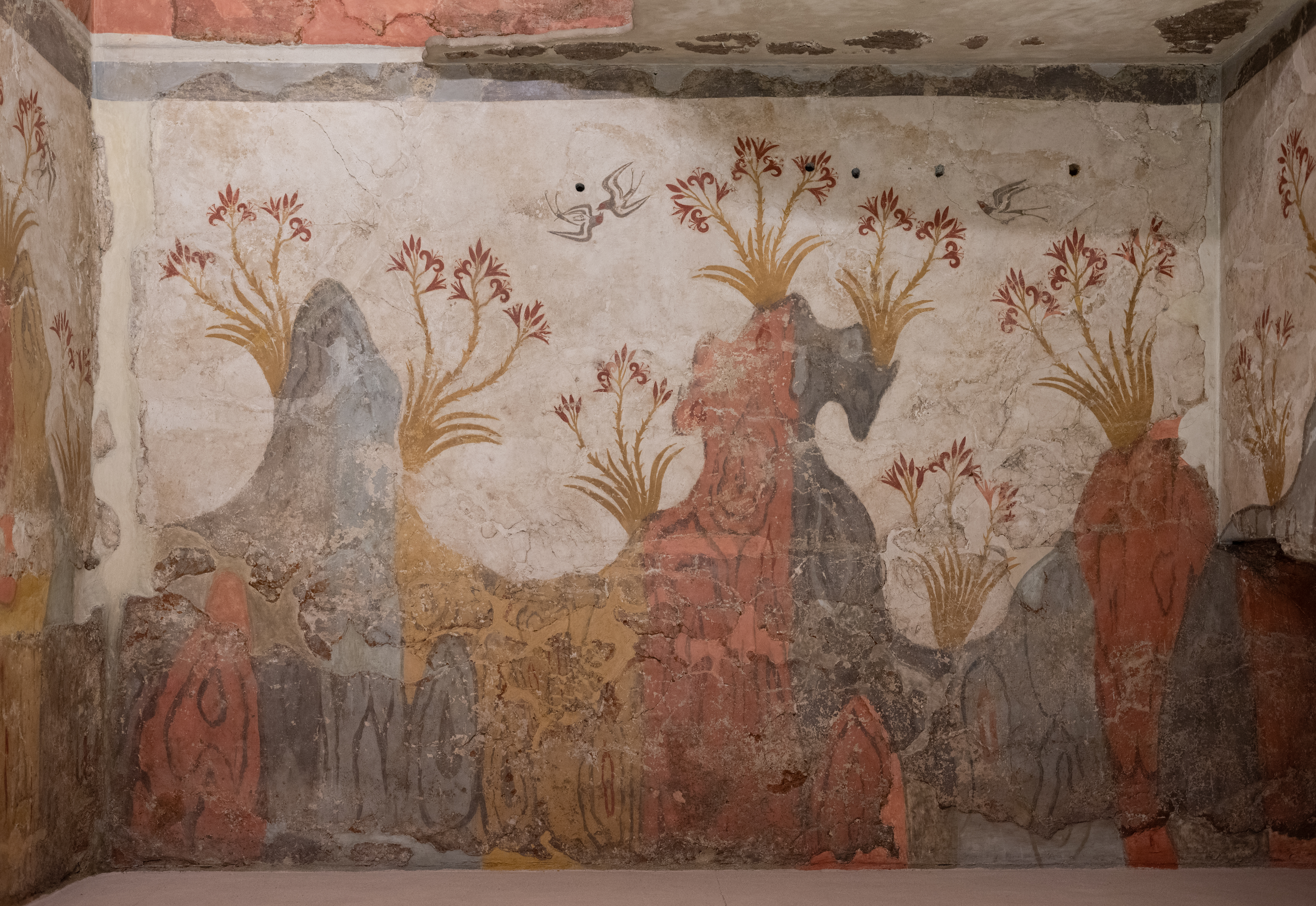
Spring Fresco, Minoan painting from Akrotiri, 1600–1500 BCE

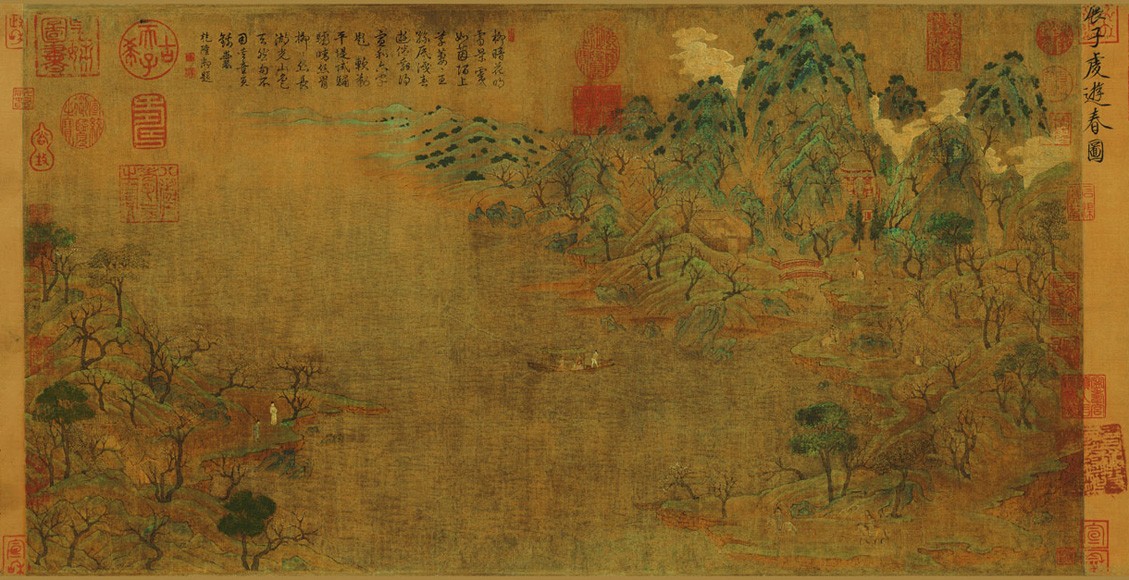
Zhan Ziqian, Strolling About in Spring, a very early Chinese landscape, c. 600

The earliest forms of art around the world depict little that could really be called landscape, although ground-lines and sometimes indications of mountains, trees, or other natural features are included. The earliest "pure landscapes" with no human figures are frescos from Minoan art of around 1500 BCE.

Hunting scenes, especially those set in the enclosed vista of the reed beds of the Nile Delta from Ancient Egypt, can give a strong sense of place, but the emphasis is on individual plant forms and human and animal figures rather than the overall landscape setting. The frescos from the Tomb of Nebamun, now in the British Museum (c. 1350 BC), are a famous example.

For a coherent depiction of a whole landscape, some rough system of perspective, or scaling for distance, is needed, and this seems from literary evidence to have first been developed in Ancient Greece in the Hellenistic period, although no large-scale examples survive. More ancient Roman landscapes survive, from the 1st century BCE onwards, especially frescos of landscapes decorating rooms that have been preserved at archaeological sites of Pompeii, Herculaneum, and elsewhere, and mosaics.

Li Cheng (Chinese: 李成; pinyin: Lǐ Chéng; Wade–Giles: Li Ch'eng; 919–967),Luxuriant Forest among Distant Peaks, detail, 10th century China, Liaoning Provincial Museum.

Hasegawa Tōhaku, Pine Trees screen (松林図 屏風, Shōrin-zu byōbu), one of a pair of folding screens, Japan, 1593. 156.8 cm × 356 cm (61.7 in × 140.2 in)

The Chinese ink painting tradition of shan shui ("mountain-water"), or "pure" landscape, in which the only sign of human life is usually a sage, or a glimpse of his hut, uses sophisticated landscape backgrounds to figure subjects, and landscape art of this period retains a classic and much-imitated status within the Chinese tradition.

Both the Roman and Chinese traditions typically show grand panoramas of imaginary landscapes, generally backed with a range of spectacular mountains – in China often with waterfalls and in Rome often including sea, lakes, or rivers. These were frequently used, as in the example illustrated, to bridge the gap between a foreground scene with figures and a distant panoramic vista, a persistent problem for landscape artists. The Chinese style generally showed only a distant view, or used dead ground or mist to avoid that difficulty.

A major contrast between landscape painting in the West and East Asia has been that while in the West until the 19th century it occupied a low position in the accepted hierarchy of genres, in East Asia the classic Chinese mountain-water ink painting was traditionally the most prestigious form of visual art. Aesthetic theories in both regions gave the highest status to the works seen to require the most imagination from the artist. In the West this was history painting, but in East Asia it was the imaginary landscape, where famous practitioners were, at least in theory, amateur literati, including several emperors of both China and Japan. They were often also poets whose lines and images illustrated each other.

However, in the West, history painting came to require an extensive landscape background where appropriate, so the theory did not entirely work against the development of landscape painting – for several centuries landscapes were regularly promoted to the status of history painting by the addition of small figures to make a narrative scene, typically religious or mythological.

=== Western tradition ===
==== Medieval ====
In early Western medieval art interest in landscape disappears almost entirely, kept alive only in copies of Late Antique works such as the Utrecht Psalter; the last reworking of this source, in an early Gothic version, reduces the previously extensive landscapes to a few trees filling gaps in the composition, with no sense of overall space. A revival in interest in nature initially mainly manifested itself in depictions of small gardens such as the Hortus Conclusus or those in millefleur tapestries. The frescos of figures at work or play in front of a background of dense trees in the Palace of the Popes, Avignon are probably a unique survival of what was a common subject. Several frescos of gardens have survived from Roman houses like the Villa of Livia.

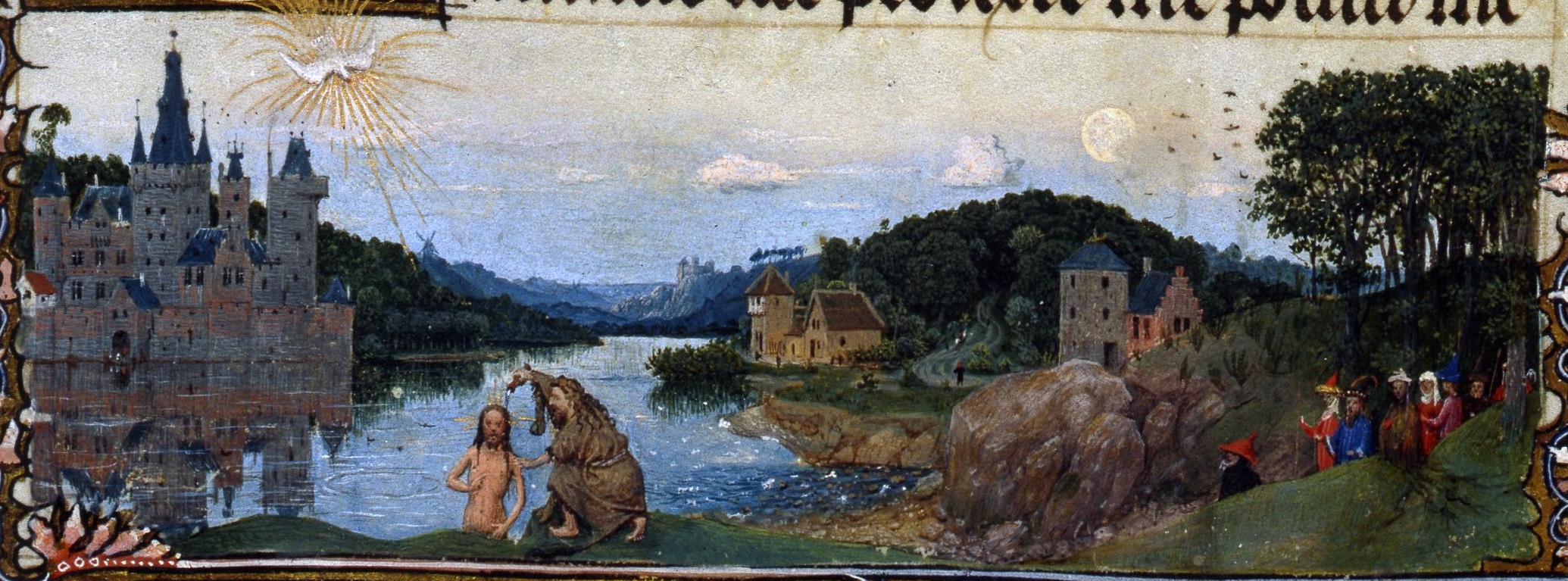
Hand G, Bas-de-page of the Baptism of Christ, Turin-Milan Hours, Flanders c. 1425

During the 14th century Giotto di Bondone and his followers began to acknowledge nature in their work, increasingly introducing elements of the landscape as the background setting for the action of the figures in their paintings. Early in the 15th century, landscape painting was established as a genre in Europe, as a setting for human activity, often expressed in a religious subject, such as the themes of the Rest on the Flight into Egypt, the Journey of the Magi, or Saint Jerome in the Desert. Luxury illuminated manuscripts were very important in the early development of landscape, especially series of the Labours of the Months such as those in the Très Riches Heures du Duc de Berry, which conventionally showed small genre figures in increasingly large landscape settings. A particular advance is shown in the less well-known Turin-Milan Hours, now largely destroyed by fire, whose developments were reflected in Early Netherlandish painting for the rest of the century. The artist known as "Hand G", probably one of the Van Eyck brothers, was especially successful in reproducing effects of light and in a natural-seeming progression from the foreground to the distant view. This was something other artists were to find difficult for a century or more, often solving the problem by showing a landscape background from over the top of a parapet or window-sill, as if from a considerable height.

==== Renaissance ====
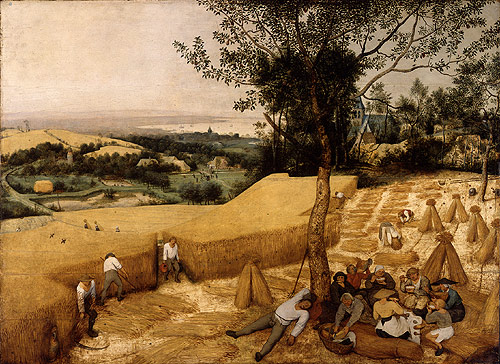
Pieter Brueghel the Elder, The Harvesters, 1565: Peace and agriculture in a pre-Romantic ideal landscape, without sublime terrors

Landscape backgrounds for various types of painting became increasingly prominent and skillful during the 15th century. The period around the end of the 15th century saw pure landscape drawings and watercolours from Leonardo da Vinci, Albrecht Dürer, Fra Bartolomeo, and others, but pure landscape subjects in painting and printmaking, still small, were first produced by Albrecht Altdorfer and others of the German Danube School in the early 16th century. However, the outsides of the wings of a triptych by Gerard David, dated to "about 1510–15", are the earliest from the Low Countries, and possibly in Europe. At the same time Joachim Patinir in the Netherlands developed the "world landscape" a style of panoramic landscape with small figures and using a high aerial viewpoint, that remained influential for a century, being used and perfected by Pieter Brueghel the Elder. The Italian development of a thorough system of graphical perspective was now known all over Europe, which allowed large and complex views to be painted very effectively.

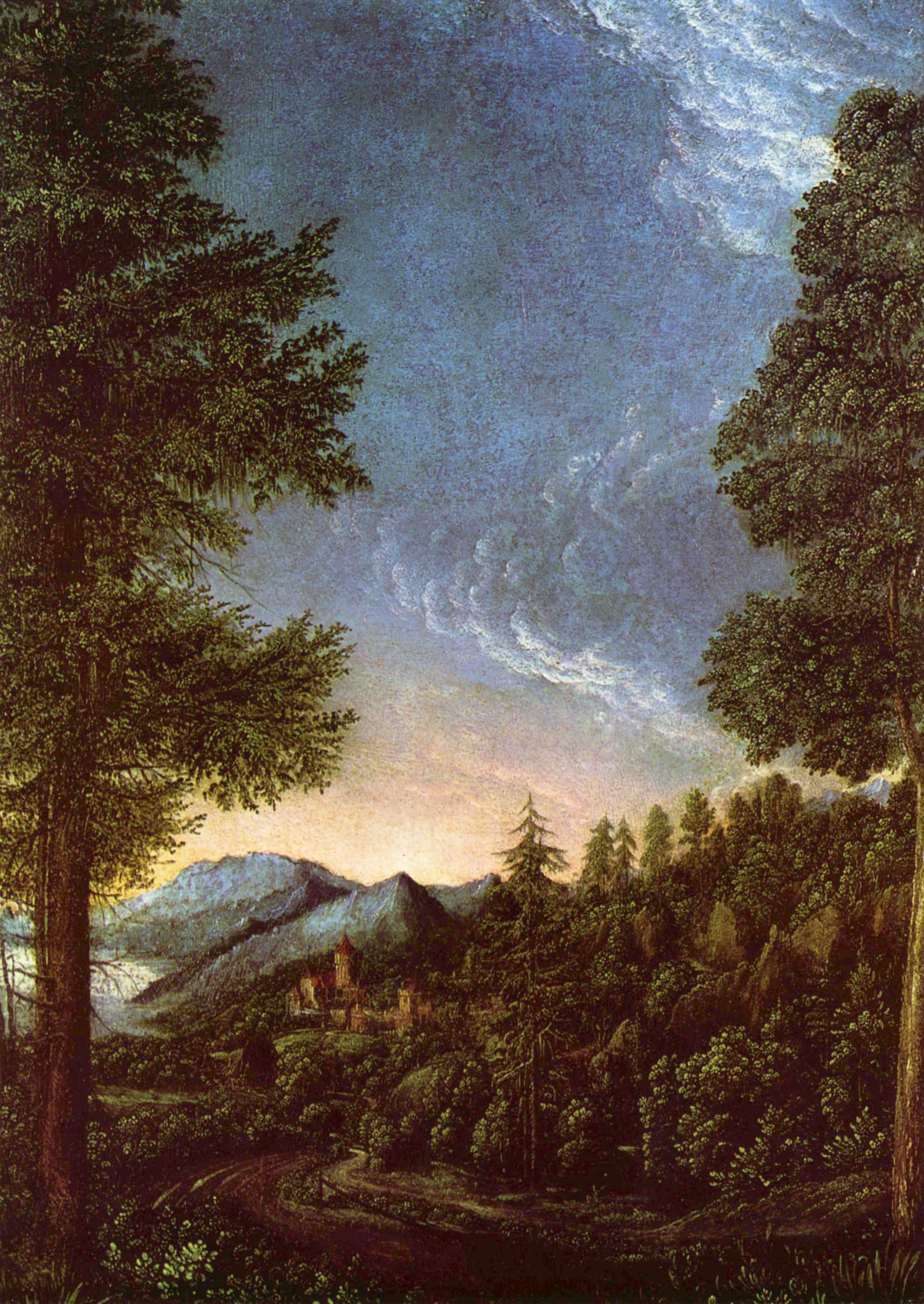
Albrecht Altdorfer (c. 1480–1538), Danube landscape near Regensburg c. 1528, one of the earliest Western pure landscapes, from the Danube School in southern Germany

Landscapes were idealized, mostly reflecting a pastoral ideal drawn from classical poetry which was first fully expressed by Giorgione and the young Titian, and remained associated above all with hilly wooded Italian landscape, which was depicted by artists from Northern Europe who had never visited Italy, just as plain-dwelling literati in China and Japan painted vertiginous mountains. Though often young artists were encouraged to visit Italy to experience Italian light, many Northern European artists could make their living selling Italianate landscapes without ever bothering to make the trip. Indeed, certain styles were so popular that they became formulas that could be copied again and again.

The publication in Antwerp in 1559 and 1561 of two series of a total of 48 prints (the Small Landscapes) after drawings by an anonymous artist referred to as the Master of the Small Landscapes signaled a shift away from the imaginary, distant landscapes with religious content of the world landscape toward close-up renderings at eye-level of identifiable country estates and villages populated with figures engaged in daily activities. By abandoning the panoramic viewpoint of the world landscape and focusing on the humble, rural, and even topographical, the Small Landscapes set the stage for Netherlandish landscape painting in the 17th century. After the publication of the Small Landscapes, landscape artists in the Low Countries either continued with the world landscape or followed the new mode presented by the Small Landscapes.

==== 17th and 18th centuries ====
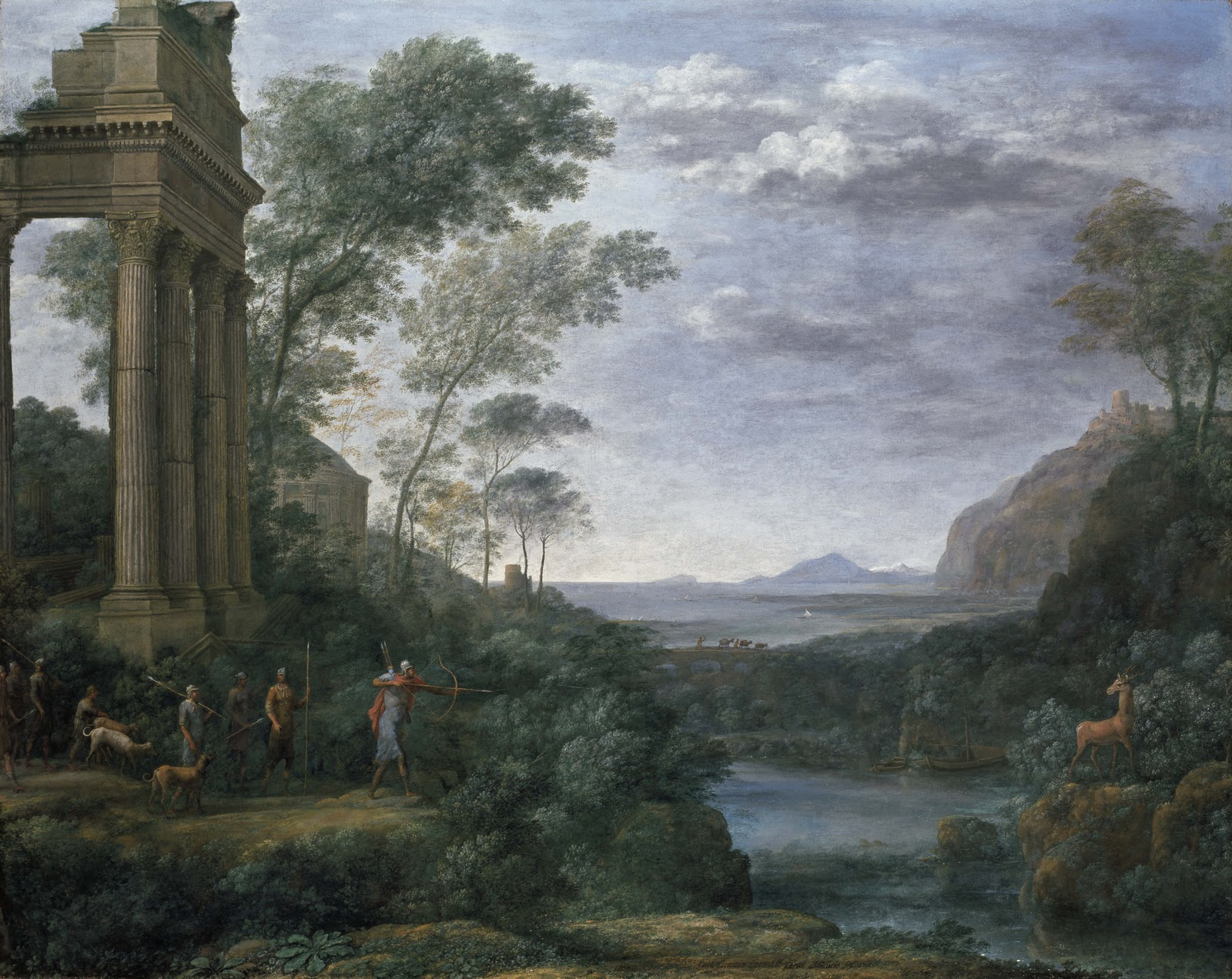
Claude Lorrain, Ascanius Shooting the Stag of Sylvia, 1682. The landscape as history painting.

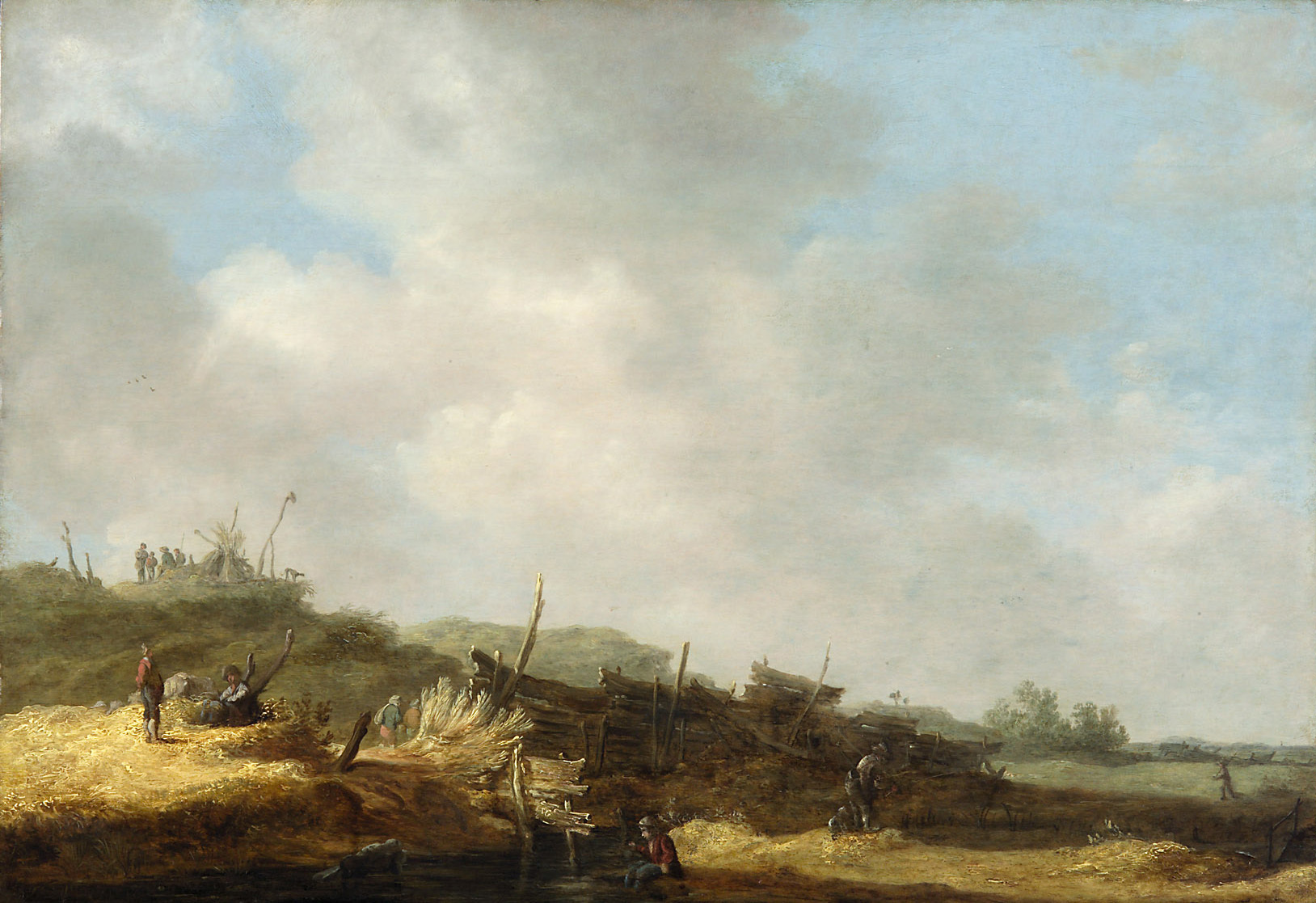
Jan van Goyen, Dune landscape, c. 1630–1635, an example of the "tonal" style in Dutch Golden Age painting

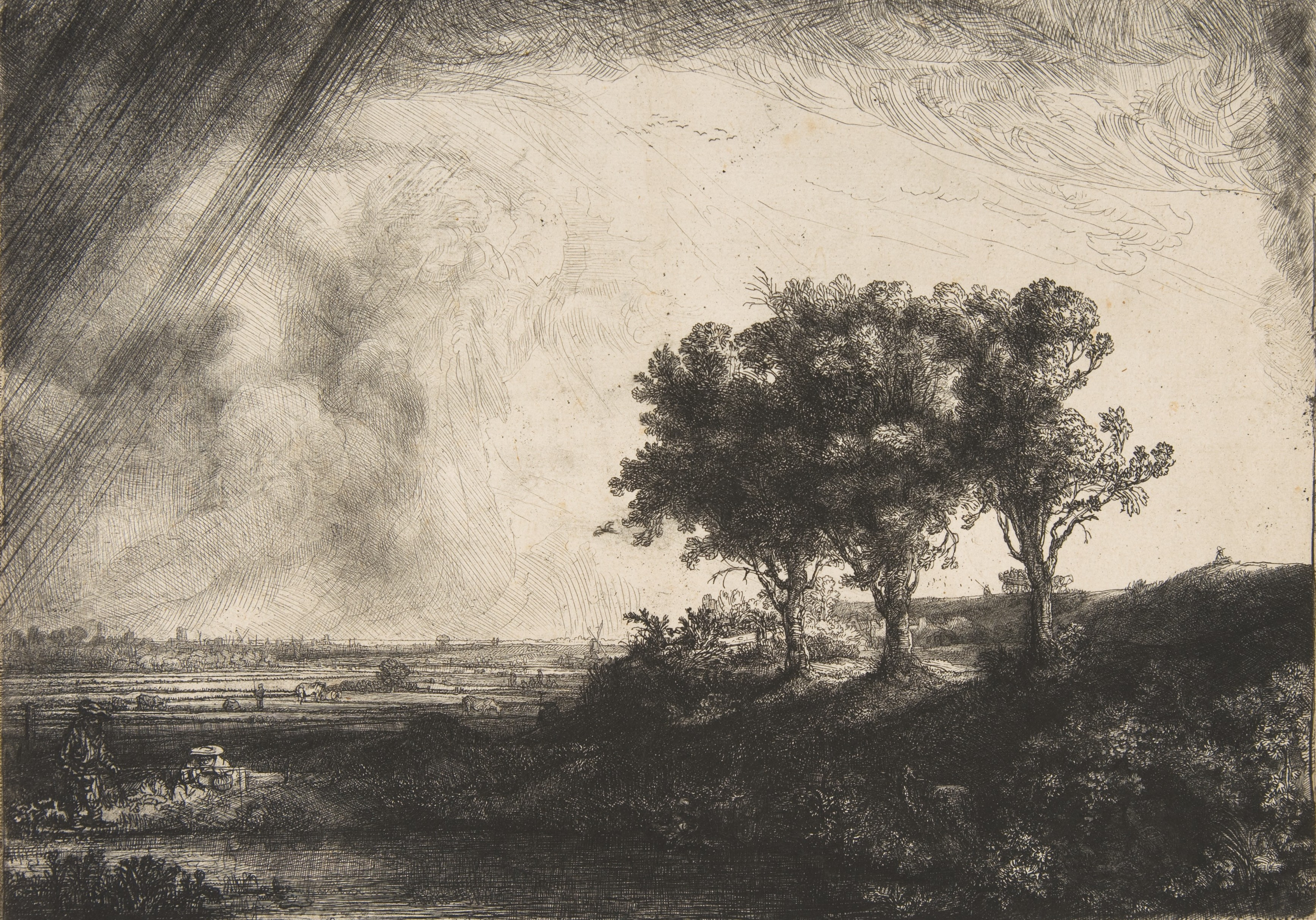
Rembrandt, The Three Trees, 1643, etching

The popularity of exotic landscape scenes can be seen in the success of the painter Frans Post, who spent the rest of his life painting Brazilian landscapes after a trip there in 1636–1644. Other painters who never crossed the Alps could make money selling Rhineland landscapes, and still others for constructing fantasy scenes for a particular commission such as Cornelis de Man's view of Smeerenburg in 1639.

Compositional formulae using elements like the repoussoir were evolved which remain influential in modern photography and painting, notably by Poussin and Claude Lorrain, both French artists living in 17th century Rome and painting largely classical subject-matter, or Biblical scenes set in the same landscapes. Unlike their Dutch contemporaries, Italian and French landscape artists still most often wanted to keep their classification within the hierarchy of genres as history painting by including small figures to represent a scene from classical mythology or the Bible. Salvator Rosa gave picturesque excitement to his landscapes by showing wilder Southern Italian country, often populated by banditi.

Dutch Golden Age painting of the 17th century saw the dramatic growth of landscape painting, in which many artists specialized, and the development of extremely subtle realist techniques for depicting light and weather. There are different styles and periods, and sub-genres of marine and animal painting, as well as a distinct style of Italianate landscape. Most Dutch landscapes were relatively small, but landscapes in Flemish Baroque painting, still usually peopled, were often very large, above all in the series of works that Peter Paul Rubens painted for his own houses. Landscape prints were also popular, with those of Rembrandt and the experimental works of Hercules Seghers usually considered the finest.

The Dutch tended to make smaller paintings for smaller houses. Some Dutch landscape specialties named in period inventories include the Batalje, or battle-scene; the Maneschijntje, or moonlight scene; the Bosjes, or woodland scene; the Boederijtje, or farm scene, and the Dorpje or village scene. Though not named at the time as a specific genre, the popularity of Roman ruins inspired many Dutch landscape painters of the period to paint the ruins of their own region, such as monasteries and churches ruined after the Beeldenstorm.

Jacob van Ruisdael is considered the most versatile of all Dutch Golden Age landscape painters. The popularity of landscapes in the Netherlands was in part a reflection of the virtual disappearance of religious painting in a Calvinist society, and the decline of religious painting in the 18th and 19th centuries all over Europe combined with Romanticism to give landscapes a much greater and more prestigious place in 19th-century art than they had assumed before.

In England, landscapes had initially been mostly backgrounds to portraits, typically suggesting the parks or estates of a landowner, though mostly painted in London by an artist who had never visited his sitter's rolling acres. The English tradition was founded by Anthony van Dyck and other mostly Flemish artists working in England, but in the 18th century the works of Claude Lorrain were keenly collected and influenced not only paintings of landscapes, but the English landscape gardens of Capability Brown and others.

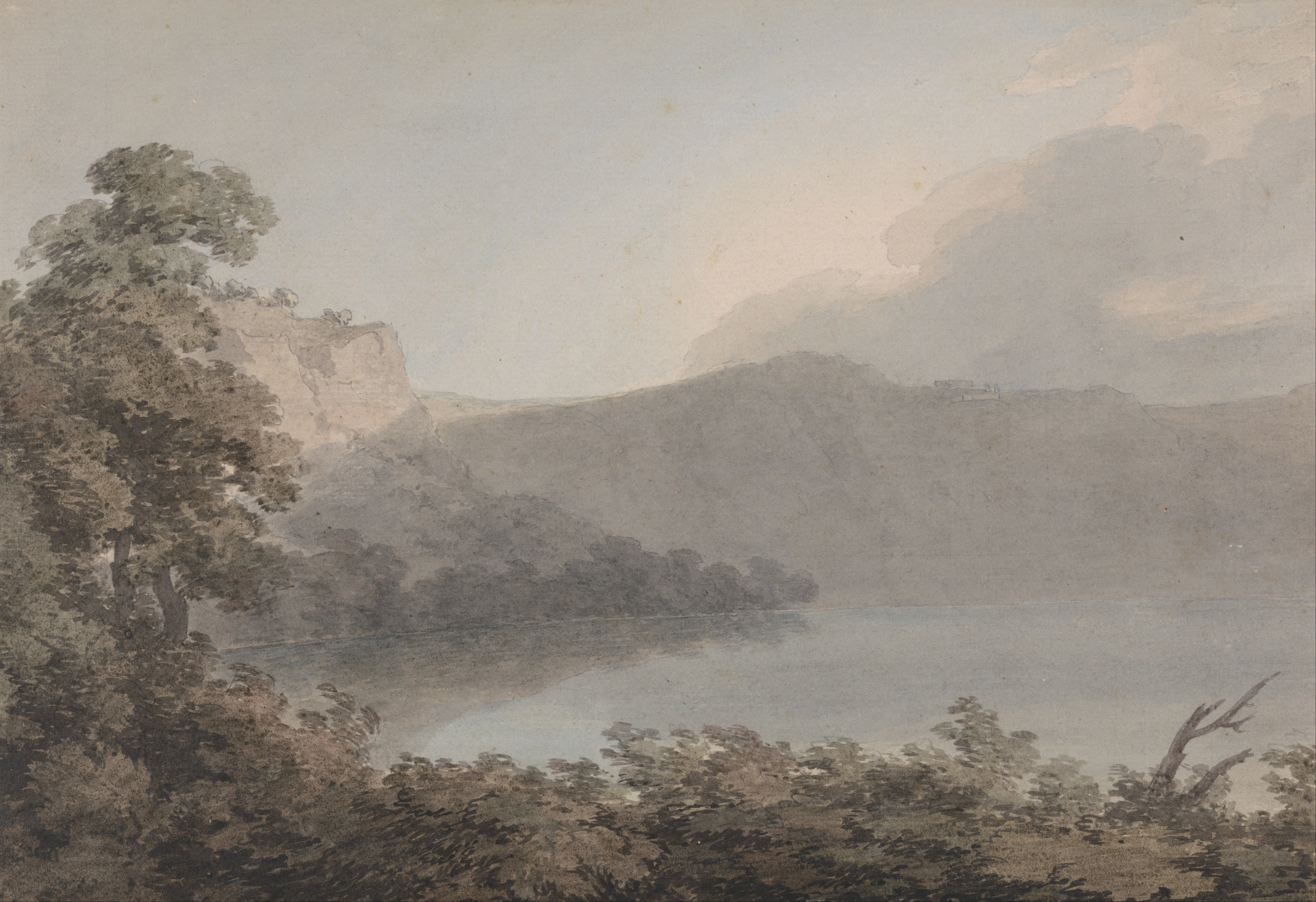
Watercolour in the English tradition, John Robert Cozens, Lake of Vico Between Rome and Florence, c. 1783

In the 18th century, watercolour painting, mostly of landscapes, became an English specialty, with both a buoyant market for professional works, and a large number of amateur painters, many following the popular systems found in the books of Alexander Cozens and others. By the beginning of the 19th century the English artists with the highest modern reputations were mostly dedicated landscape painters, showing the wide range of Romantic interpretations of the English landscape found in the works of John Constable, J. M. W. Turner, and Samuel Palmer. However all these had difficulty establishing themselves in the contemporary art market, which still preferred history paintings and portraits.

In Europe, as John Ruskin said, and Sir Kenneth Clark confirmed, landscape painting was the "chief artistic creation of the nineteenth century", and "the dominant art", with the result that in the following period people were "apt to assume that the appreciation of natural beauty and the painting of landscape is a normal and enduring part of our spiritual activity" In Clark's analysis, underlying European ways to convert the complexity of landscape to an idea were four fundamental approaches: the acceptance of descriptive symbols, a curiosity about the facts of nature, the creation of fantasy to allay deep-rooted fears of nature, and the belief in a Golden Age of harmony and order, which might be retrieved.

The 18th century was also a great age for the topographical print, depicting more or less accurately a real view in a way that landscape painting rarely did. Initially these were mostly centred on a building, but over the course of the century, with the growth of the Romantic movement pure landscapes became more common. The topographical print, often intended to be framed and hung on a wall, remained a very popular medium into the 20th century, but was often classed as a lower form of art than an imagined landscape.

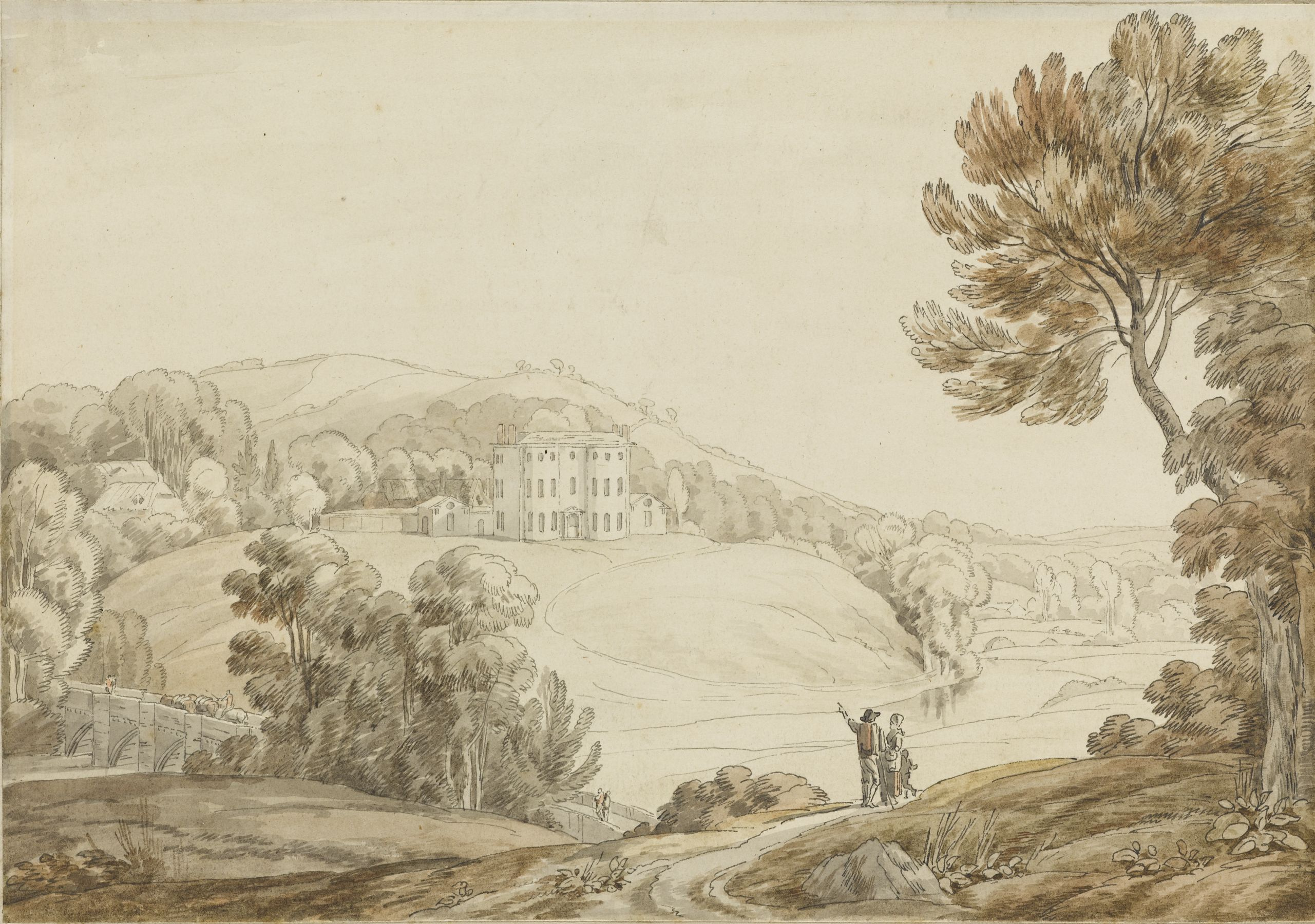
Cowley Place, near Exeter, by Francis Towne, c. 1812

Landscapes in watercolour on paper became a distinct specialism, above all in England, where a particular tradition of talented artists who only, or almost entirely, painted landscape watercolours developed, as it did not in other countries. These were very often real views, though sometimes the compositions were adjusted for artistic effect. The paintings sold relatively cheaply, but were far quicker to produce. These professionals could augment their income by training the "armies of amateurs" who also painted.

Leading artists included John Robert Cozens, Francis Towne, Thomas Girtin, Michael Angelo Rooker, William Pars, Thomas Hearne, and John Warwick Smith, all in the late 18th century, and John Glover, Joseph Mallord William Turner, John Varley, John Sell Cotman, Anthony Copley Fielding, and Samuel Palmer in the early 19th.

==== 19th and 20th centuries ====
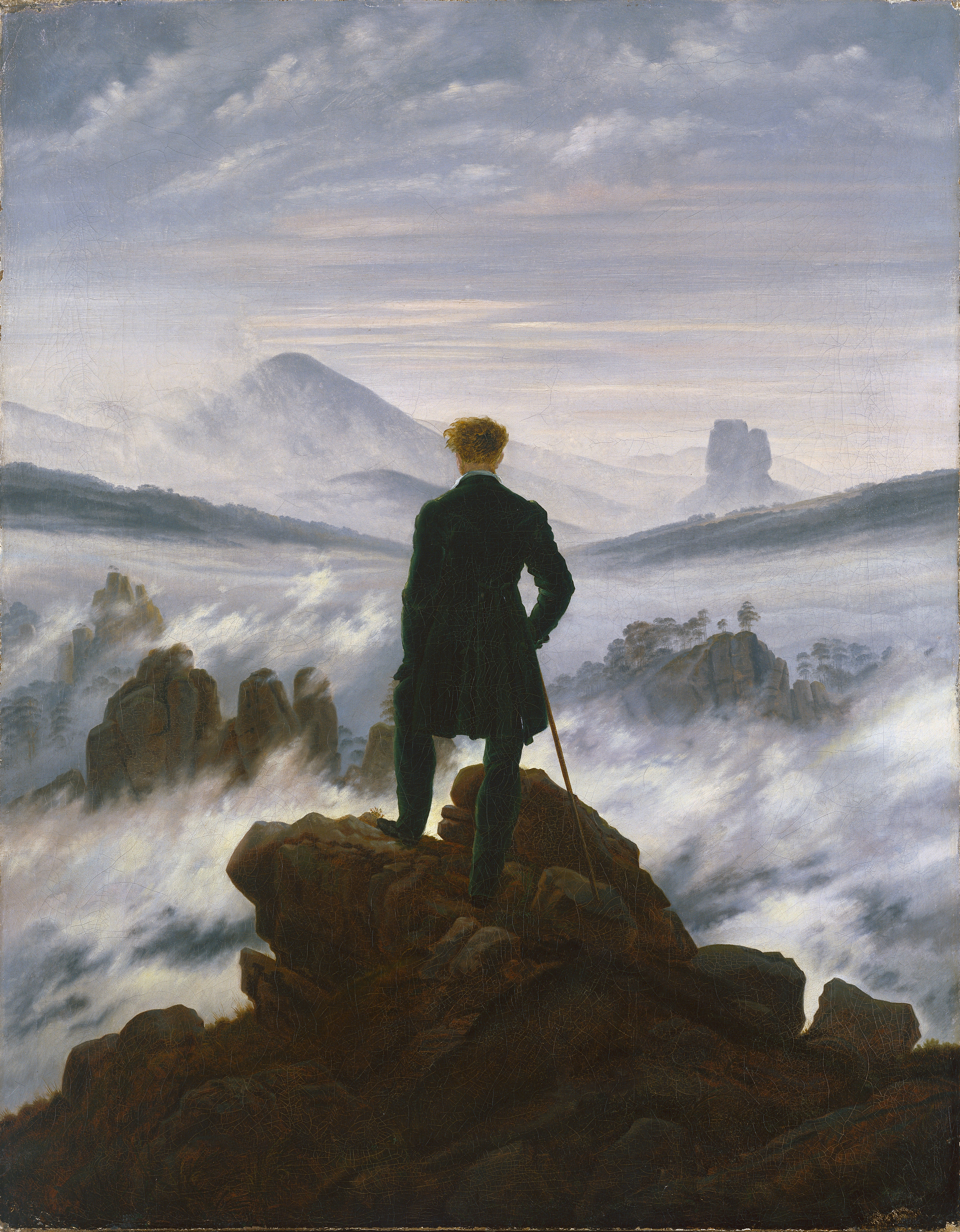
Caspar David Friedrich, Wanderer above the Sea of Fog, 1818. A classic image of German Romanticism.

The Romantic movement intensified the existing interest in landscape art, and remote and wild landscapes, which had been one recurring element in earlier landscape art, now became more prominent. The German Caspar David Friedrich had a distinctive style, influenced by his Danish training, where a distinct national style, drawing on the Dutch 17th-century example, had developed. To this he added a quasi-mystical Romanticism. French painters were slower to develop landscape painting, but from about the 1830s Jean-Baptiste-Camille Corot and other painters in the Barbizon School established a French landscape tradition that would become the most influential in Europe for a century, with the Impressionists and Post-Impressionists for the first time making landscape painting the main source of general stylistic innovation across all types of painting.

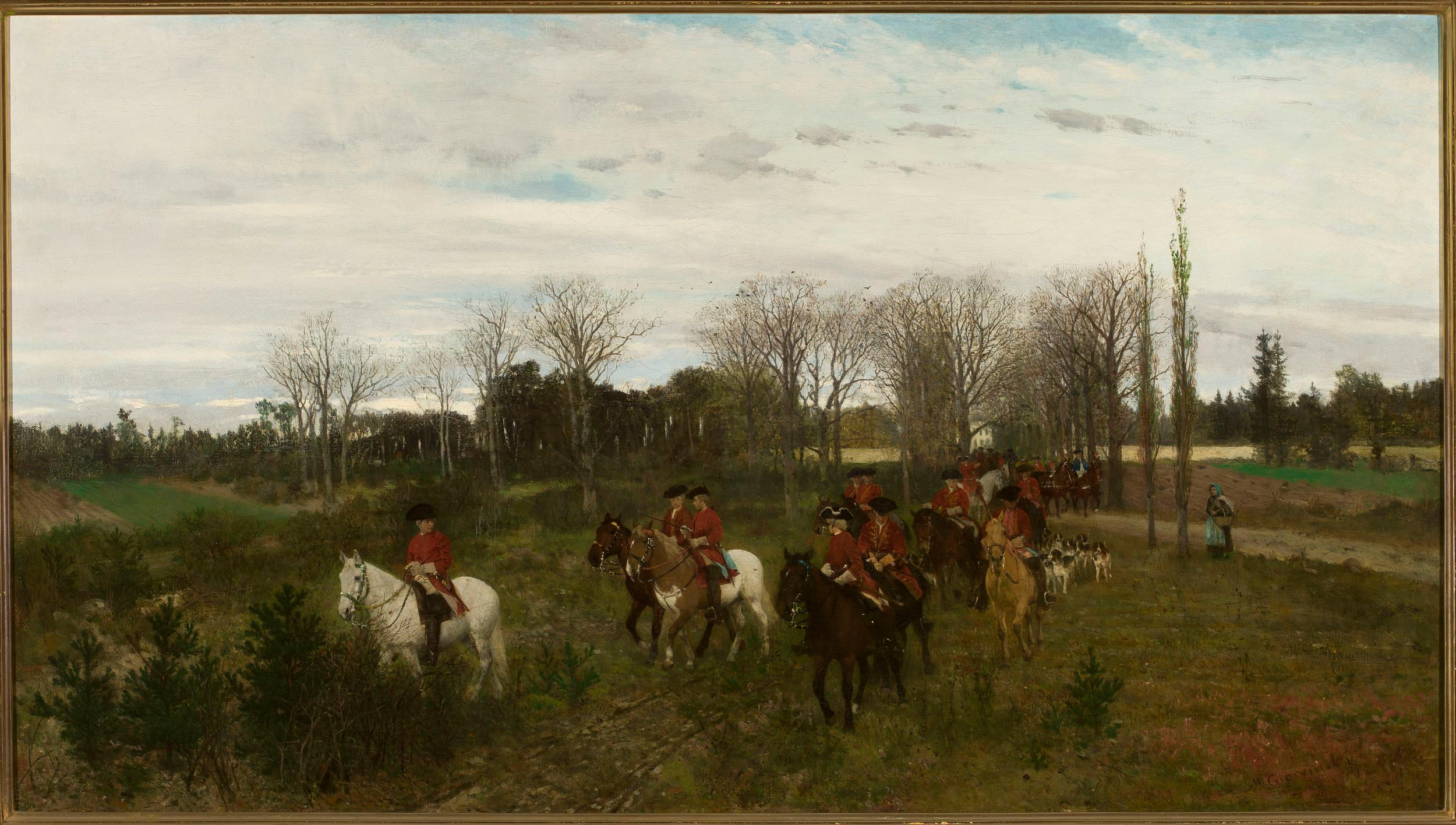
Maksymilian Gierymski, A Hunting Party, Polish 19th century realism, 1871

The nationalism of the new United Provinces had been a factor in the popularity of Dutch 17th-century landscape painting and in the 19th century, as other nations attempted to develop distinctive national schools of painting, the attempt to express the special nature of the landscape of the homeland became a general tendency. In Russia, as in America, the gigantic size of paintings was itself a nationalist statement. In Poland the main representatives of landscape painting, in the second part of the 19th century, were Maksymilian Gierymski, Józef Chełmoński, and Stanisław Masłowski

In Spain, the main promoter of the genre was the Belgium-born painter Carlos de Haes, one of the most active landscape professors at the Academy of Fine Arts of San Fernando in Madrid since 1857. After studying with the great Flemish landscape masters, he developed his technique to paint outdoors. Back in Spain, Haes took his students with him to paint in the countryside; under his teaching the "painters proliferated and took advantage of the new railway system to explore the furthest corners of the nation's topography."

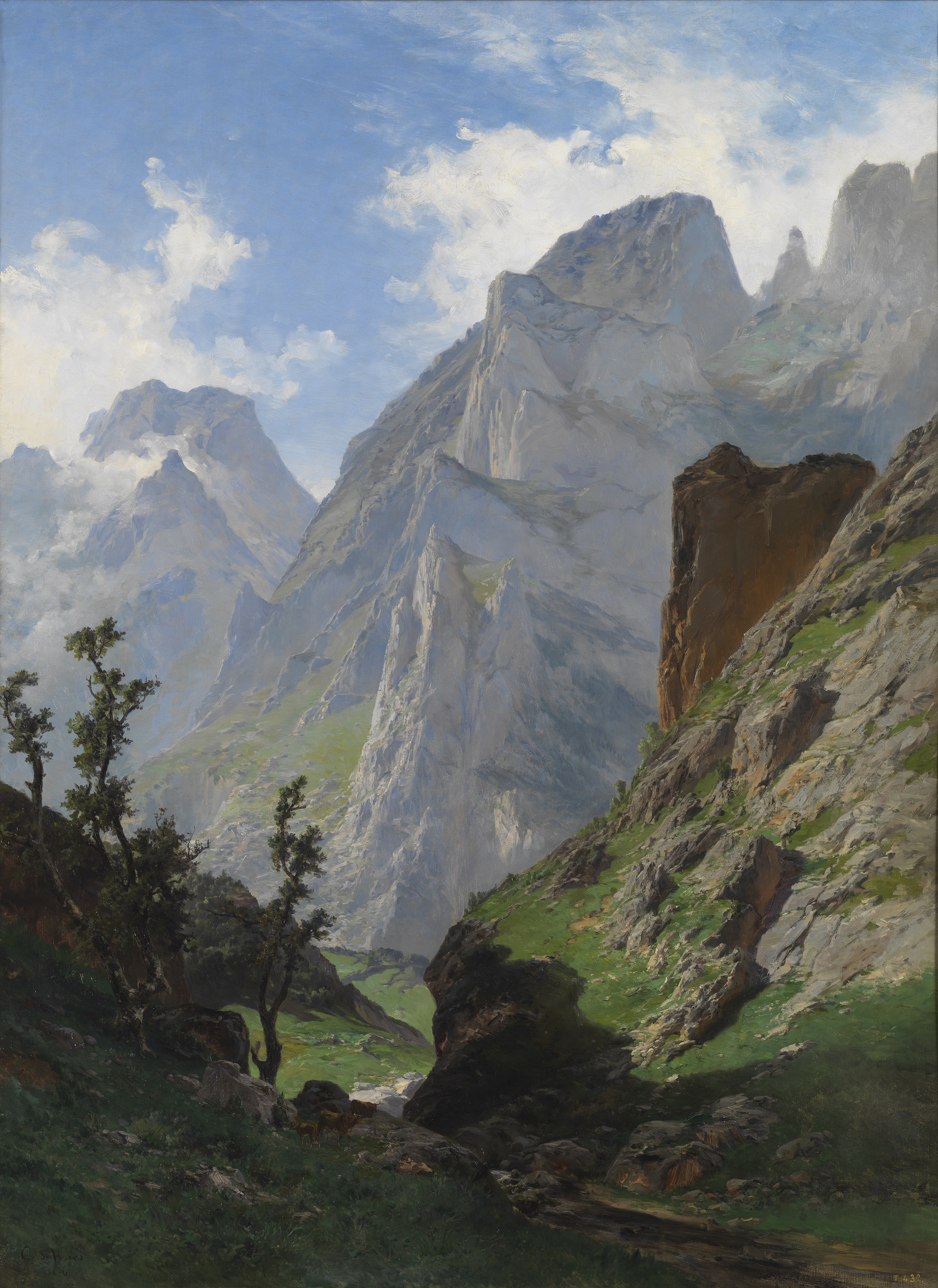
Carlos de Haes, Los Picos de Europa, 1876

In the United States, the Hudson River School, prominent in the middle to late 19th century, is probably the best-known native development in landscape art. These painters created works of mammoth scale that attempted to capture the epic scope of the landscapes that inspired them. The work of Thomas Cole, the school's generally acknowledged founder, has much in common with the philosophical ideals of European landscape paintings – a kind of secular faith in the spiritual benefits to be gained from the contemplation of natural beauty. Some of the later Hudson River School artists, such as Albert Bierstadt, created less comforting works that placed a greater emphasis (with a great deal of Romantic exaggeration) on the raw, even terrifying power of nature. Frederic Edwin Church, a student of Cole, synthesized the ideas of his contemporaries with those of European Old Masters and the writings of John Ruskin and Alexander von Humboldt to become the foremost American landscape painter of the century. The best examples of Canadian landscape art can be found in the works of the Group of Seven, prominent in the 1920s.

Although certainly less dominant in the period after World War I, many significant artists still painted landscapes in the wide variety of styles exemplified by Edvard Munch, Georgia O'Keeffe, Charles E. Burchfield, Neil Welliver, Alex Katz, Milton Avery, Peter Doig, Andrew Wyeth, David Hockney, and Sidney Nolan.

==== Gallery ====
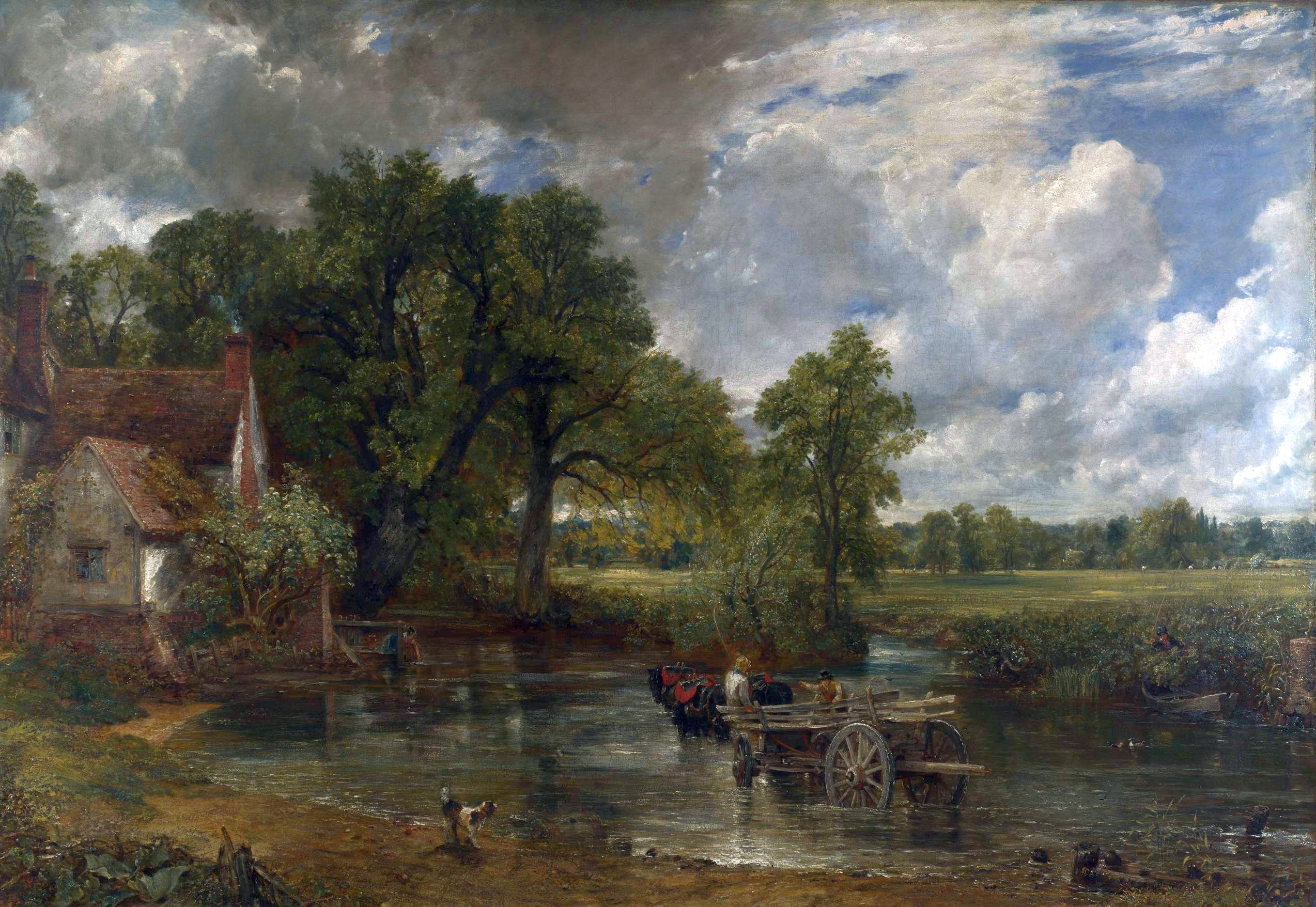
John Constable, 1821, The Hay Wain. Early Romanticism

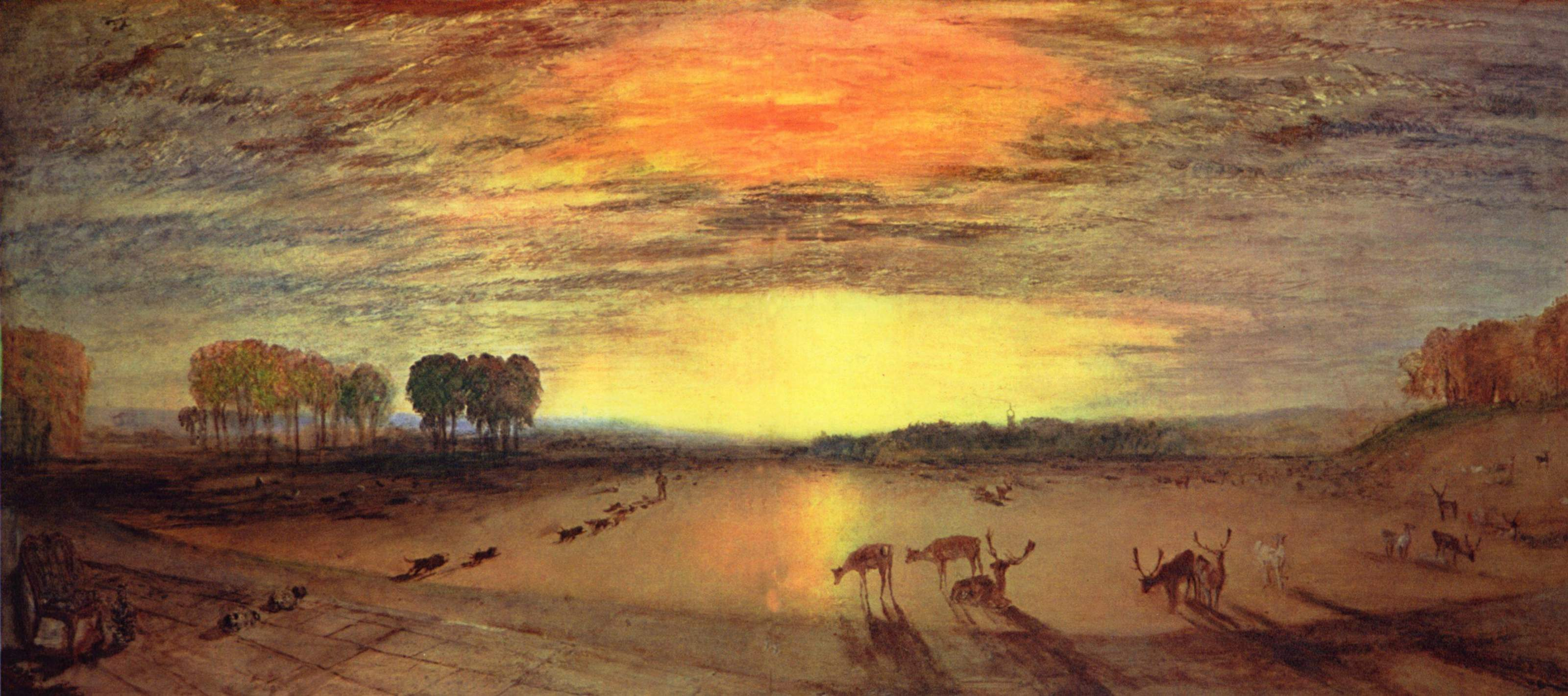
Joseph Mallord William Turner, The Park at Petworth House, c. 1830

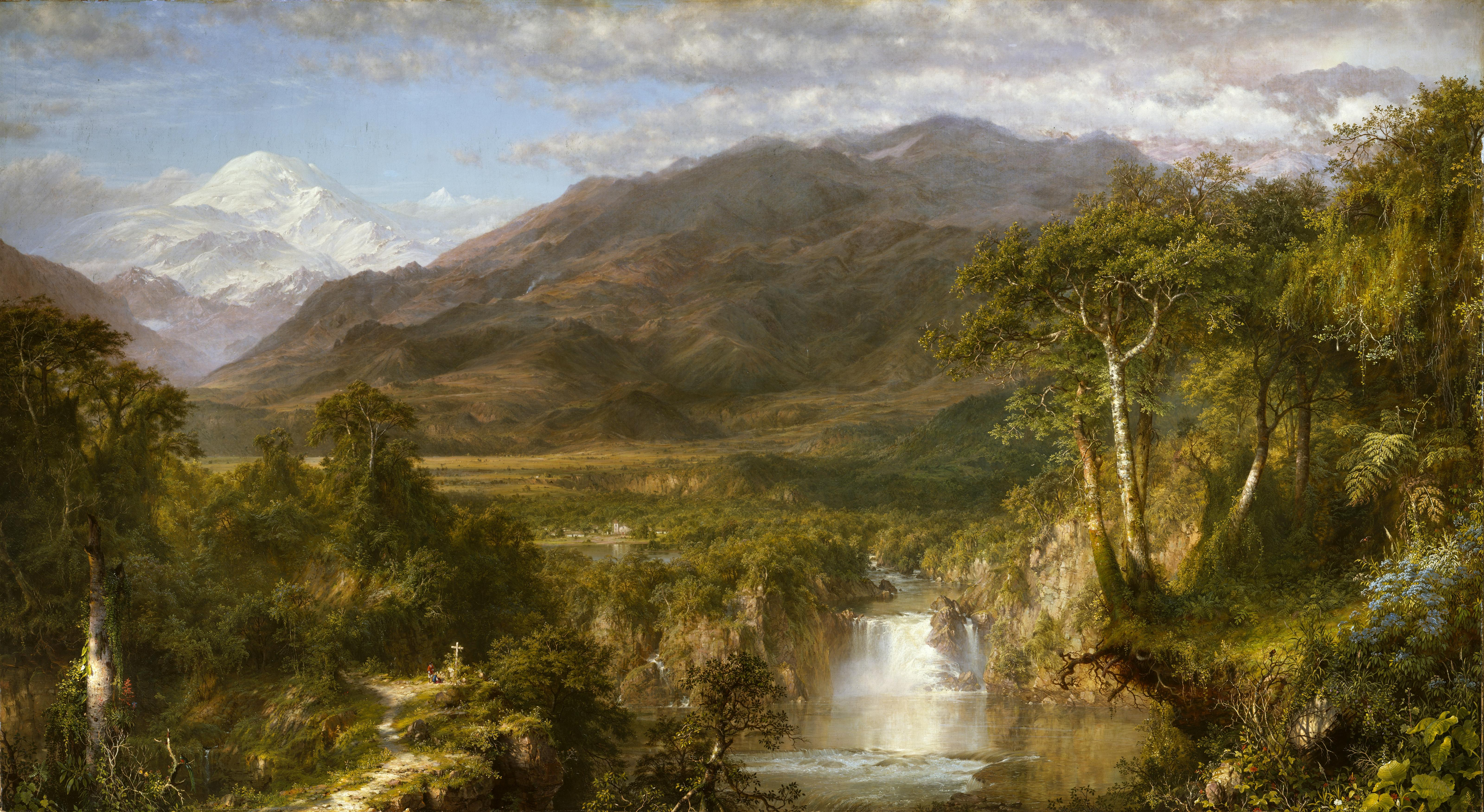
Frederic Edwin Church, The Heart of the Andes, 1859. Church was part of the American Hudson River School.

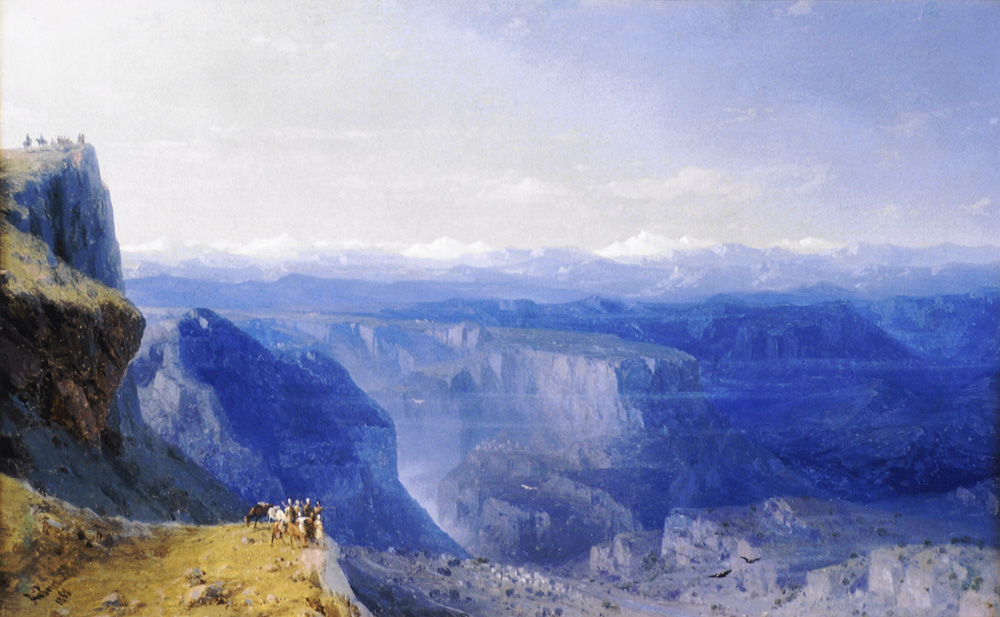
Ivan Aivazovsky, 1863, The Caucasus. Late Romanticism

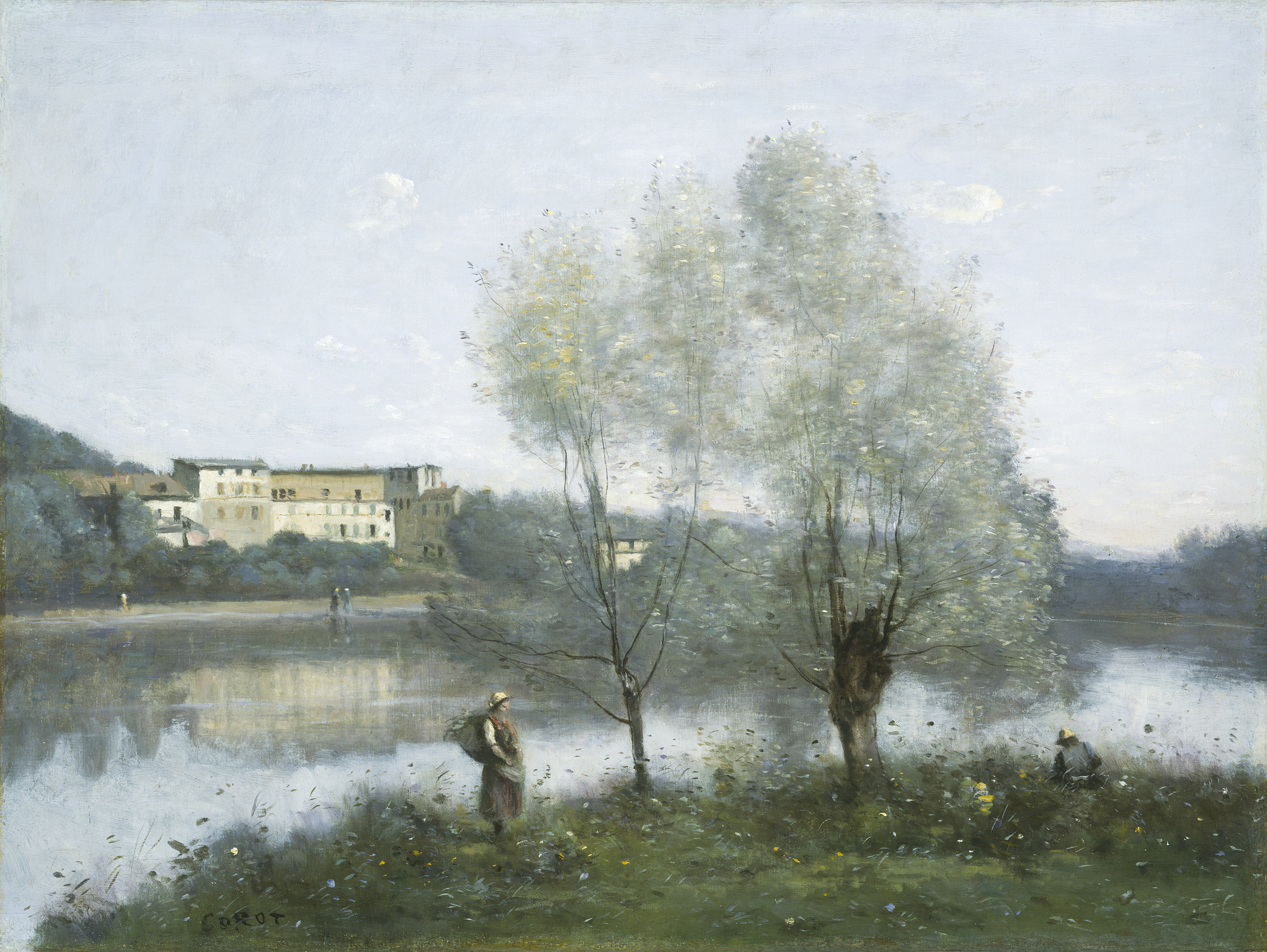
Jean-Baptiste-Camille Corot, c. 1867, Ville d'Avray National Gallery of Art, Washington, DC. Barbizon school

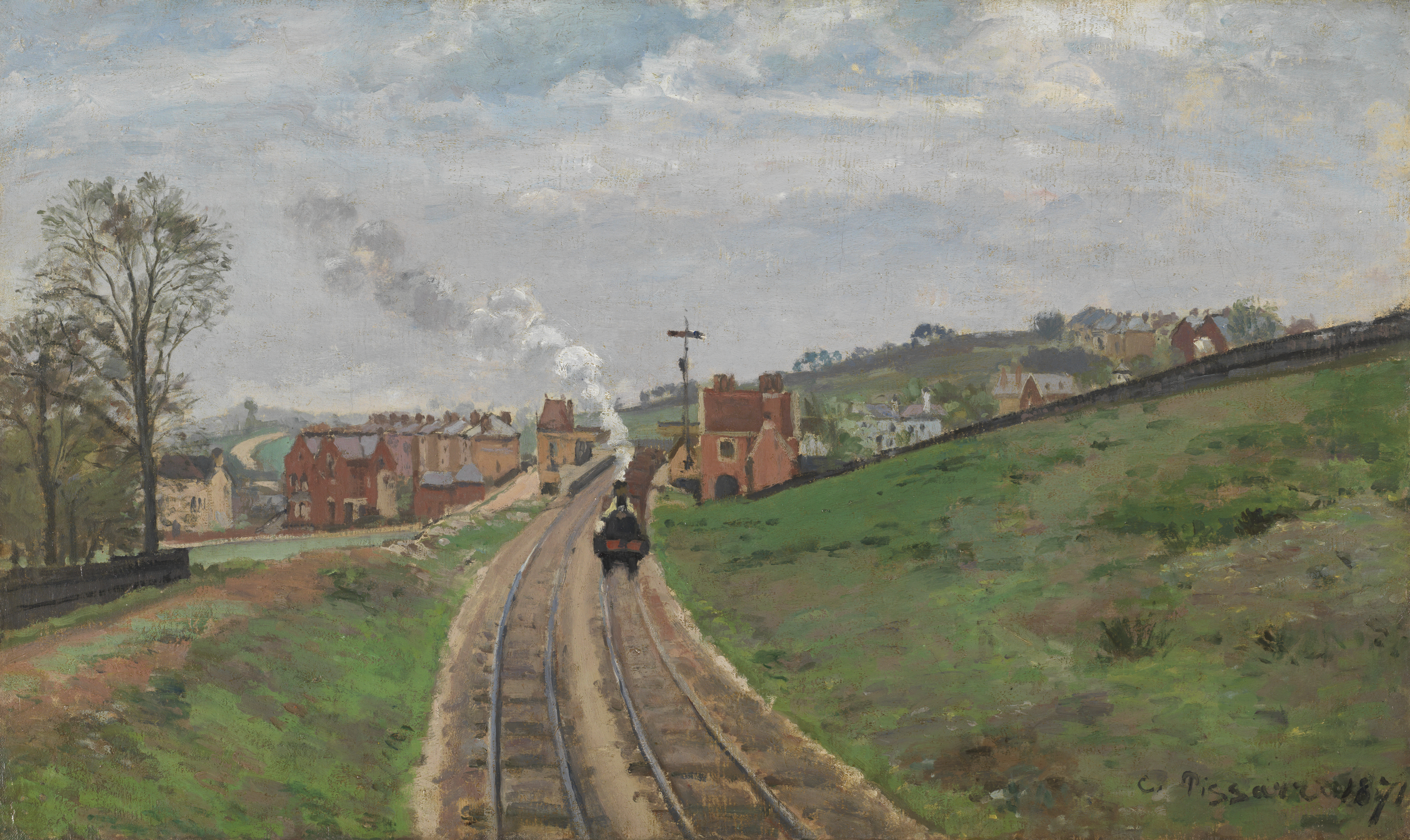
Camille Pissarro, Lordship Lane Station, East Dulwich, London, England, c. 1870. Impressionism.

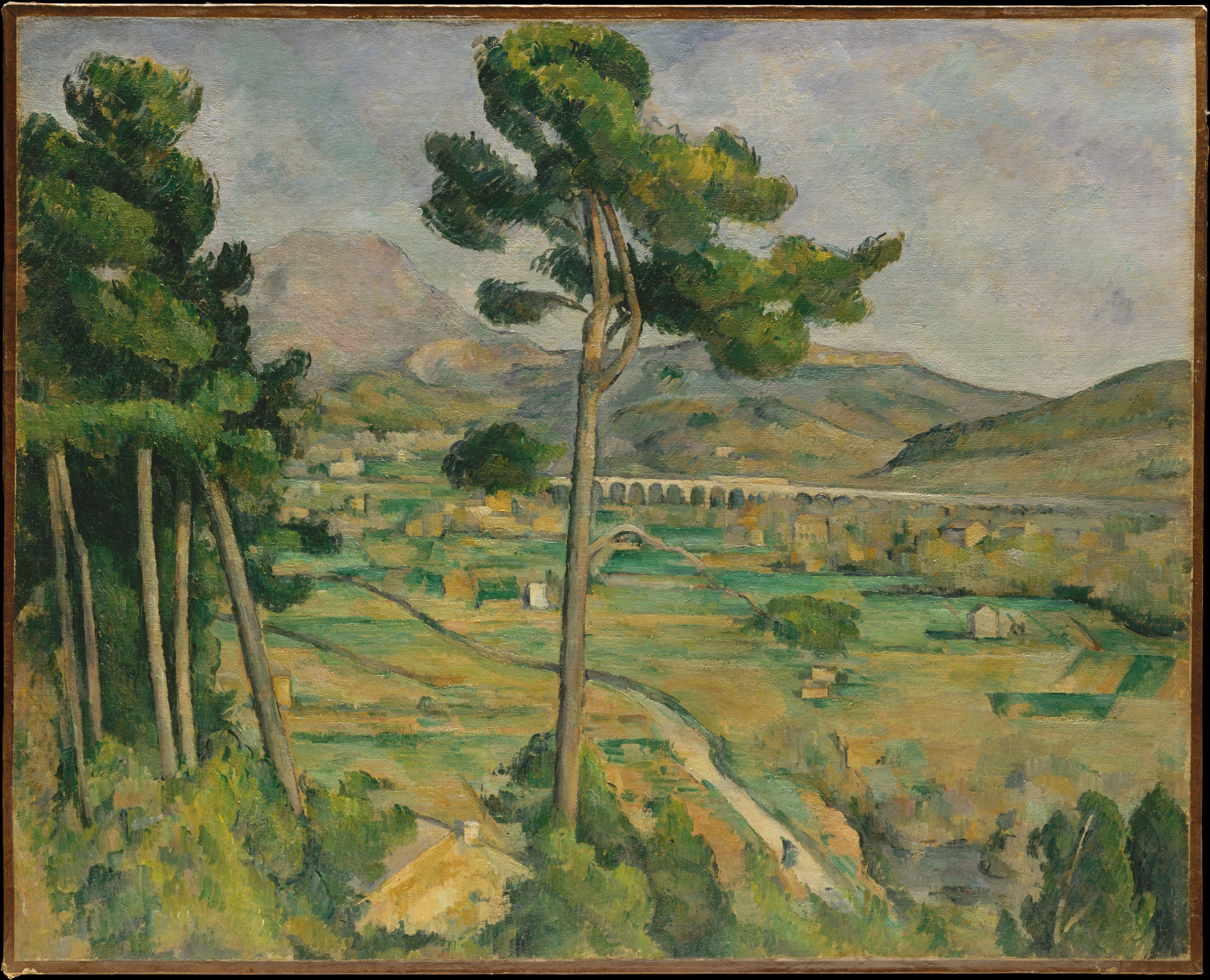
Paul Cézanne, Mont Sainte-Victoire, 1882–1885, Metropolitan Museum of Art. Post-Impressionism

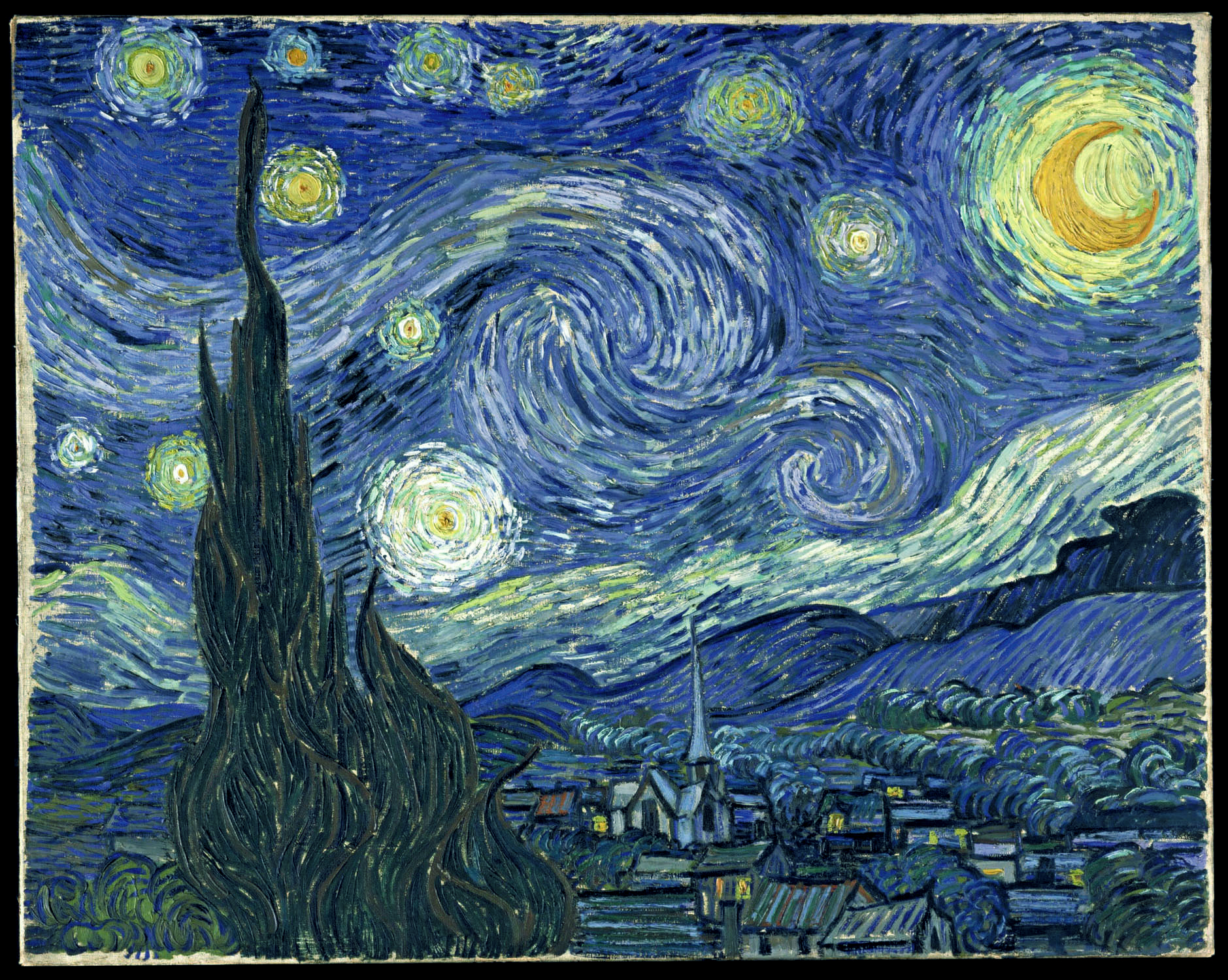
Vincent van Gogh, The Starry Night, 1889, The Museum of Modern Art, New York City. Post-Impressionism

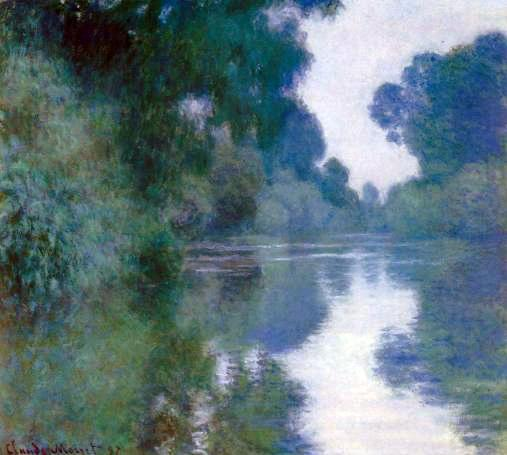
Claude Monet, Branch of the Seine near Giverny, 1897. The Impressionists often, though by no means always, painted en plein air.

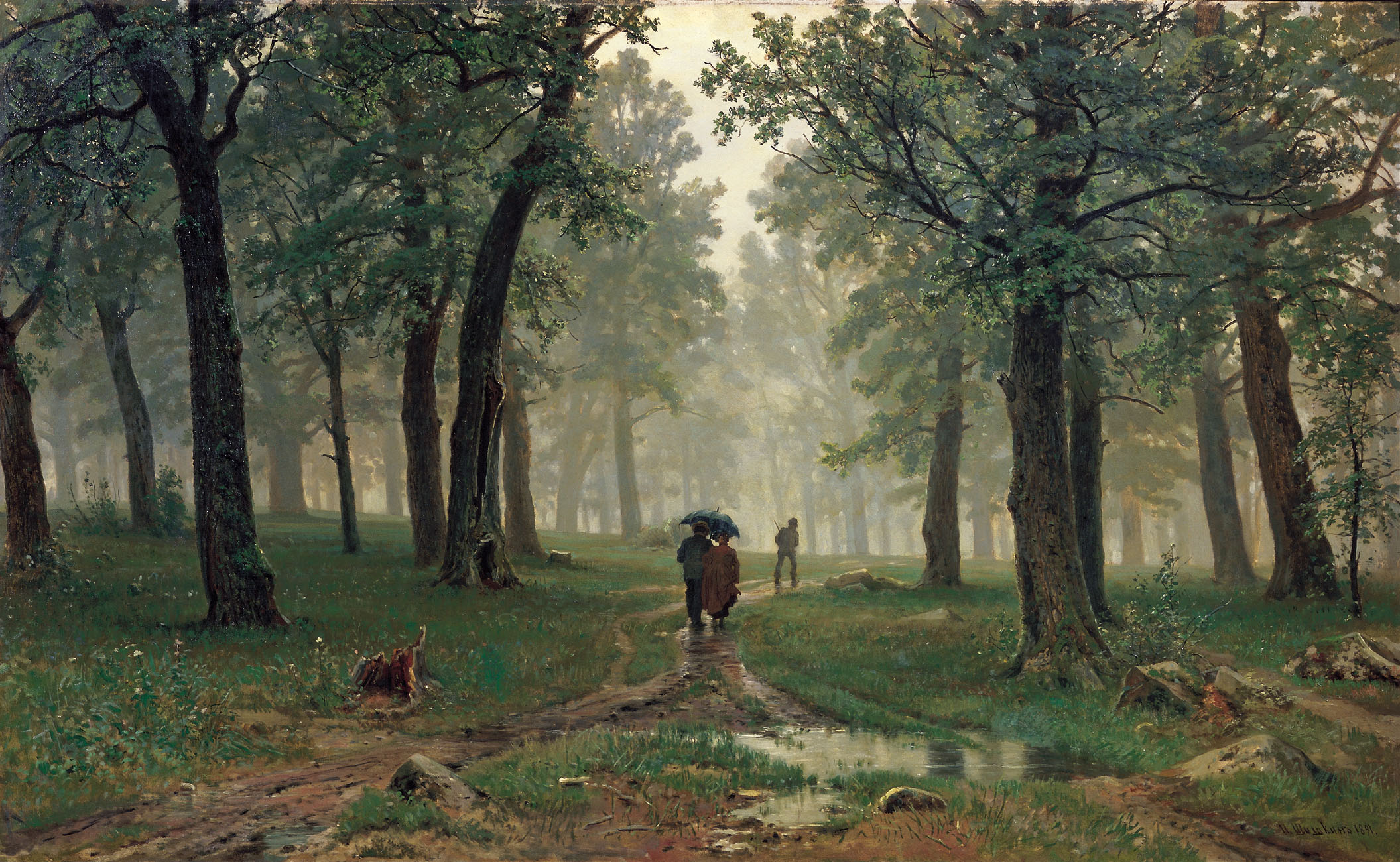
Ivan Shishkin, Rain in an Oak Forest, 1891, Tretyakov Gallery. Peredvizhniki

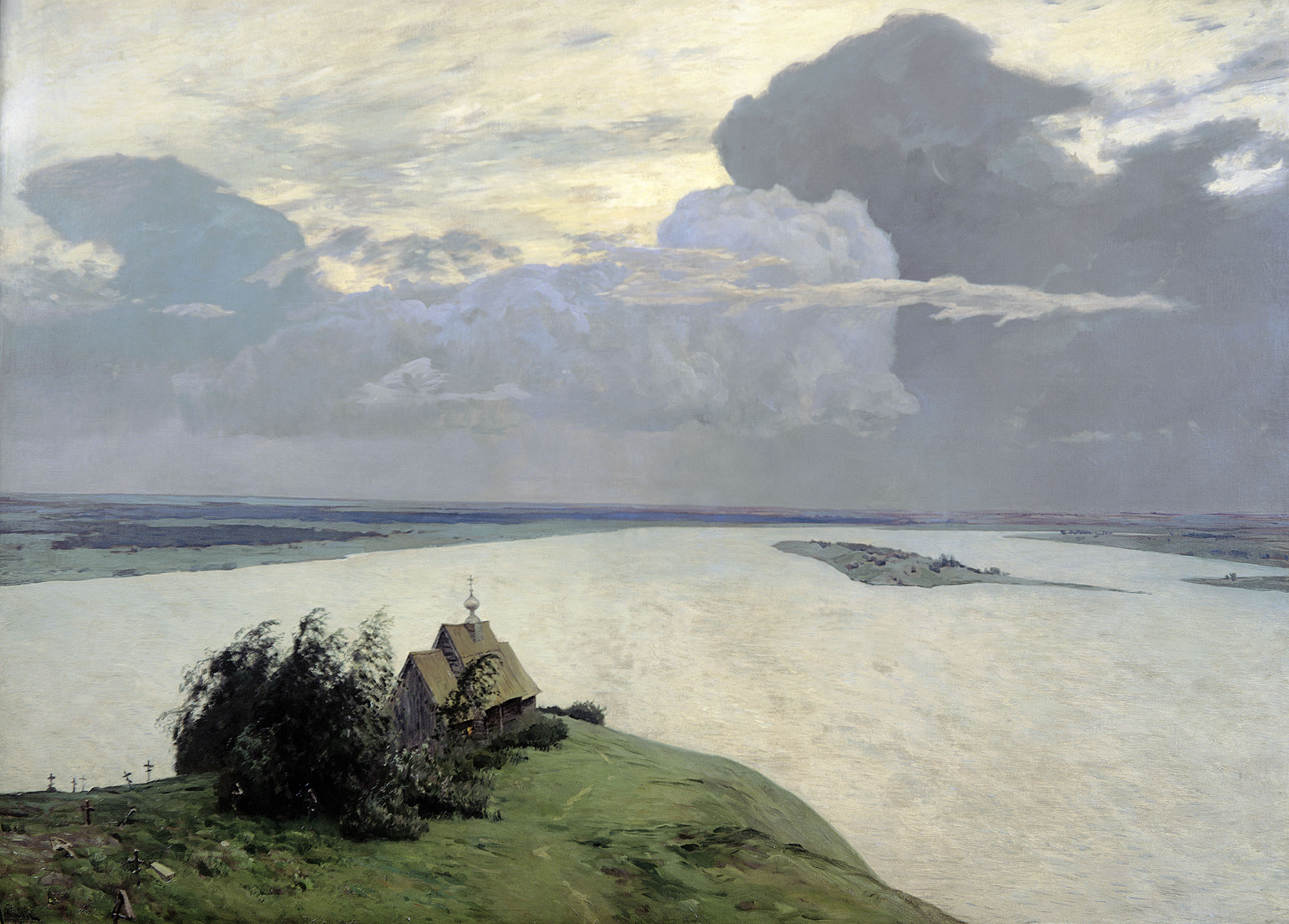
Isaac Levitan, Above Eternal Peace, 1894.

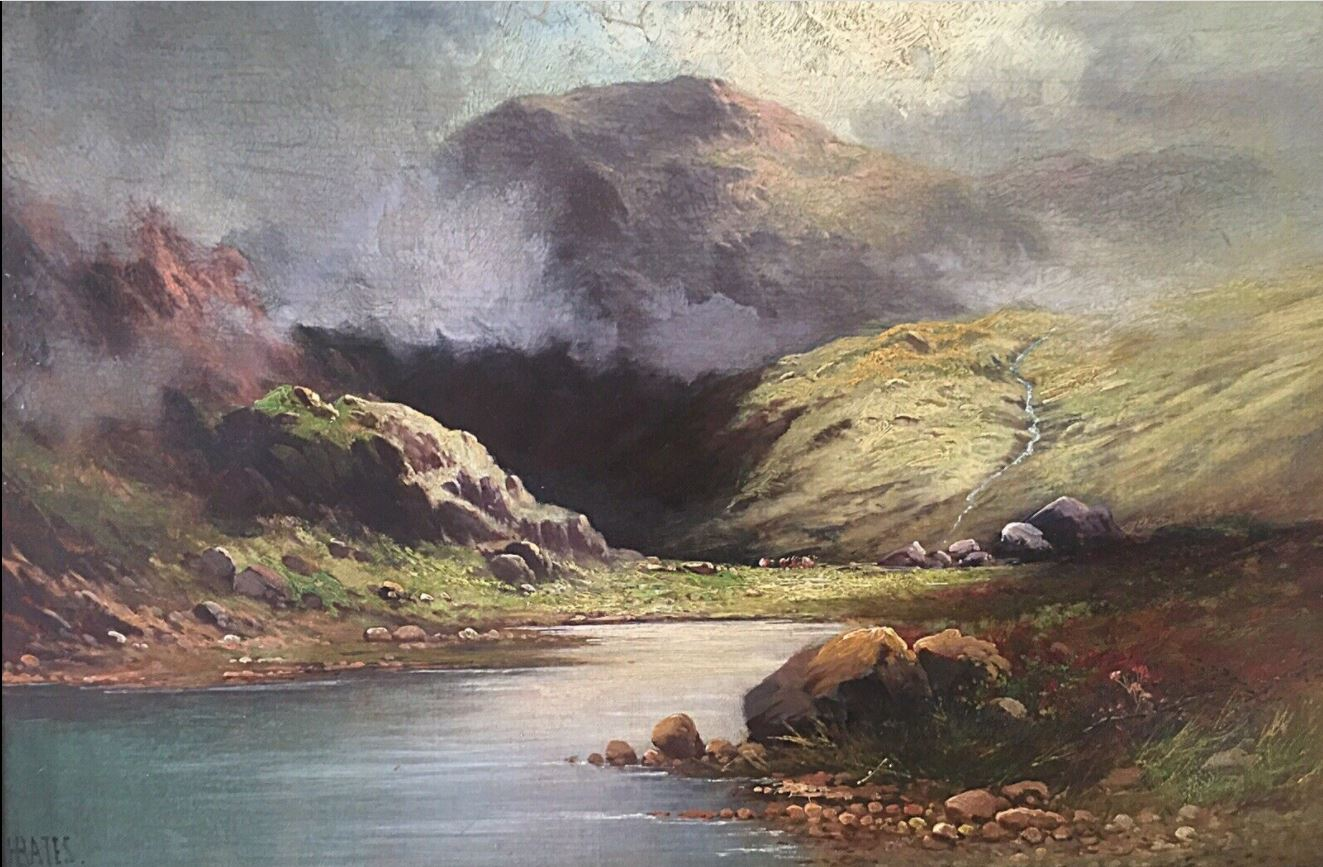
Henry Bates Joel's 1890's 'Scottish Highlands'; a late-romantic stylized interpretation of nature typical of Victorian painting.

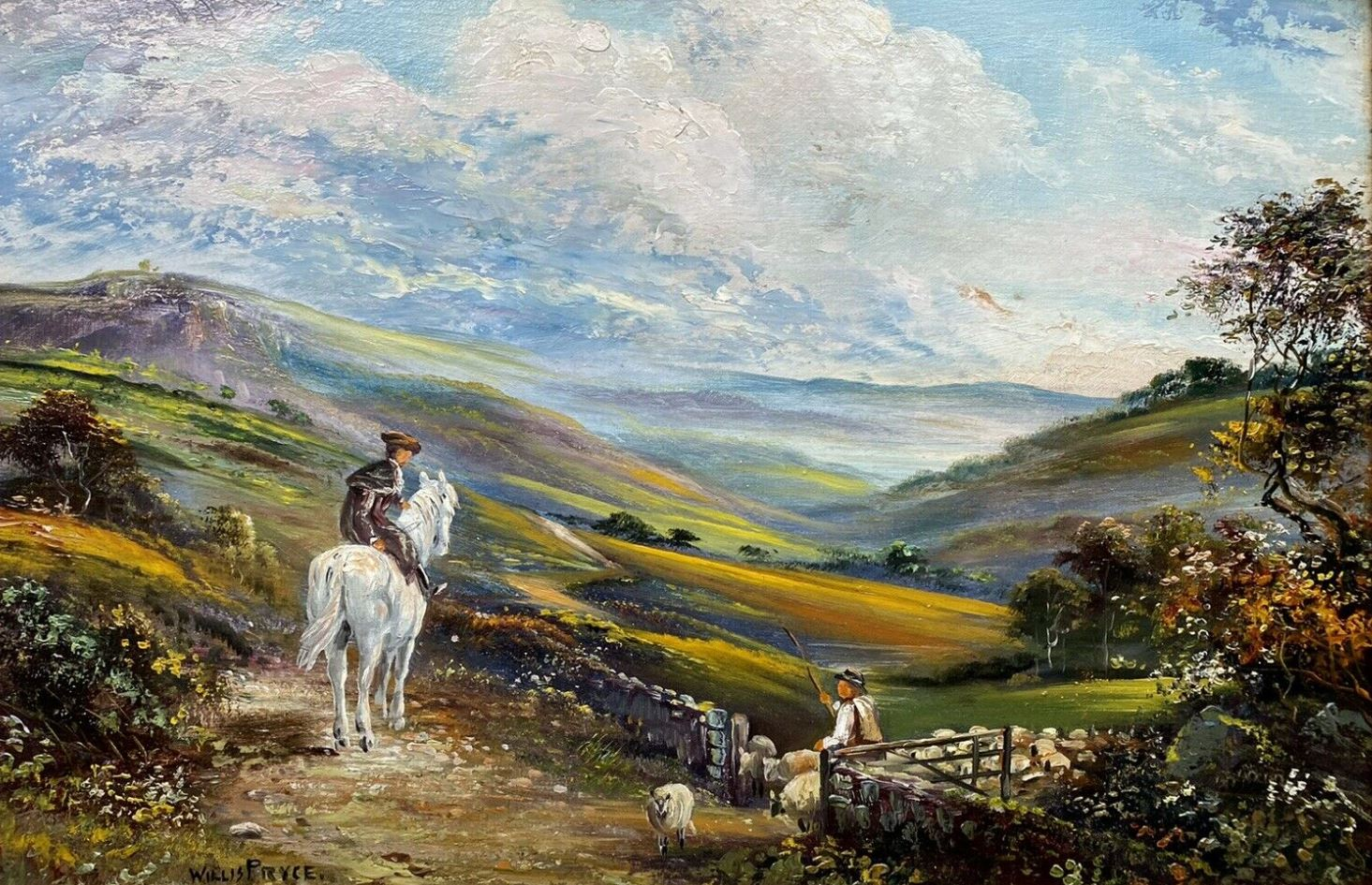
"Giving Directions" by George Willis-Pryce.

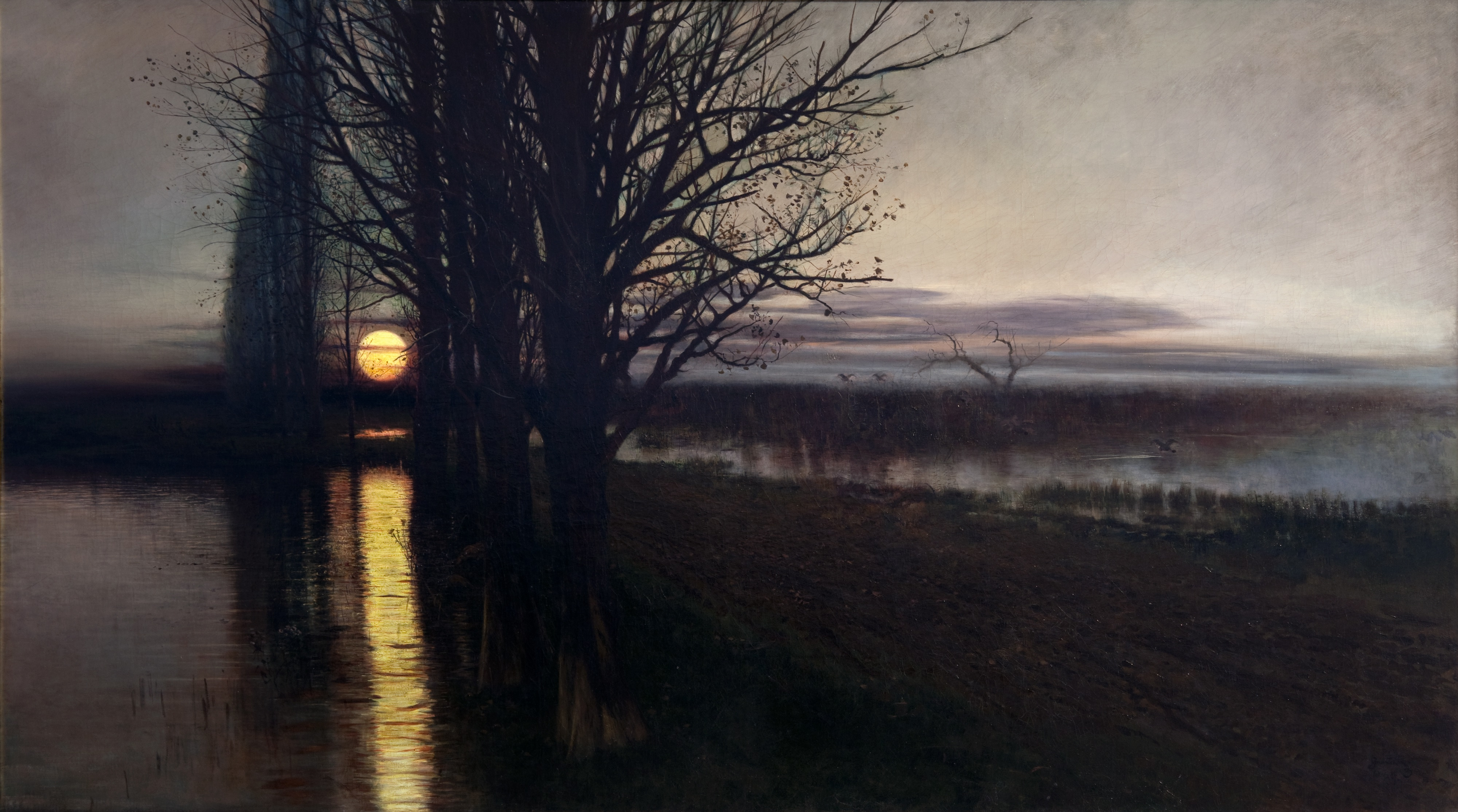
Stanisław Masłowski, Polish landscape painter - Moonrise, 1884, Oil on canvas, National Museum, Kraków, Sukiennice Museum div.

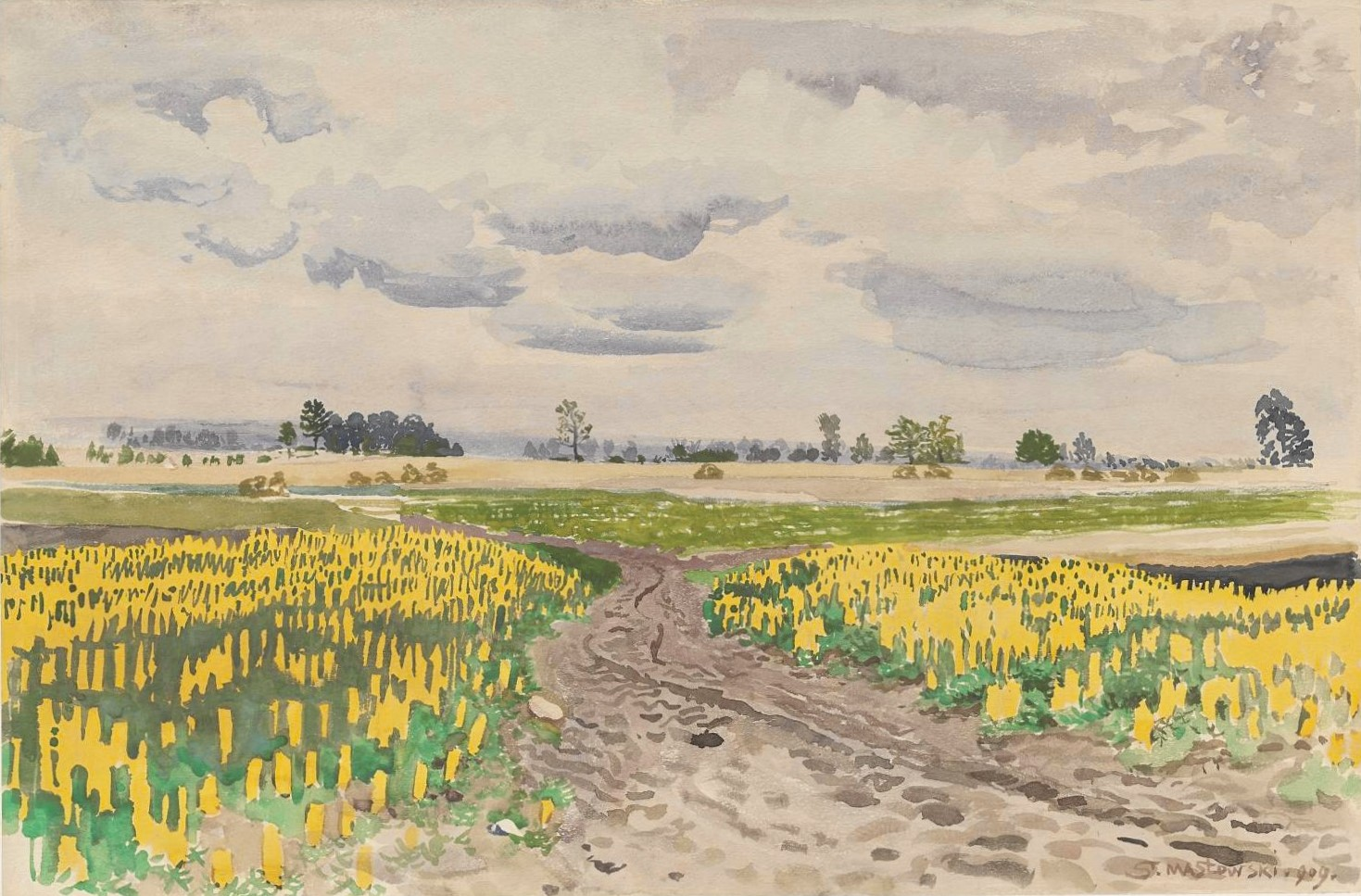
Stanisław Masłowski, Łubin – Droga polna (Lupin – A Cart way), watercolor, 1909 (National Museum in Warsaw)

=== East Asian tradition ===
==== China ====
Court style panorama Along the River During the Qingming Festival, an 18th-century copy of 12th century Song dynasty original by Chinese artist Zhang Zeduan. Zhang's original painting is revered by scholars as "one of Chinese civilization's greatest masterpieces." The scroll begins at the right end, and culminates above as the Emperor boards his yacht to join the festive boats on the river. Note the exceptionally large viewing stones placed at the far edge of the inlet.

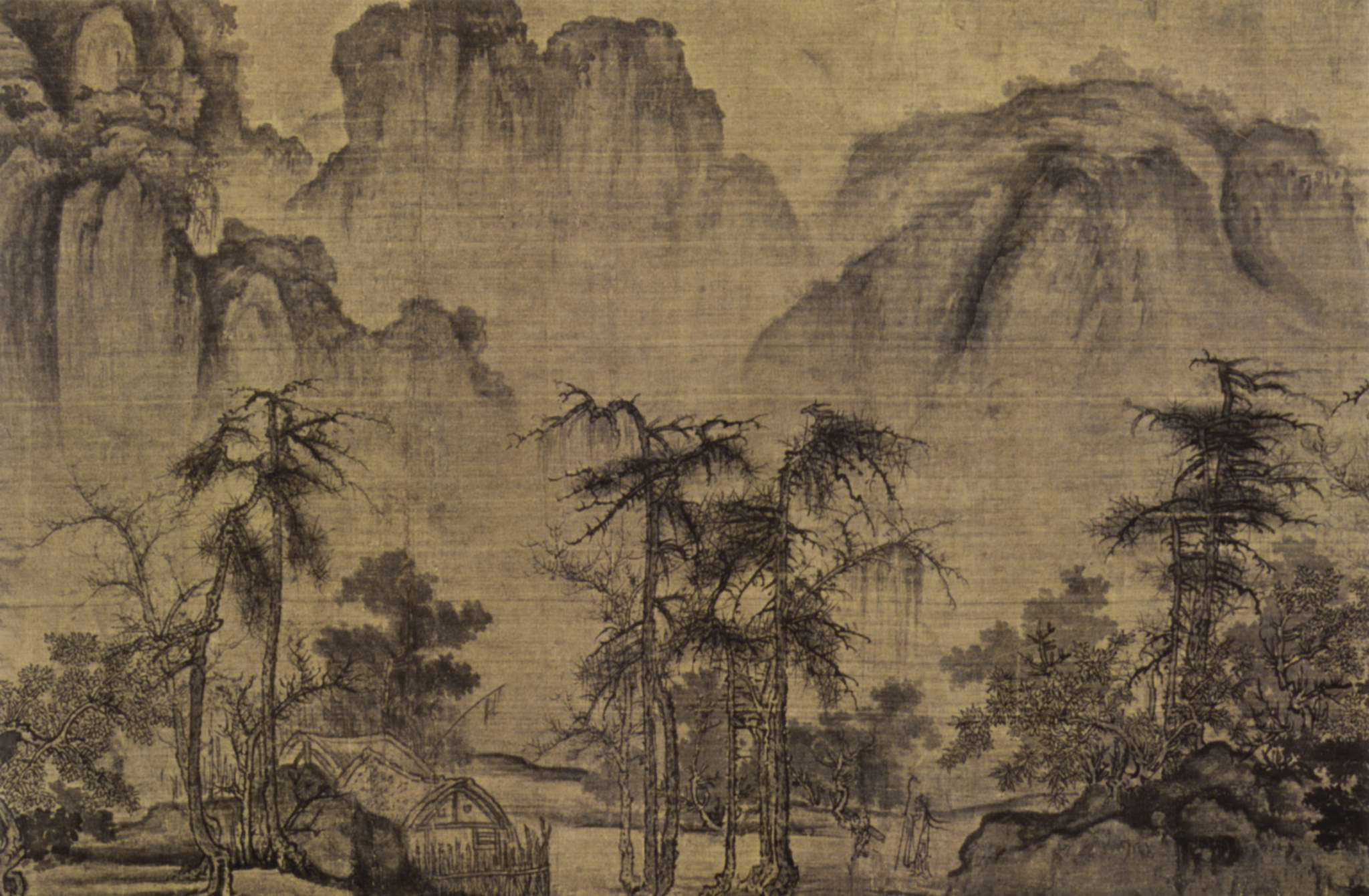
Kuo Hsi (Chinese: 郭熙; pinyin: Guō Xī), Clearing Autumn Skies over Mountains and Valleys, Northern Song dynasty c. 1070, detail from a horizontal scroll.

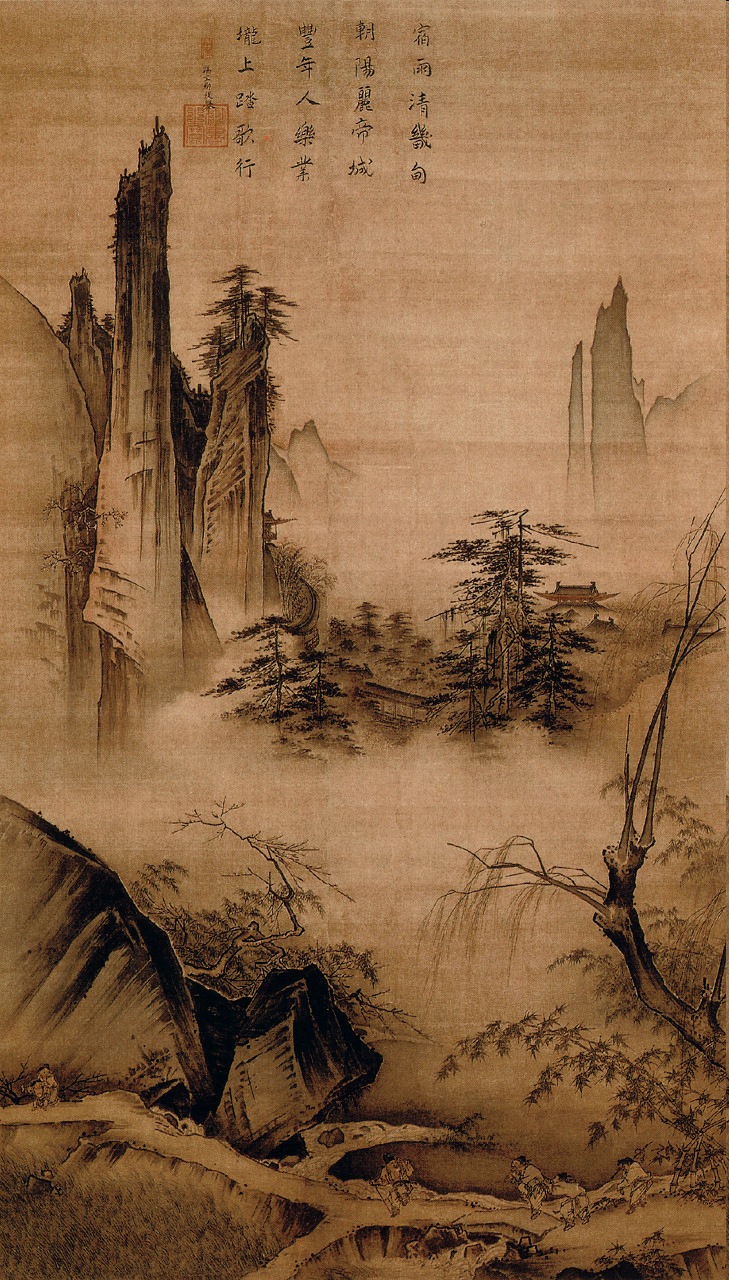
Ma Yuan (Chinese: 馬遠, 1160–1225), Dancing and Singing (Peasants Returning from Work, Chinese: 踏歌圖), 13th century, Southern Song (Chinese), Collected in the Palace Museum.

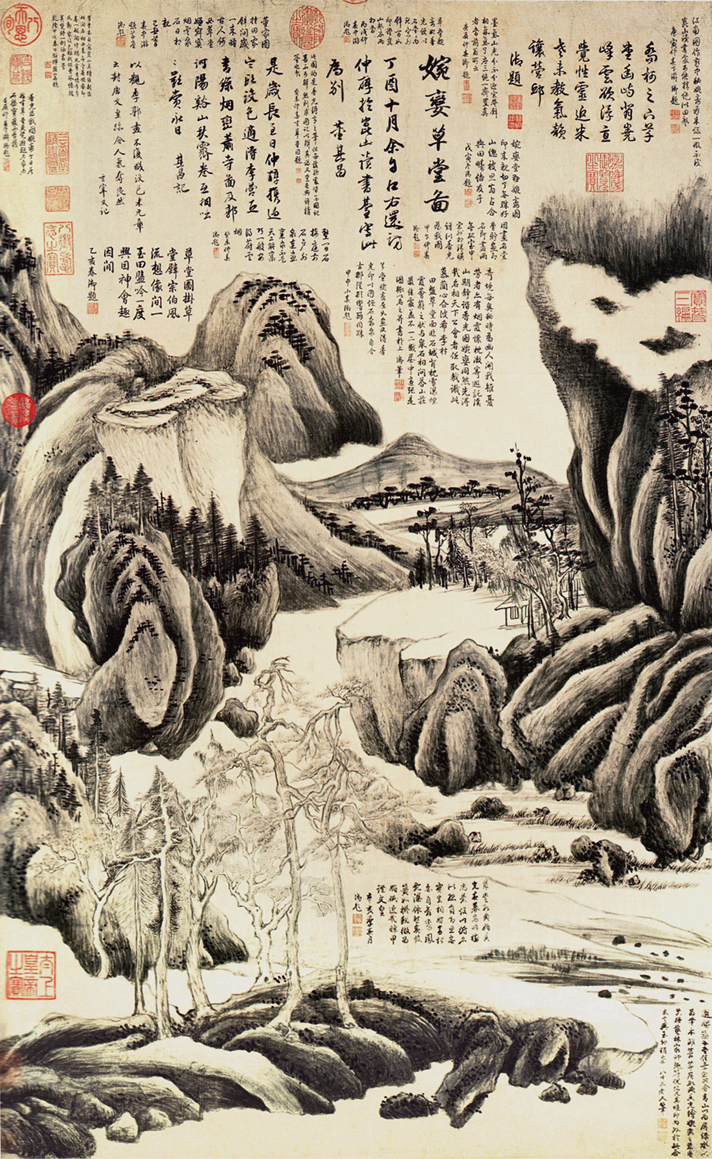
Dong Qichang, Landscape 1597. Dong Qichang was a high-ranking but cantankerous Ming civil servant, who valued expressiveness over delicacy, with collector's seals and poems.

Landscape painting has been called "China's greatest contribution to the art of the world", and owes its special character to the Taoist (Daoist) tradition in Chinese culture. William Watson notes that "It has been said that the role of landscape art in Chinese painting corresponds to that of the nude in the west, as a theme unvarying in itself, but made the vehicle of infinite nuances of vision and feeling".

There are increasingly sophisticated landscape backgrounds to figure subjects showing hunting, farming, or animals from the Han dynasty onward, with surviving examples mostly in stone or clay reliefs from tombs, which are presumed to follow the prevailing styles in painting, no doubt without capturing the full effect of the original paintings. The exact status of the later copies of reputed works by famous painters (many of whom are recorded in literature) before the 10th century is unclear. One example is a famous 8th-century painting from the Imperial collection, titled The Emperor Ming Huang traveling in Shu. This shows the entourage riding through vertiginous mountains of the type typical of later paintings, but is in full colour "producing an overall pattern that is almost Persian", in what was evidently a popular and fashionable court style.

The decisive shift to a monochrome landscape style, almost devoid of figures, is attributed to Wang Wei (699–759), also famous as a poet; mostly only copies of his works survive. From the 10th century onward an increasing number of original paintings survive, and the best works of the Song dynasty (960–1279) Southern School remain among the most highly regarded in what has been an uninterrupted tradition to the present day. Chinese convention valued the paintings of the amateur scholar-gentleman, often a poet as well, over those produced by professionals, though the situation was more complex than that. If they include any figures, they are very often such persons, or sages, contemplating the mountains. Famous works have accumulated numbers of red "appreciation seals", and often poems added by later owners – the Qianlong Emperor (1711–1799) was a prolific adder of his own poems, following earlier Emperors.

The shan shui tradition was never intended to represent actual locations, even when named after them, as in the convention of the Eight Views. A different style, produced by workshops of professional court artists, painted official views of Imperial tours and ceremonies, with the primary emphasis on highly detailed scenes of crowded cities and grand ceremonials from a high viewpoint. These were painted on scrolls of enormous length in bright colour (example below).

Chinese sculpture also achieves the difficult feat of creating effective landscapes in three dimensions. There is a long tradition of the appreciation of "viewing stones" – naturally formed boulders, typically limestone from the banks of mountain rivers that has been eroded into fantastic shapes, were transported to the courtyards and gardens of the literati. Probably associated with these is the tradition of carving much smaller boulders of jade or some other semi-precious stone into the shape of a mountain, including tiny figures of monks or sages. Chinese gardens also developed a highly sophisticated aesthetic much earlier than those in the West; the karensansui or Japanese dry garden of Zen Buddhism takes the garden even closer to being a work of sculpture, representing a highly abstracted landscape.

Li Cheng (Chinese: 李成; pinyin: Lǐ Chéng; Wade–Giles: Li Ch'eng; 919–967), Luxuriant Forest among Distant Peaks, detail, Liaoning Provincial Museum, 10th century China

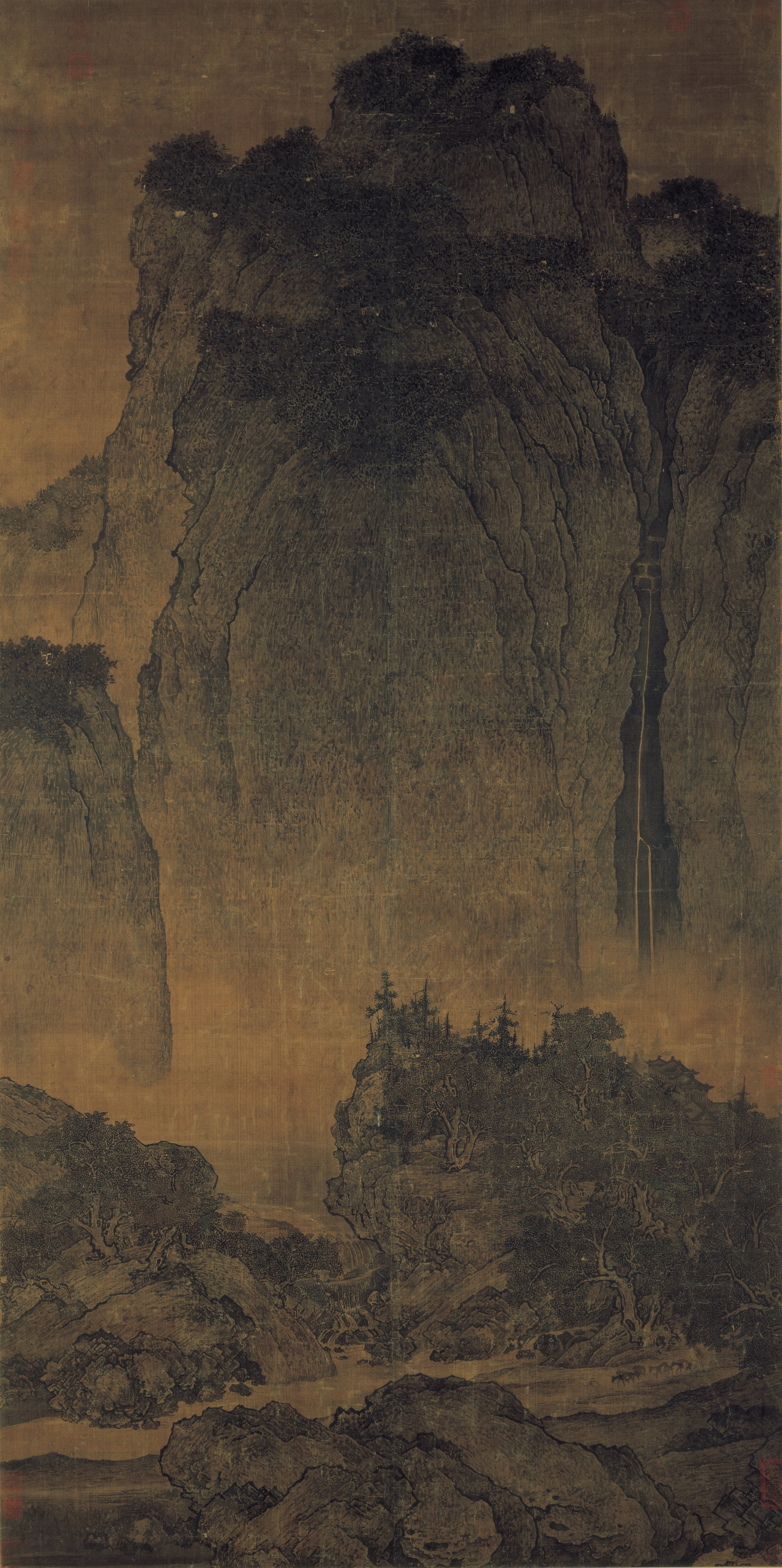
Fan Kuan (Chinese: 范寬; pinyin: Fàn Kuān; Wade–Giles: Fan K'uan, c. 960 – c. 1030), Travellers among Mountains and Streams (谿山行旅), ink and slight color on silk, dimensions of 6¾ ft x 2½ ft. 11th century, China. National Palace Museum, Taipei

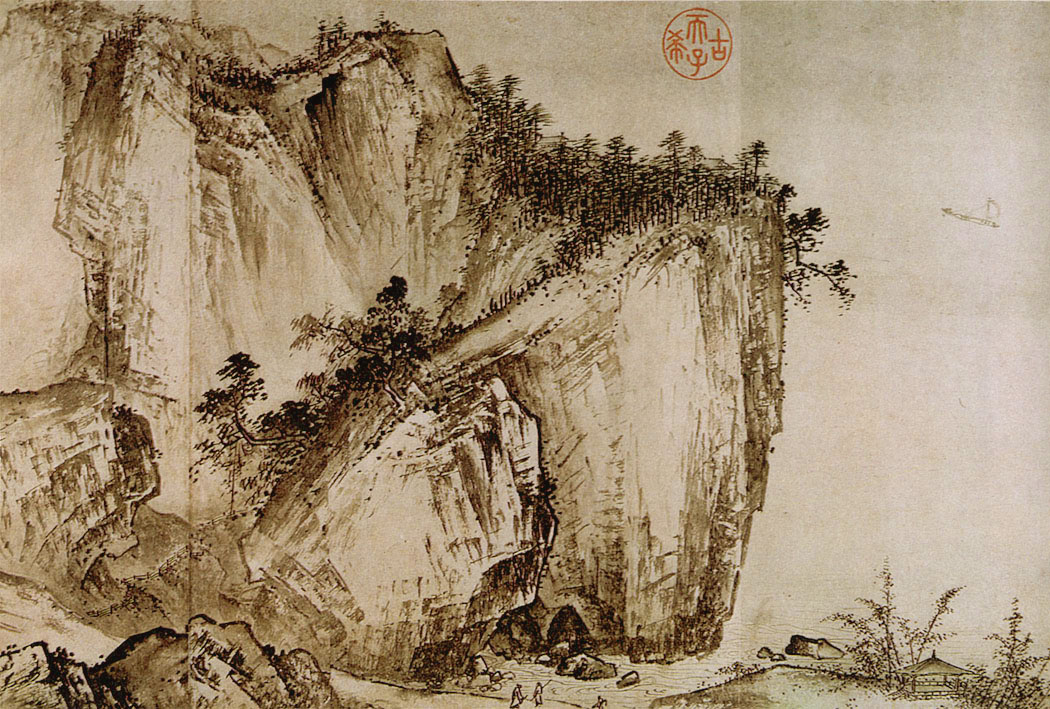
Detail from the hand scroll Pure and Remote View of Streams and Mountains, one of Xia Gui's most important works, 13th century China

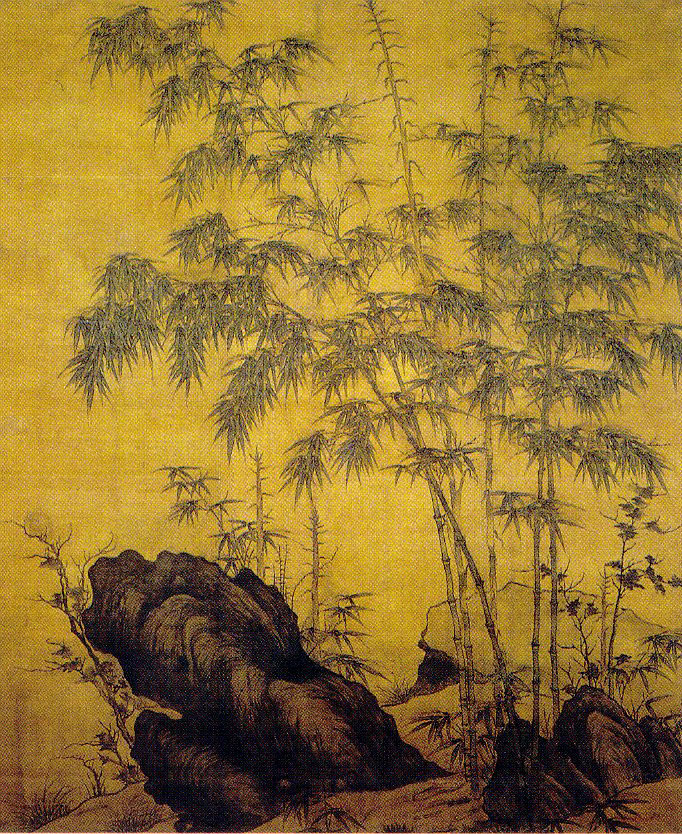
Li Kan, Bamboos and Rock c. 1300 AD., China

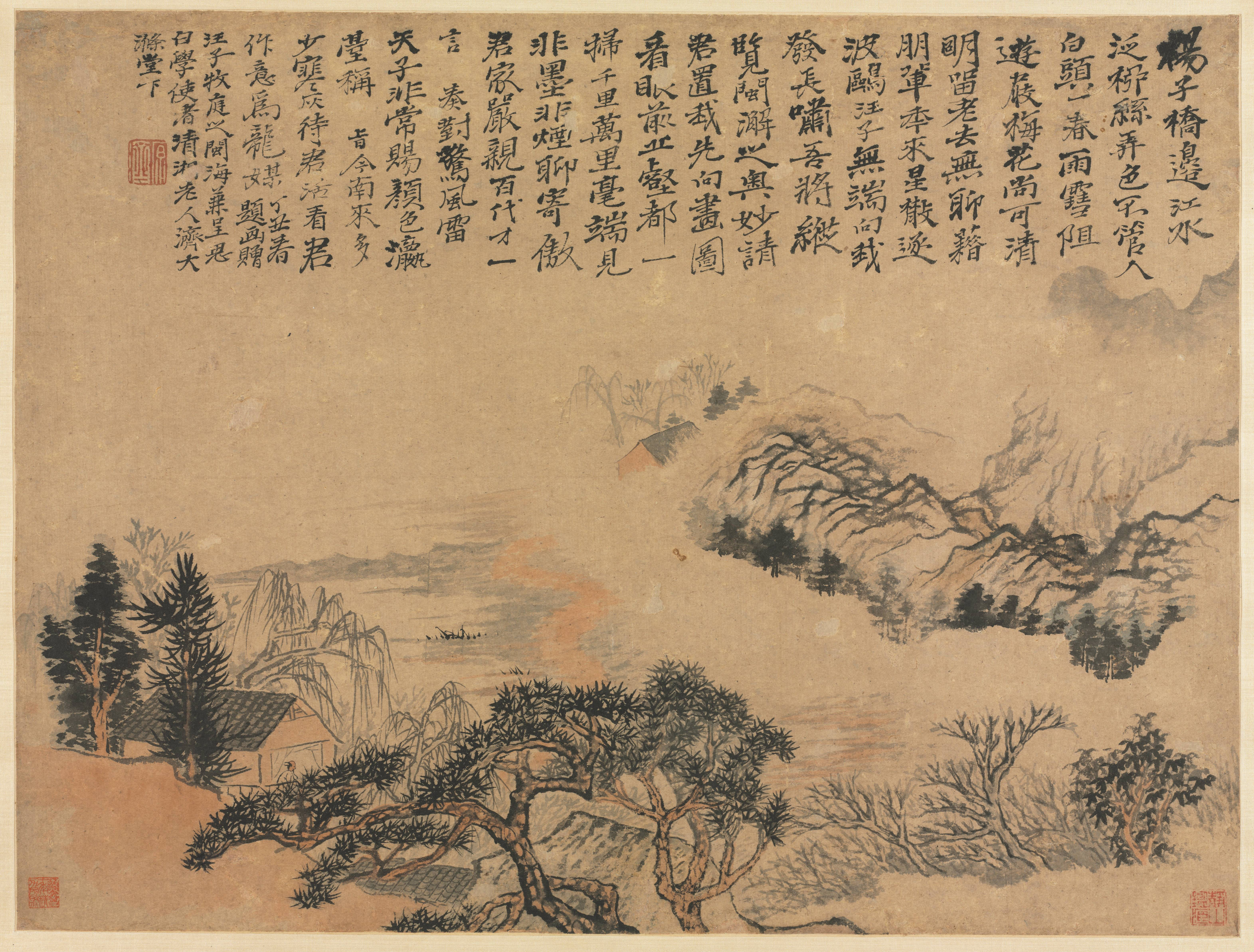
Tao Chi, late 17th century China

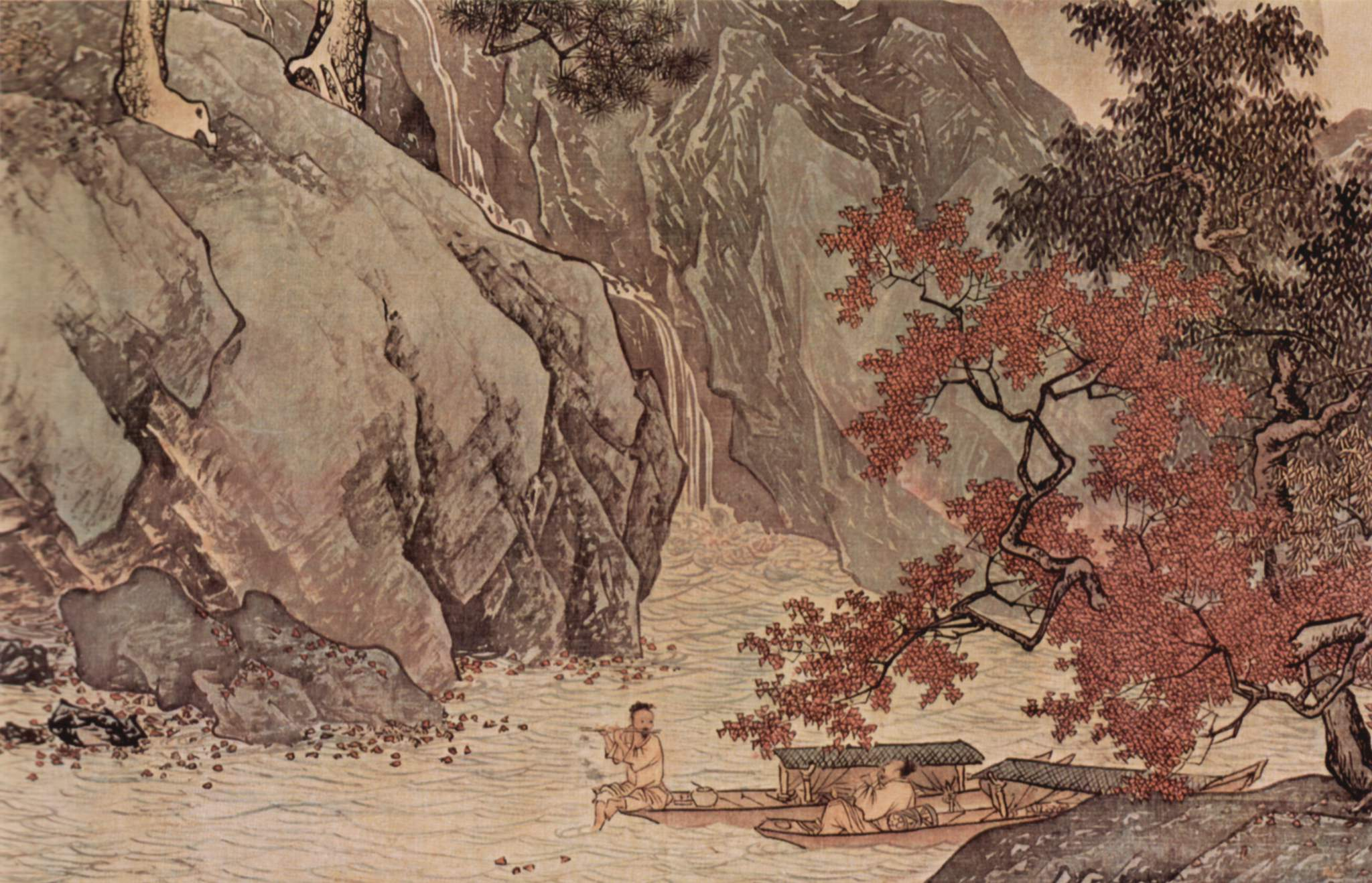
Tang Yin, A Fisher in Autumn, 1523 AD., China

Shen Zhou, Poet on a Mountain c. 1500. Painting and poem by Shen Zhou: "White clouds encircle the mountain waist like a sash,/Stone steps mount high into the void where the narrow path leads far./Alone, leaning on my rustic staff I gaze idly into the distance./My longing for the notes of a flute is answered in the murmurings of the gorge."

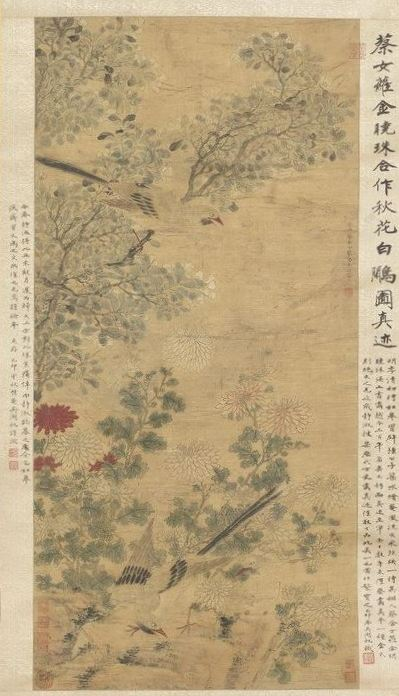
Cai Han and Jin Xiaozhu, Autumn Flowers and White Pheasants, 17th century, China.

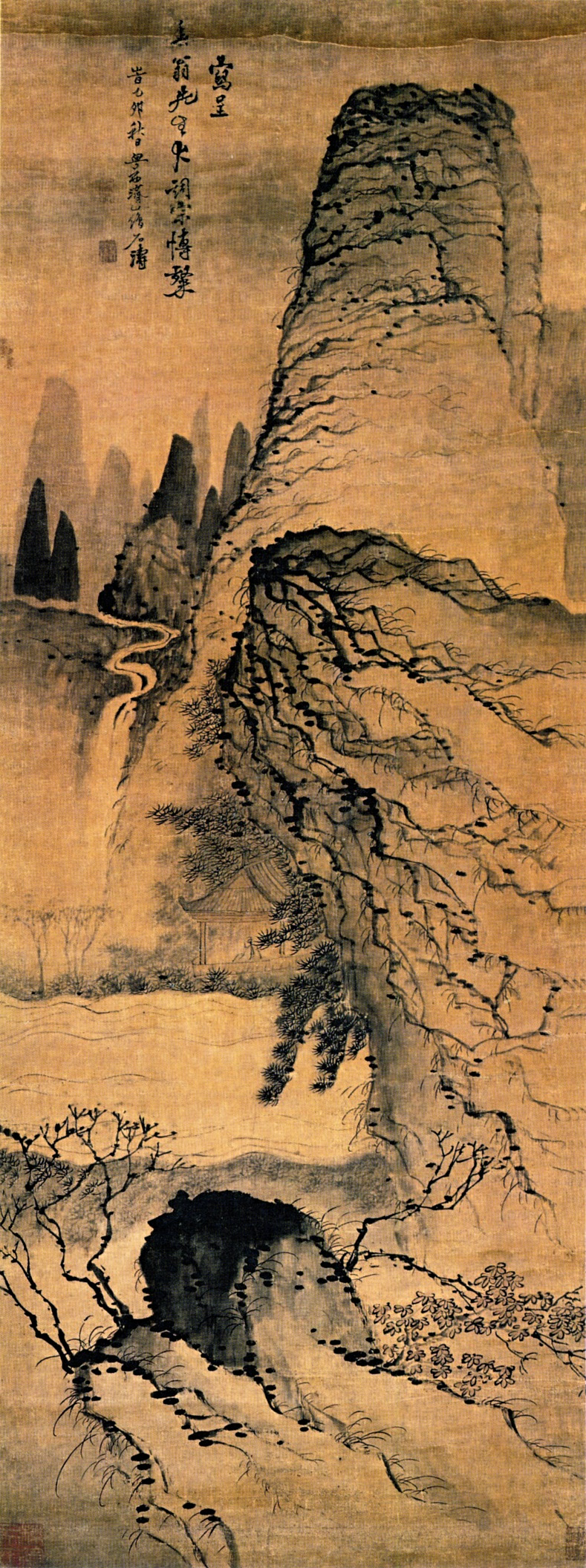
Shitao, Pine Pavilion Near a Spring, 1675, collection of the Shanghai Museum, 17th century, China.

==== Japan ====
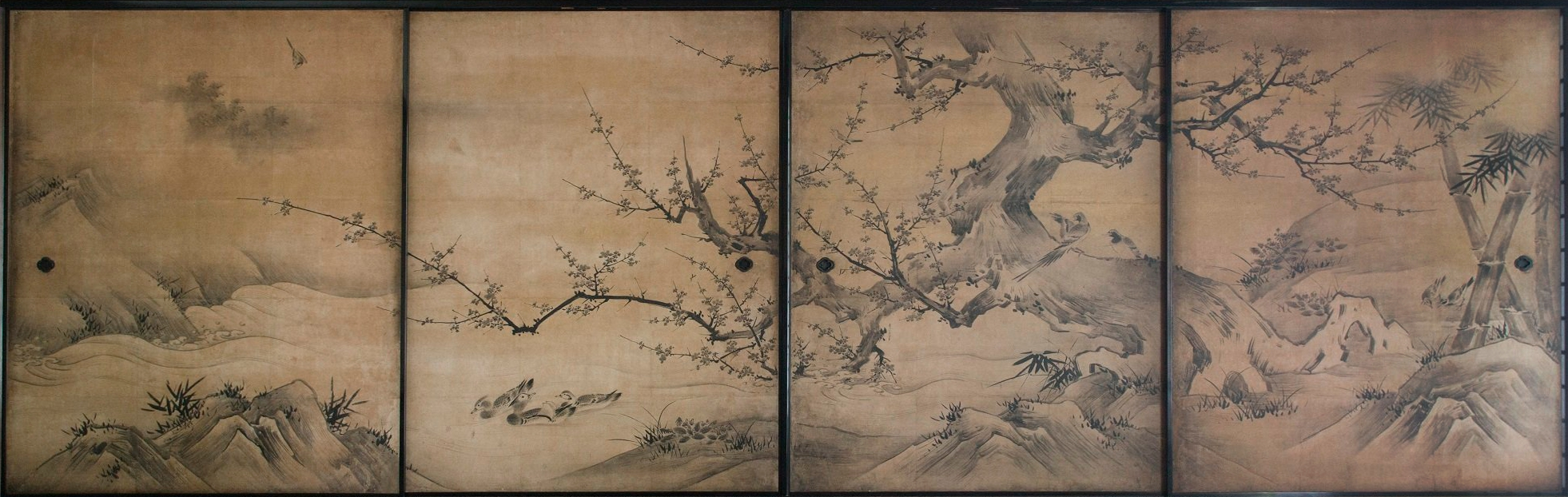
Four from a set of sixteen sliding room partitions made for a 16th-century Japanese abbot. Typically for later Japanese landscapes, the main focus is on a feature in the foreground.

Japanese art initially adapted Chinese styles to reflect their interest in narrative themes in art, with scenes set in landscapes mixing with those showing palace or city scenes using the same high view point, cutting away roofs as necessary. These appeared in the very long yamato-e scrolls of scenes illustrating the Tale of Genji and other subjects, mostly from the 12th and 13th centuries. The concept of the gentleman-amateur painter had little resonance in feudal Japan, where artists were generally professionals with a strong bond to their master and his school, rather than the classic artists from the distant past, from which Chinese painters tended to draw their inspiration. Painting was initially fully coloured, often brightly so, and the landscape never overwhelms the figures who are often rather oversized.

The scene from the Biography of the Priest Ippen illustrated below is from a scroll that in full measures 37.8 cm × 802.0 cm, for only one of twelve scrolls illustrating the life of a Buddhist monk; like their Western counterparts, monasteries and temples commissioned many such works, and these have had a better chance of survival than courtly equivalents. Even rarer are survivals of landscape byōbu folding screens and hanging scrolls, which seem to have common in court circles – the Tale of Genji has an episode where members of the court produce the best paintings from their collections for a competition. These were closer to Chinese shan shui, but still fully coloured.

Many more pure landscape subjects survive from the 15th century onward; several key artists are Zen Buddhist clergy, and worked in a monochrome style with greater emphasis on brush strokes in the Chinese manner. Some schools adopted a less refined style, with smaller views giving greater emphasis to the foreground. A type of image that had an enduring appeal for Japanese artists, and came to be called the "Japanese style", is in fact first found in China. This combines one or more large birds, animals, or trees in the foreground, typically to one side in a horizontal composition, with a wider landscape beyond, often only covering portions of the background. Later versions of this style often dispensed with a landscape background altogether.

The ukiyo-e style that developed from the 16th century onward, first in painting and then in coloured woodblock prints that were cheap and widely available, initially concentrated on the human figure, individually and in groups. But from the late 18th century landscape ukiyo-e developed under Hokusai and Hiroshige to become much the best known type of Japanese landscape art.

Tenshō Shūbun, a Zen Buddhist monk, an early figure in the revival of Chinese styles in Japan. Reading in a Bamboo Grove, 1446, Japan

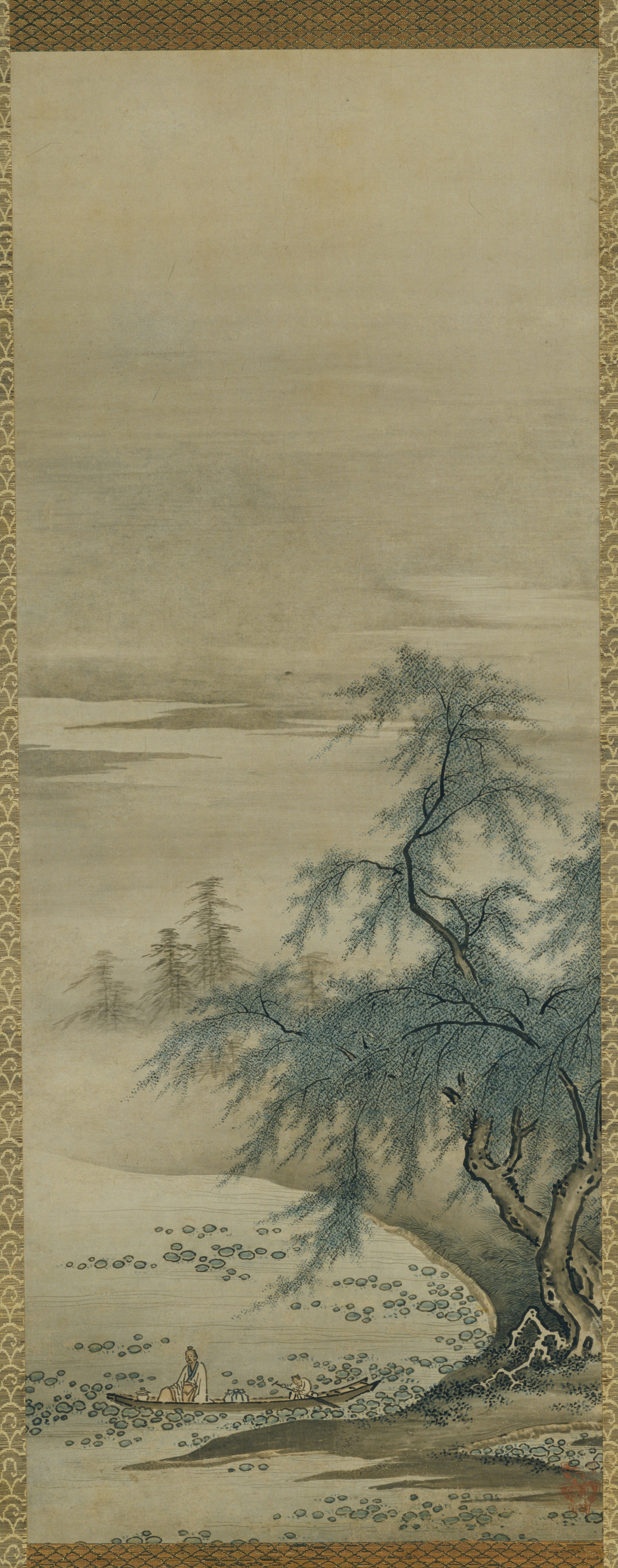
Kanō Masanobu, 15th century founder of the Kanō school, which dominated Japanese brush painting until the 19th century, Zhou Maoshu Appreciating Lotuses, hanging scroll

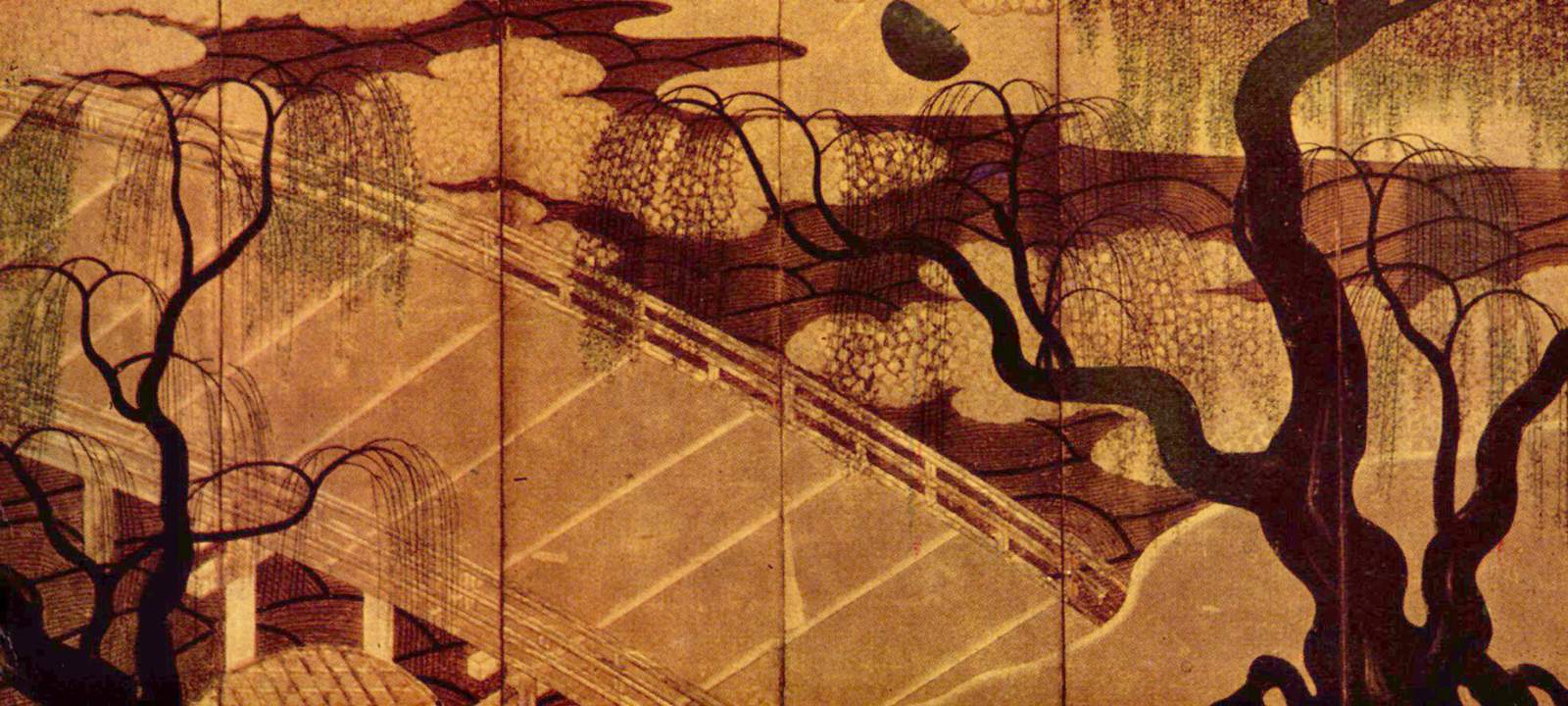
The Bridge at Ubi a famous screen composition, found in many 16th or 17th century versions, showing the colourful abstracted style of the professional painters. Yamato-e style of Japanese painting.

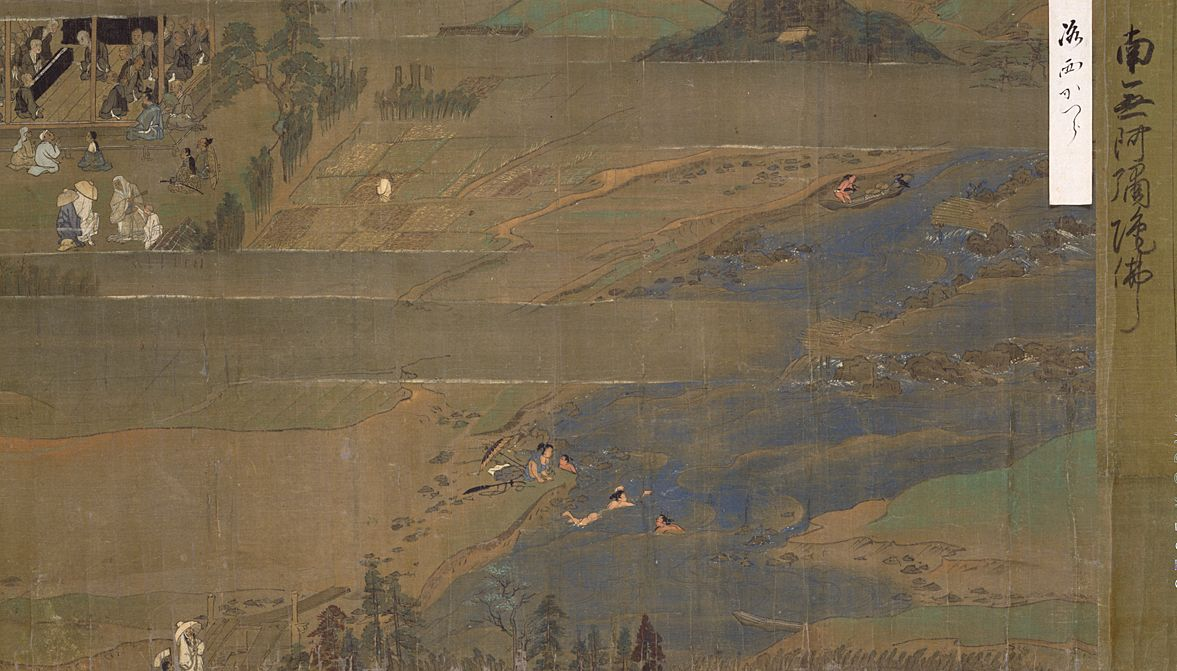
A scene from the Biography of the Priest Ippen yamato-e scroll, 1299

=== Persia and India ===
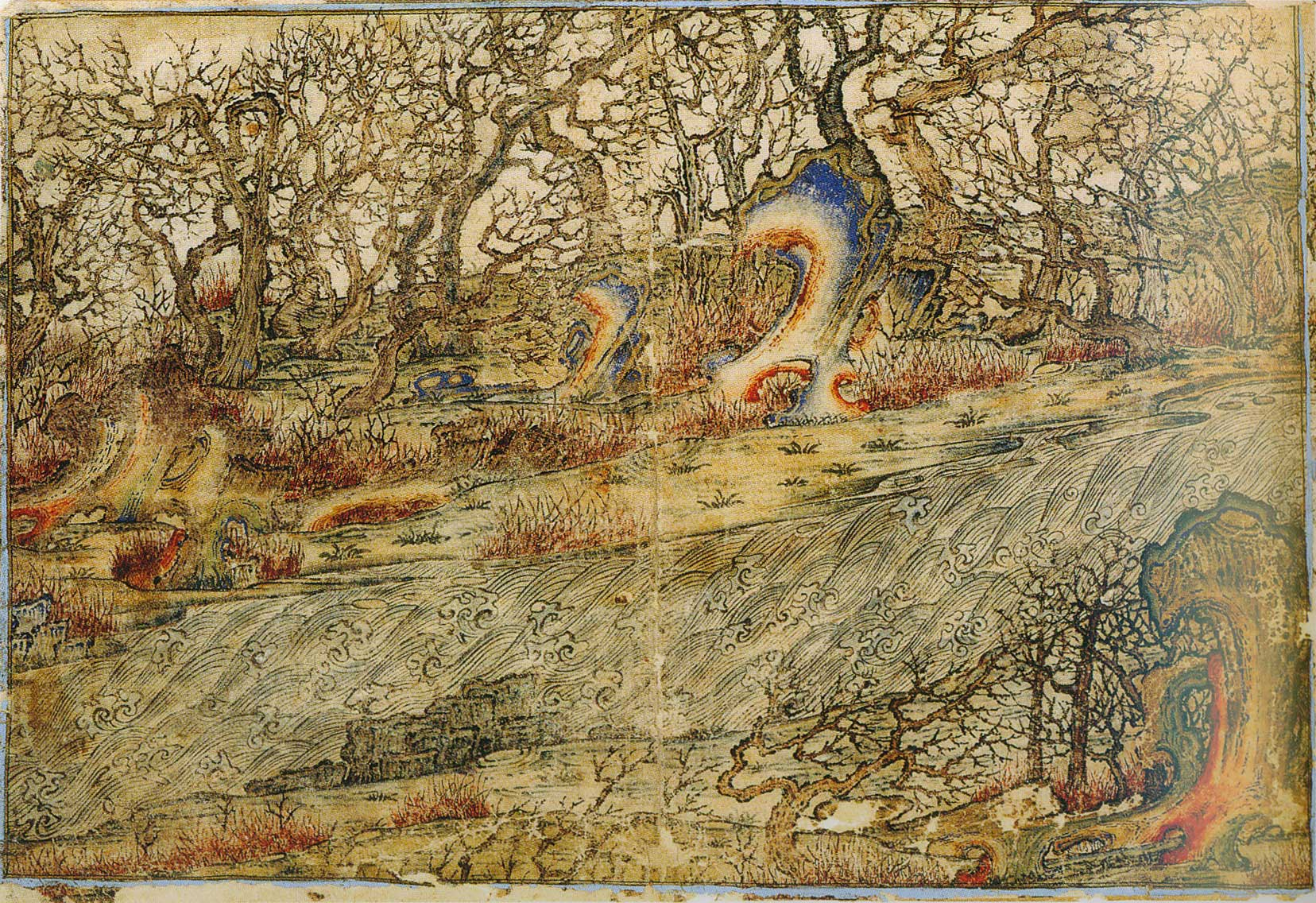
A rare pure landscape in a Persian miniature, with a river, Tabriz (?), 1st quarter of 14th century

Though there are some landscape elements in earlier art, the landscape tradition of the Persian miniature really begins in the Ilkhanid period, largely under Chinese influence. Rocky mountainous country is preferred, which is shown full of animals and plants which are carefully and individually depicted, as are rock formations. The particular convention of the elevated viewpoint that developed in the tradition fills most of the vertical format picture spaces with the landscape, though clouds are also typically shown in the sky, shown in a curling convention drawn from Chinese art. Usually, everything seen is fairly close to the viewer, and there are few distant views. Normally all landscape images show narrative scenes with figures, but there are a few drawn pure landscape scenes in albums.

Hindu painting had long set scenes amid lush vegetation, as many of the stories depicted demanded. Mughal painting combined this and the Persian style, and in miniatures of royal hunts often depicted wide landscapes. Scenes set during the monsoon rains, with dark clouds and flashes of lightning, are popular. Later, influence from European prints is evident.

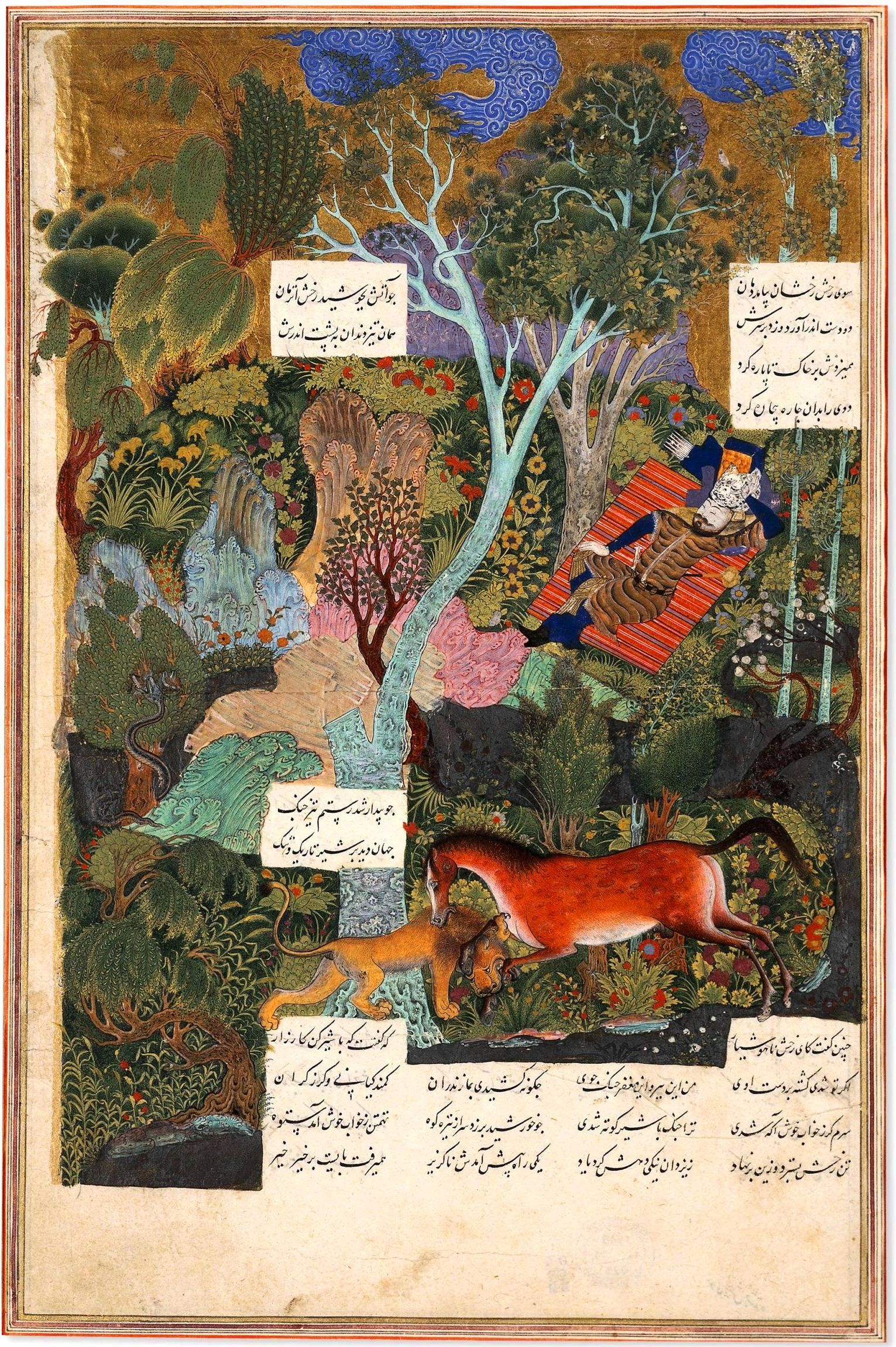
The Persian hero Rustam sleeps, while his horse Rakhsh fends off a lion. Probably an early work by Sultan Mohammed, 1515–20

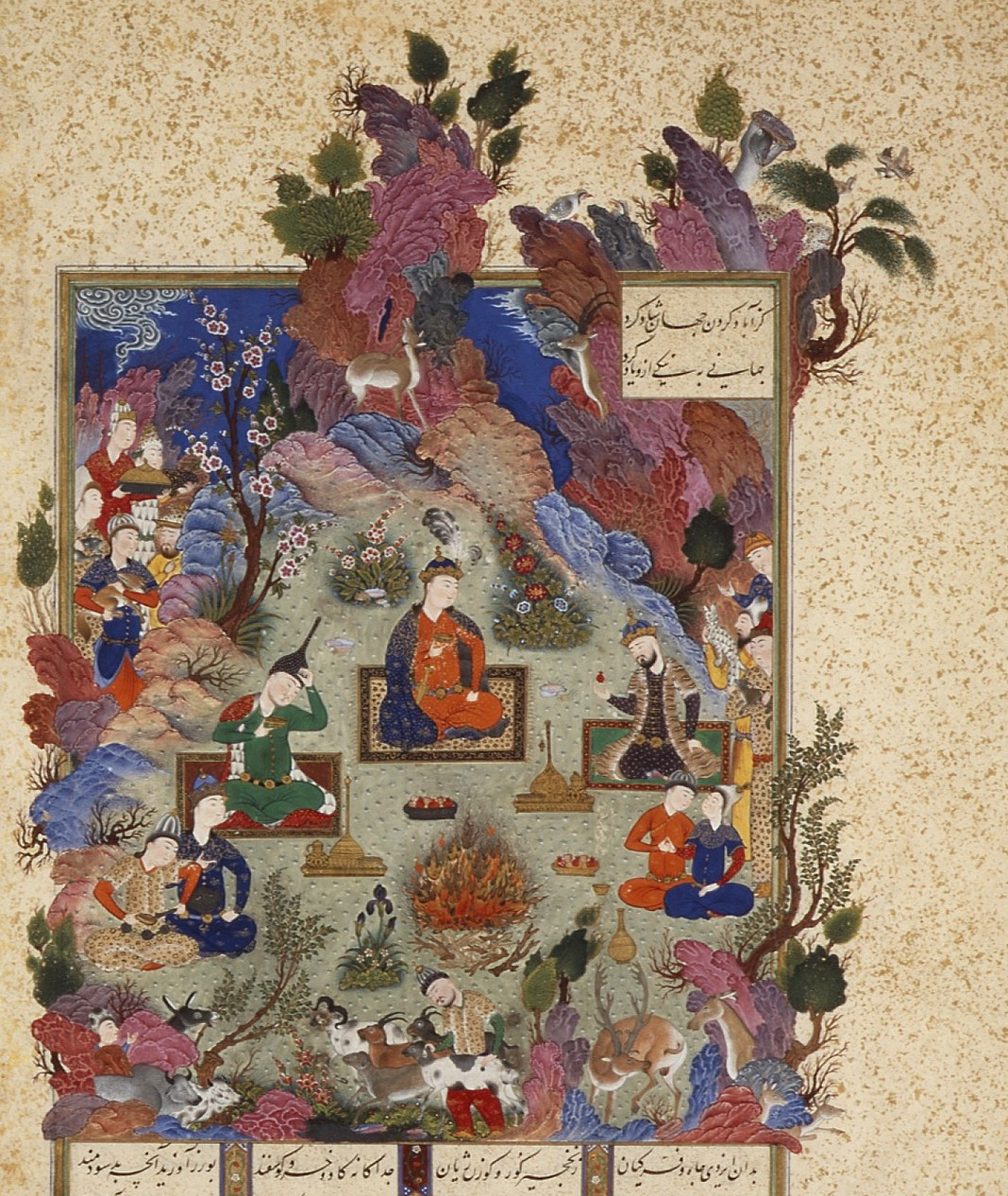
The Feast of Sada, Folio 22v from the Shahnama of Shah Tahmasp, Sultan Mohammed, c. 1525

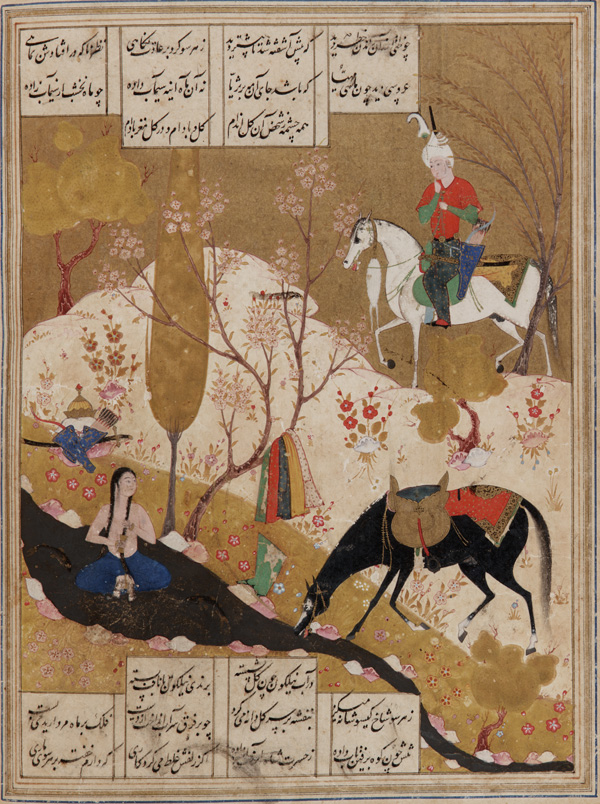
Khusraw discovers Shirin bathing in a pool, a favourite scene, here from 1548. The black stream is silver that has oxidized.

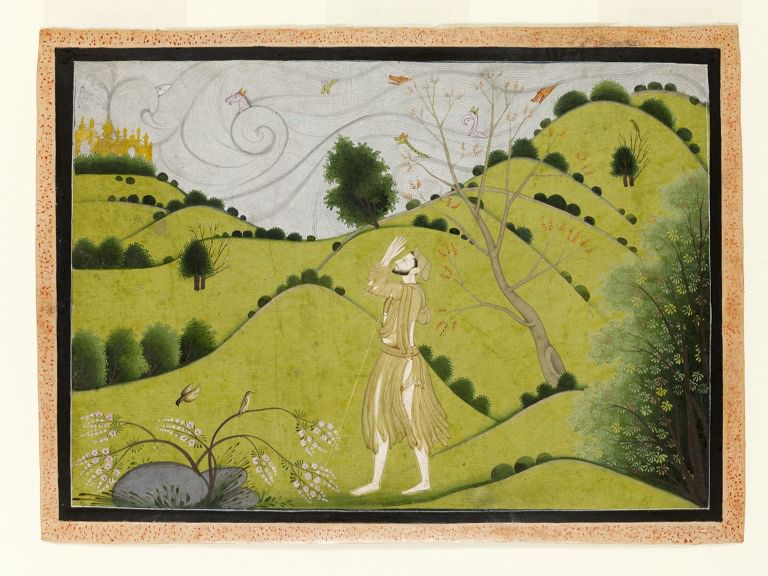
Sudama bows at the glimpse of Krishna's golden palace in Dwarka. ca 1775-1790 Pahari painting.

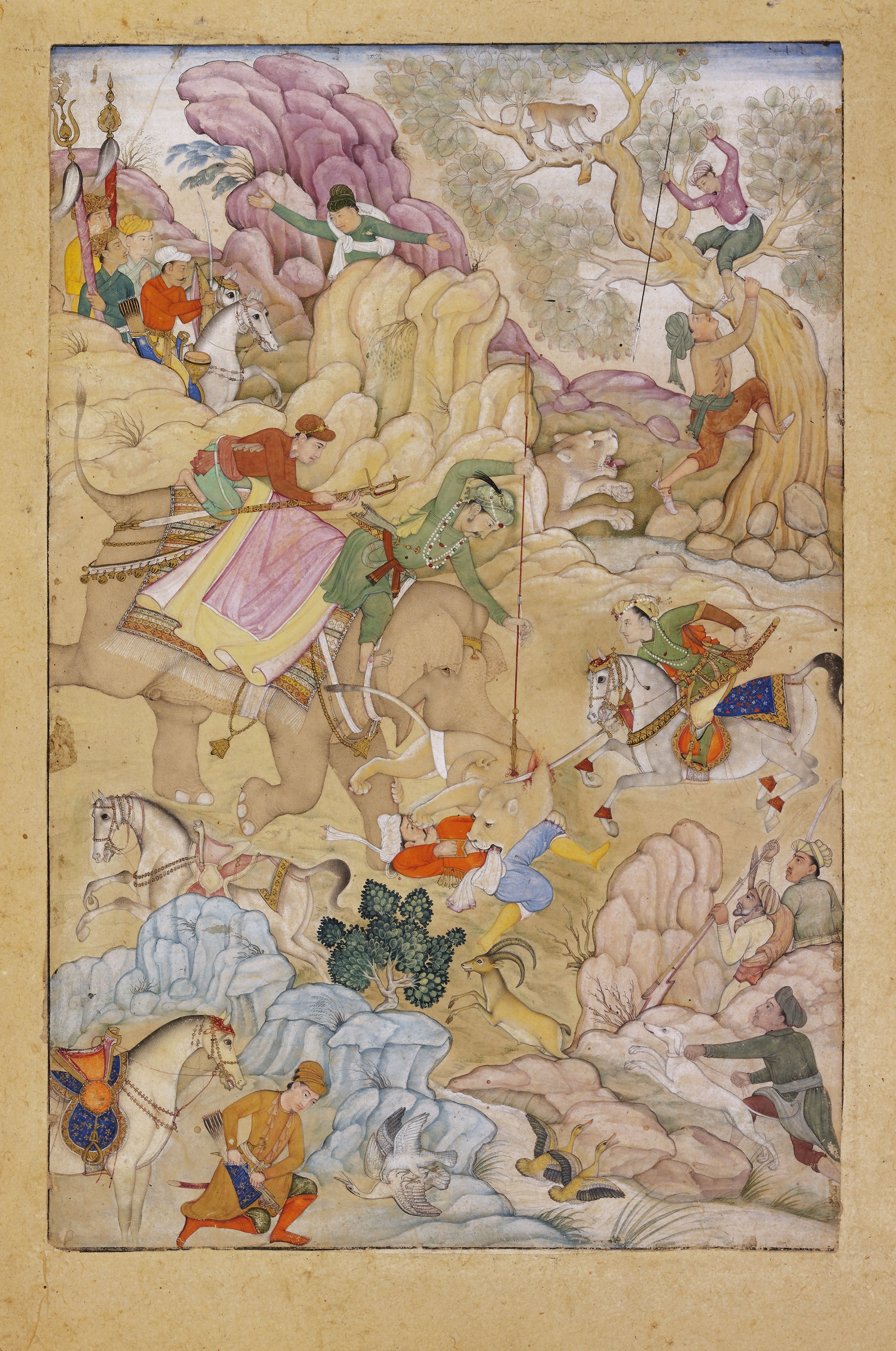
The Mughal emperor Jahangir's Lion Hunt, c. 1615, in a Persian-style landscape

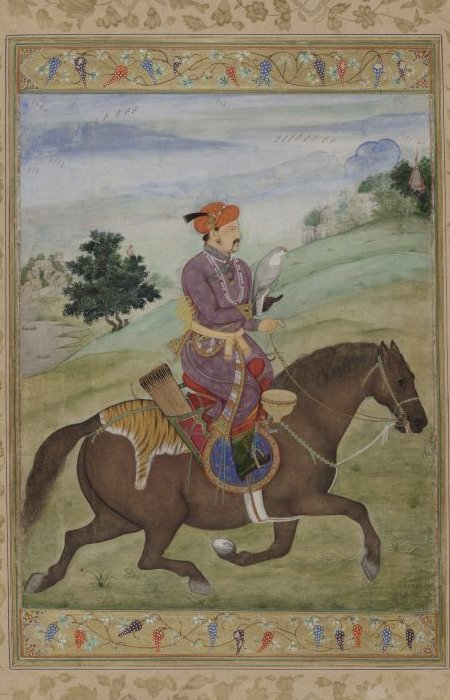
Jahangir hunting with a falcon, in Western-style country.

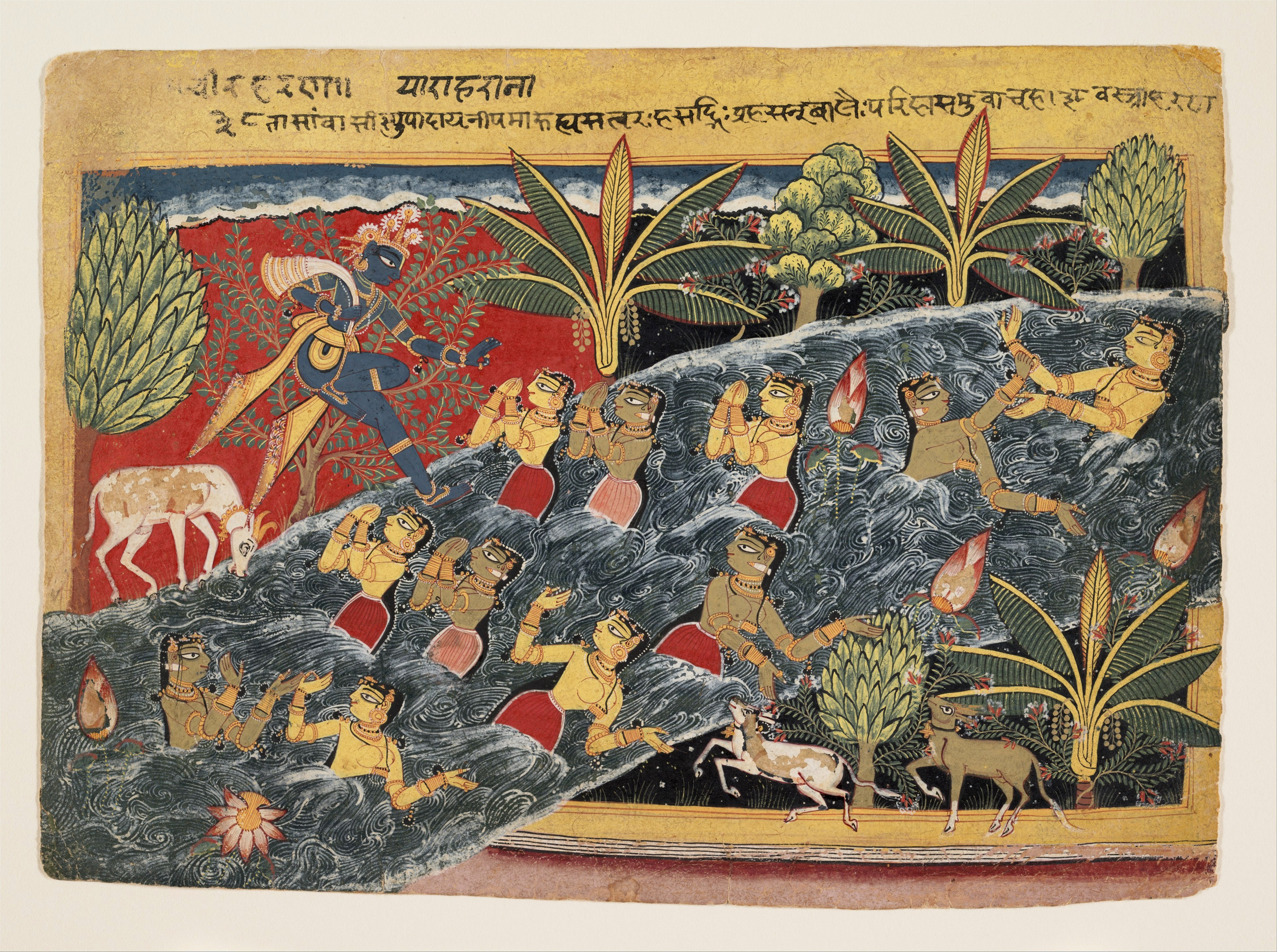
The Gopis Plead with Krishna to Return Their Clothing, 1560s

== Techniques ==
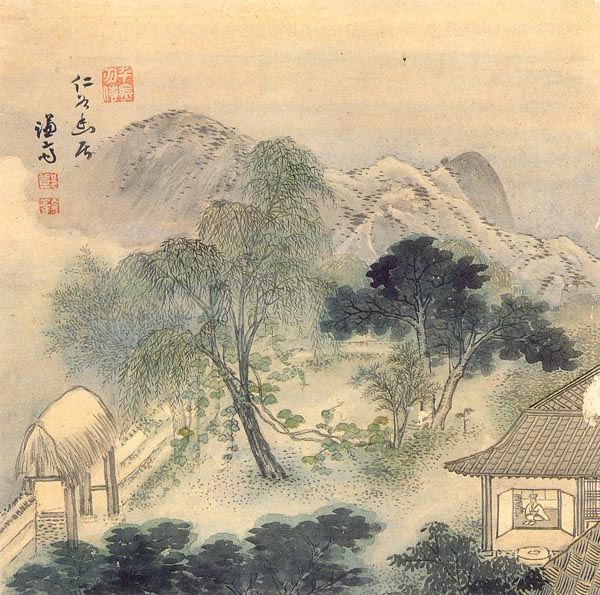
An 18th-century Korean version of the Chinese literati style by Jeong Seon who was unusual in often painting landscapes from life.

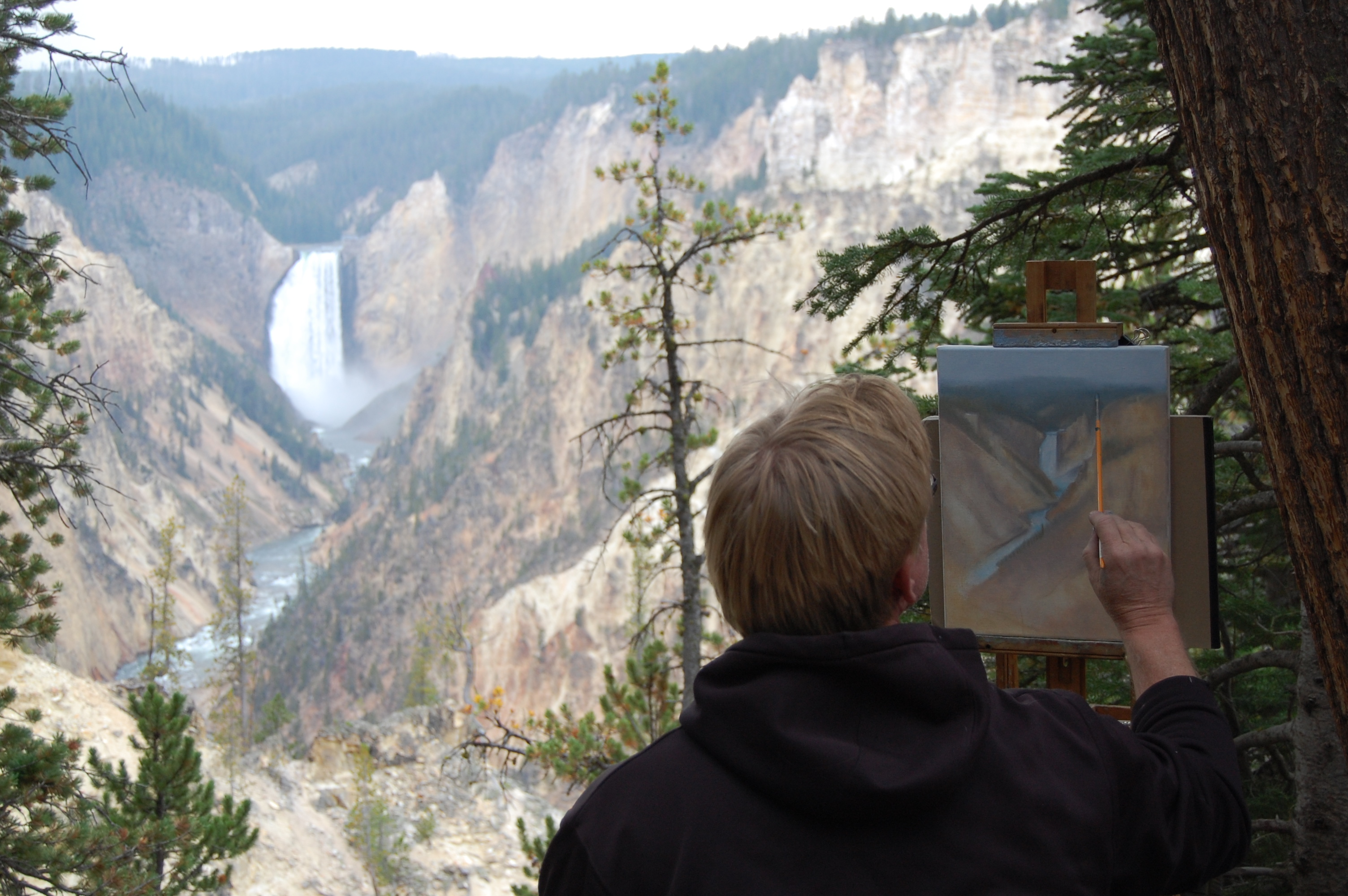
A landscape painter at Artist Point in Yellowstone National Park

Most early landscapes are clearly imaginary, although from very early on townscape views are clearly intended to represent actual cities, with varying degrees of accuracy. Various techniques were used to simulate the randomness of natural forms in invented compositions: the medieval advice of Cennino Cennini to copy ragged crags from small rough rocks was apparently followed by both Poussin and Thomas Gainsborough, while Degas copied cloud forms from a crumpled handkerchief held up against the light. The system of Alexander Cozens used random ink blots to give the basic shape of an invented landscape, to be elaborated by the artist.

The distinctive background view across Lake Geneva to the Le Môle peak in The Miraculous Draught of Fishes by Konrad Witz (1444) is often cited as the first Western rural landscape to show a specific scene. The landscape studies by Dürer clearly represent actual scenes, which can be identified in many cases, and were at least partly made on the spot; the drawings by Fra Bartolomeo also seem clearly sketched from nature. Dürer's finished works seem generally to use invented landscapes, although the spectacular bird's-eye view in his engraving Nemesis shows an actual view in the Alps, with additional elements. Several landscapists are known to have made drawings and watercolour sketches from nature, but the evidence for early oil painting being done outside is limited. The Pre-Raphaelite Brotherhood made special efforts in this direction, but it was not until the introduction of ready-mixed oil paints in tubes in the 1870s, followed by the portable "box easel", that painting en plein air became widely practiced.

A curtain of mountains at the back of the landscape is standard in wide Roman views and even more so in Chinese landscapes. Relatively little space is given to the sky in early works in either tradition; the Chinese often used mist or clouds between mountains, and also sometimes show clouds in the sky far earlier than Western artists, who initially mainly use clouds as supports or covers for divine figures or heaven. Both panel paintings and miniatures in manuscripts usually had a patterned or gold "sky" or background above the horizon until about 1400, but frescos by Giotto and other Italian artists had long shown plain blue skies. The single surviving altarpiece from Melchior Broederlam, completed for Champmol in 1399, has a gold sky populated not only by God and angels, but also a flying bird. A coastal scene in the Turin-Milan Hours has a sky overcast with carefully observed clouds. In woodcuts a large blank space can cause the paper to sag during printing, so Dürer and other artists often include clouds or squiggles representing birds to avoid this.

The monochrome Chinese tradition has used ink on silk or paper since its inception, with a great emphasis on the individual brushstroke to define the ts'un or "wrinkles" in mountain-sides, and the other features of the landscape. Western watercolour is a more tonal medium, even with underdrawing visible.

== Related -scapes ==
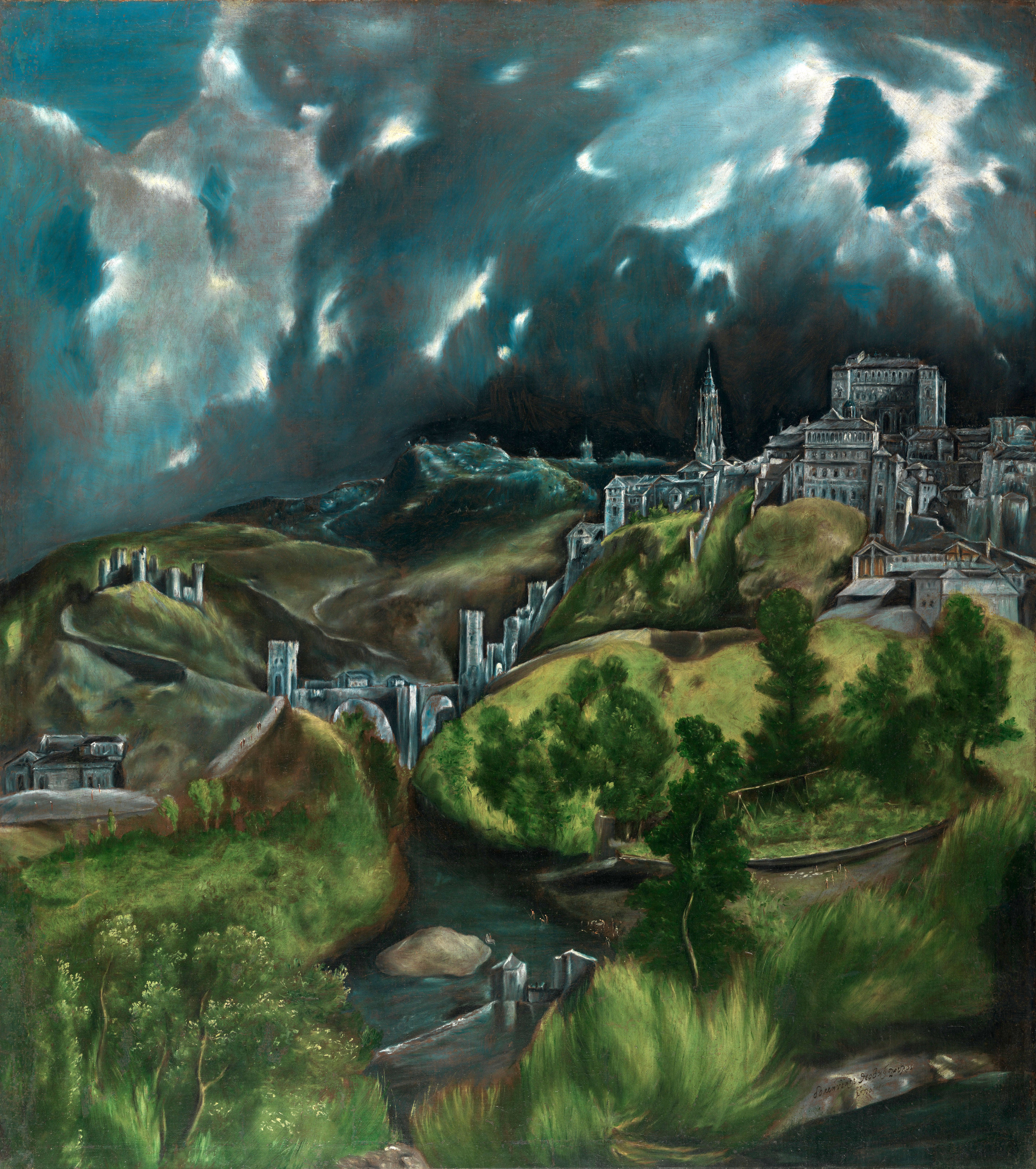
El Greco, View of Toledo, c. 1596–1600, oil on canvas, 47.75 × 42.75 cm, Metropolitan Museum of Art, New York City, is one of the two surviving landscapes of Toledo painted by him. The aggressive paint handling in the sky prefigures 20th century Expressionism.

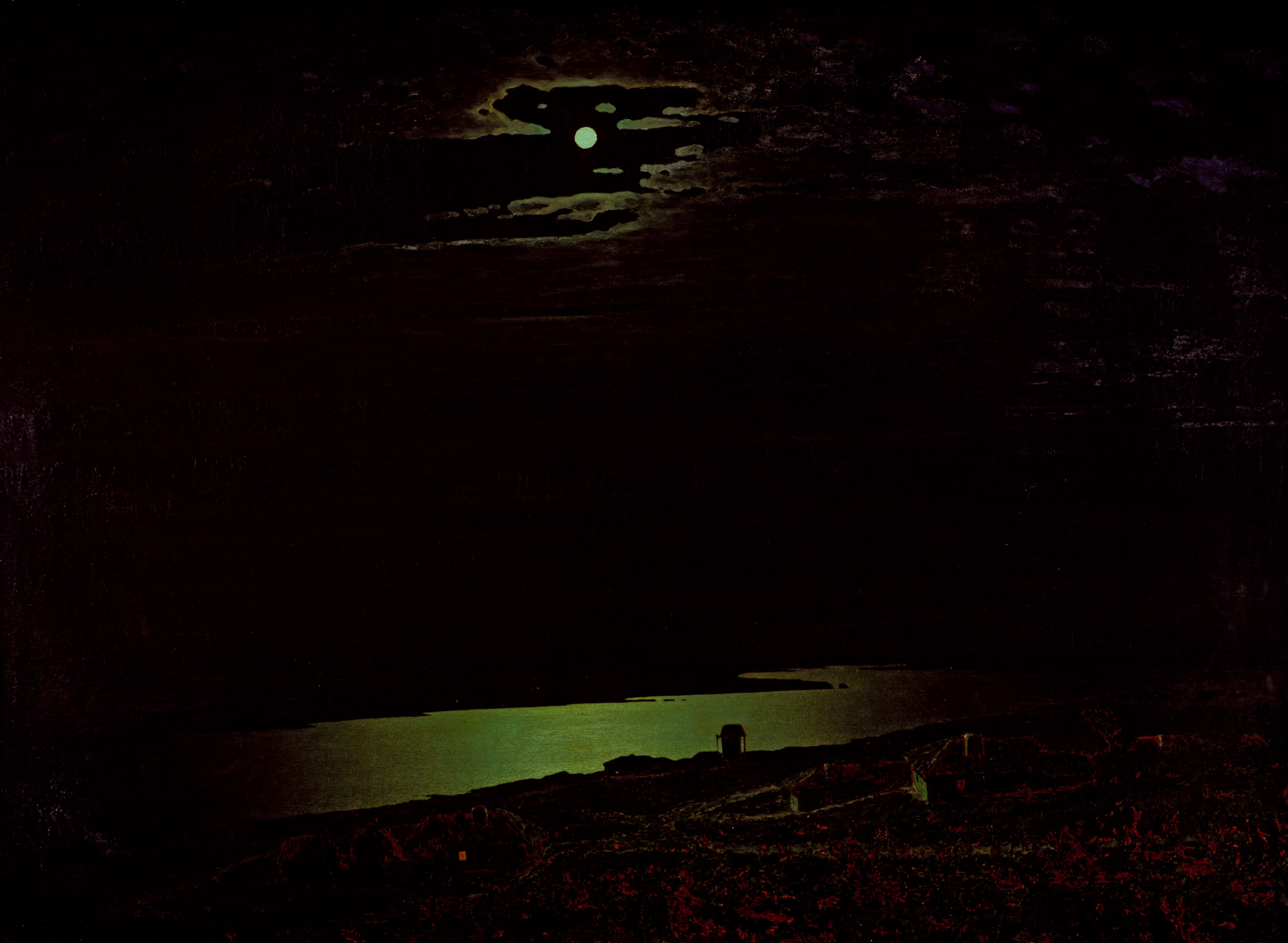
Arkhip Kuindzhi, Moonlit Night on the Dnieper, 1882

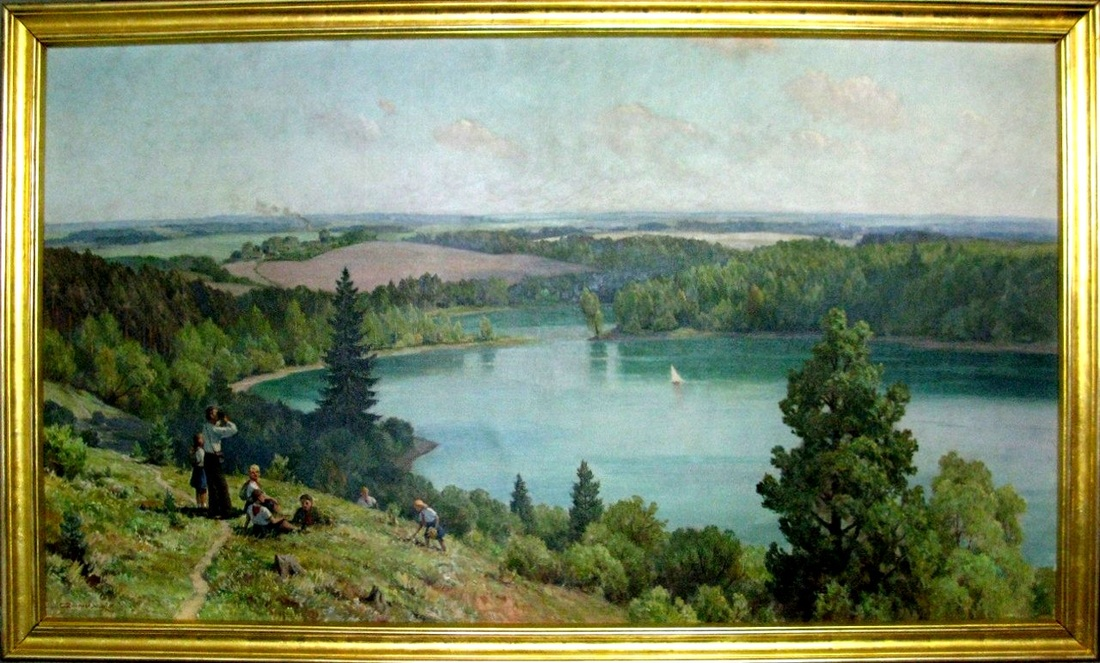
Czeslaw Znamierowski, The Green Lakes, 1955, USSR (Lithuania), Socialist realism.

Traditionally, landscape art depicts the surface of the Earth, but there are other sorts of landscapes, such as moonscapes.

- Skyscapes and cloudscapes depict clouds, weatherforms, and atmospheric conditions.
- Moonscapes show the landscape of a moon.
- Seascapes depict oceans or beaches.
- Riverscapes depict rivers or creeks.
- Cityscapes or townscapes depict cities (urban landscapes).
- Battle scenes are a subdivision of military painting which, when depicting a battle from afar, are set within a landscape, seascape, or even a cityscape.
- Hardscapes are paved areas like streets and sidewalks, housing developments, large business complexes, and industrial areas.
- Aerial landscapes depict a surface or ground from above, especially as seen from an airplane or spacecraft. (When the viewpoint is directly overhead, looking down, there is of course no depiction of a horizon or sky.) This genre can be combined with others, as in the aerial cloudscapes of Georgia O'Keeffe, the aerial moonscapes of Nancy Graves, or the aerial cityscapes of Yvonne Jacquette.
- Inscapes are landscape-like (usually surrealist or abstract) artworks which seek to convey the psychoanalytic view of the mind as a three-dimensional space. [For sources on this statement, see Inscape (visual art).]
- Veduta (Italian for view) is generally a painting of a landscape, often a cityscape, which were a common 18th-century painting theme.
- Hellscapes depict conceptions of hell, or places that resemble conceptions of hell.

=== Landscape and modernism ===
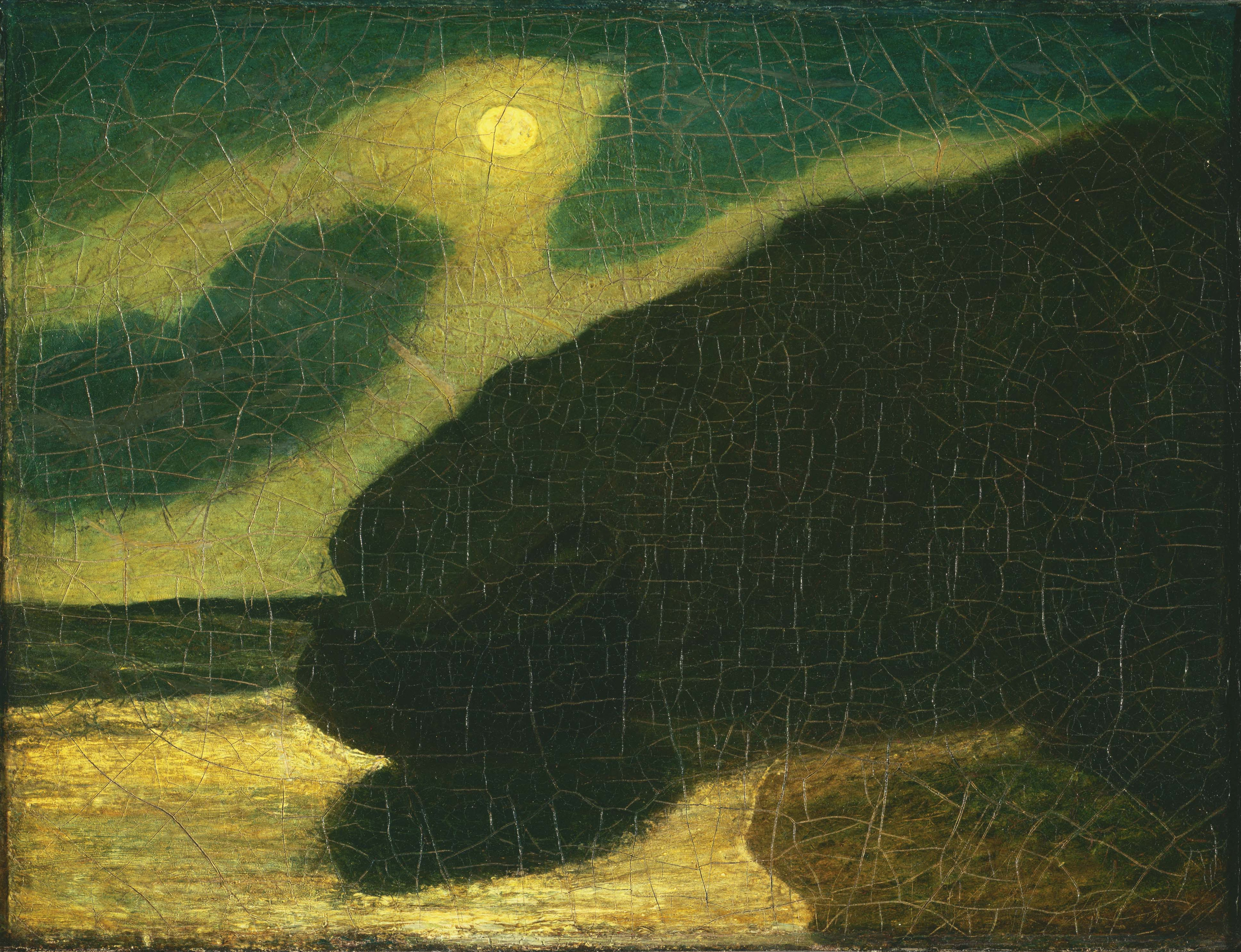
Albert Pinkham Ryder, Seacoast in Moonlight, 1890, the Phillips Collection, Washington, D.C. Proto-American Modernist associated with Tonalism.

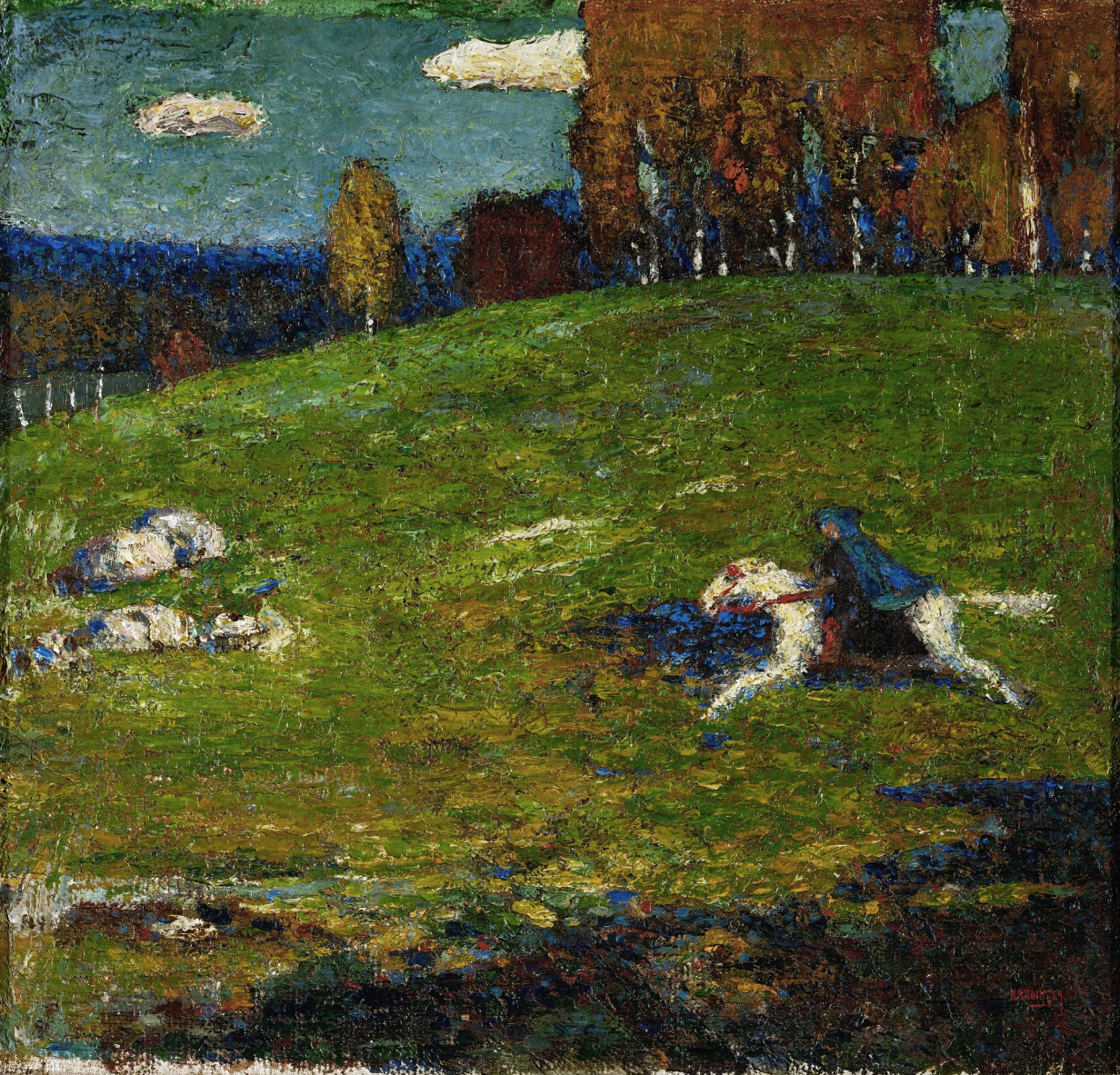
Wassily Kandinsky, Der Blaue Reiter, 1903. Der Blaue Reiter, an Expressionist group active from 1911 to 1914.

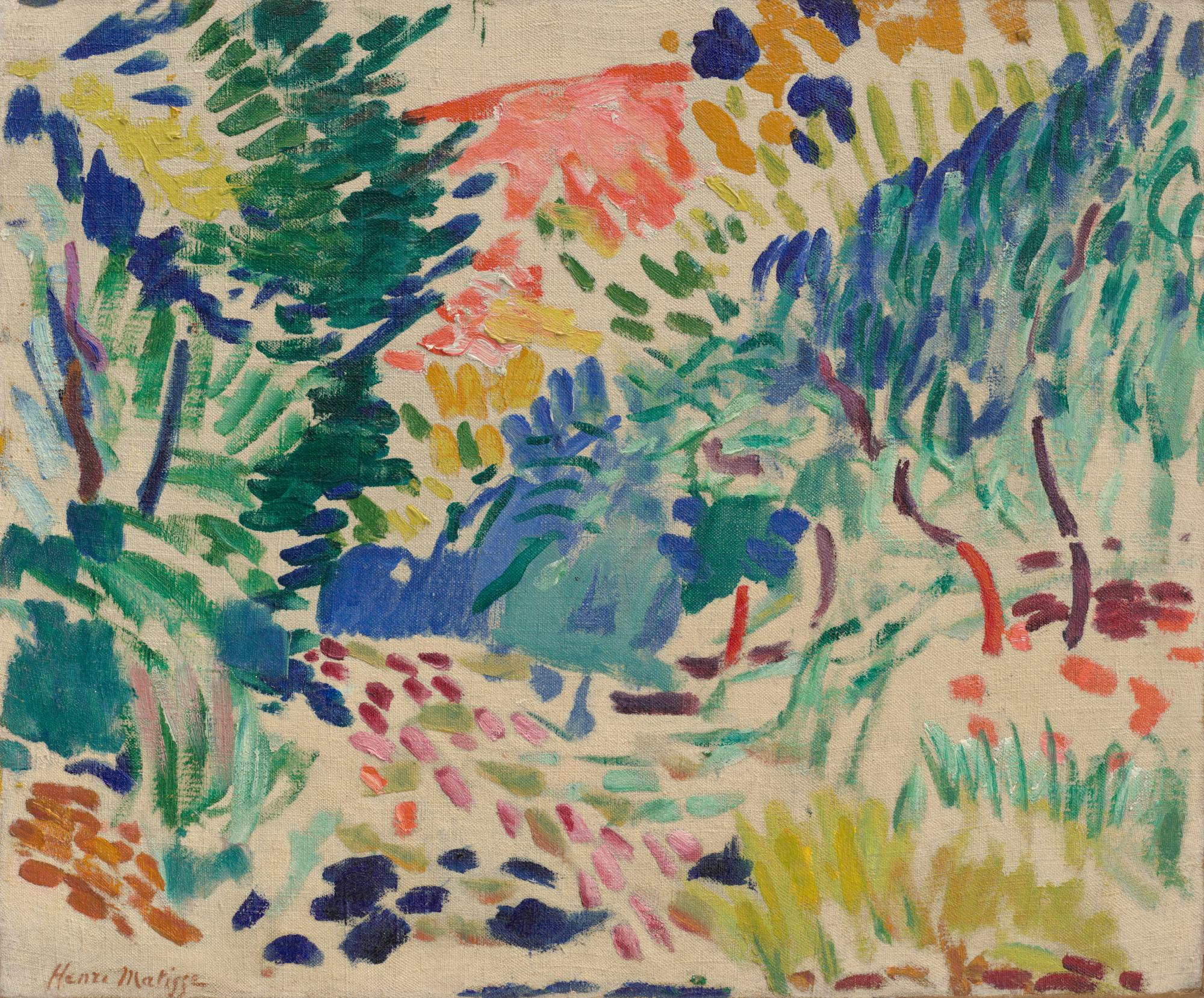
Henri Matisse, Landscape at Collioure, 1905, Museum of Modern Art, New York City. Fauvism a Modernist movement in Paris active from 1900 to 1907.

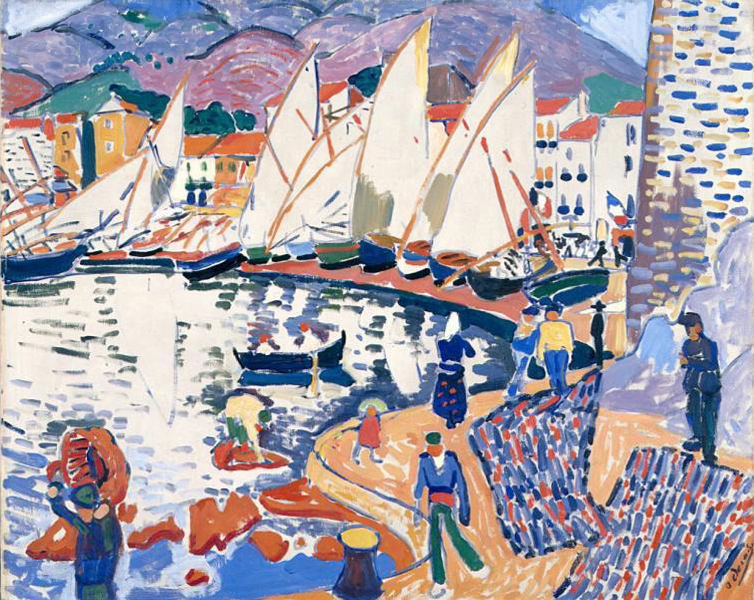
André Derain, 1905, Le séchage des voiles (The Drying Sails), oil on canvas, 82 × 101 cm, Pushkin Museum, Moscow. Exhibited at the 1905 Salon d'Automne

Jean Metzinger, 1906, Coucher de soleil no. 1 (Landscape), oil on canvas, 72.5 × 100 cm, Rijksmuseum Kröller-Müller, Otterlo, Netherlands

Pablo Picasso, 1908, Paysage aux deux figures (Landscape with Two Figures), oil on canvas, 60 x 73 cm, Musée Picasso, Paris

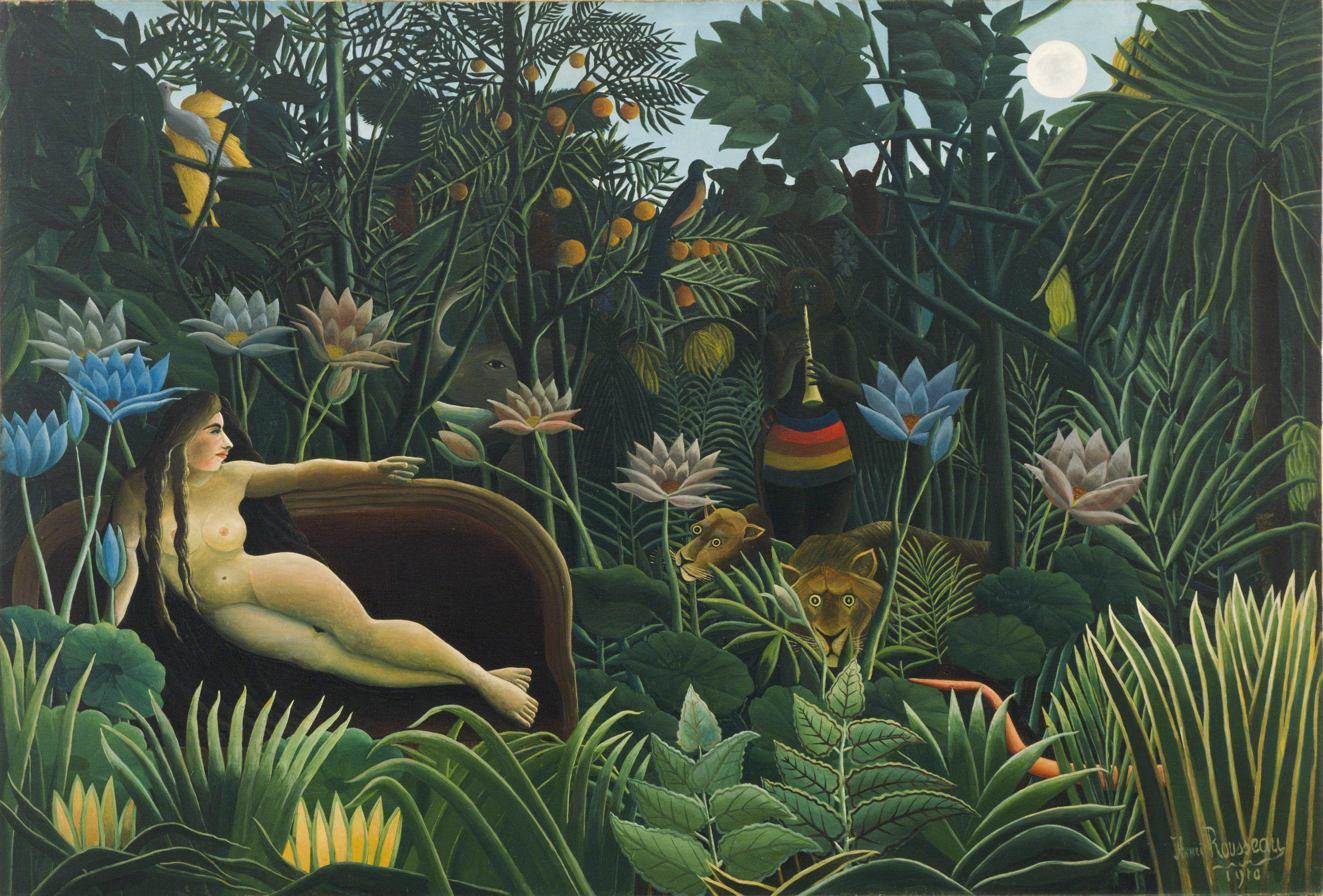
Henri Rousseau, The Dream, 1910, Museum of Modern Art, New York City

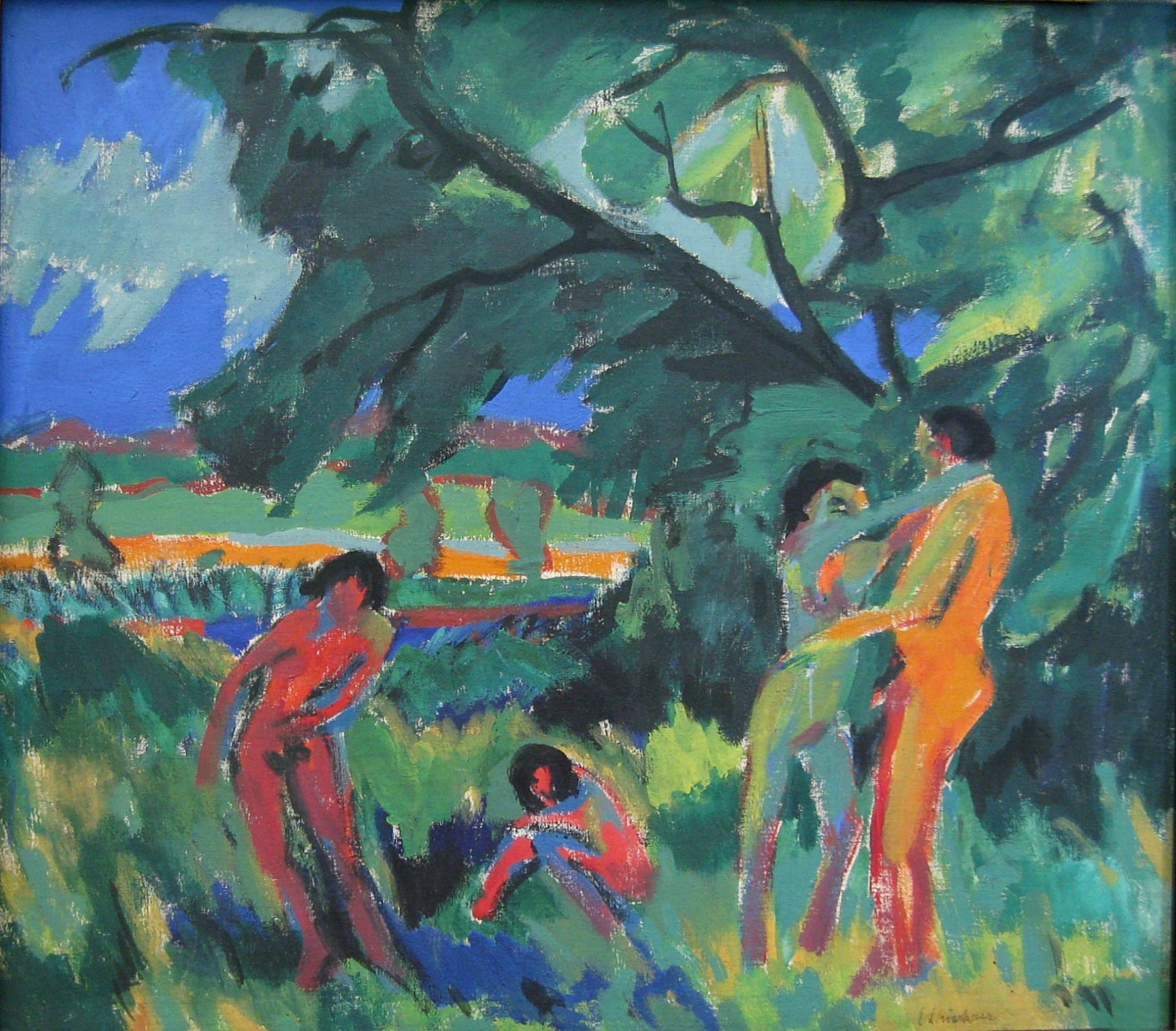
Ernst Ludwig Kirchner, Naked Playing People, 1910. Die Brücke, an Expressionist group active after 1905.

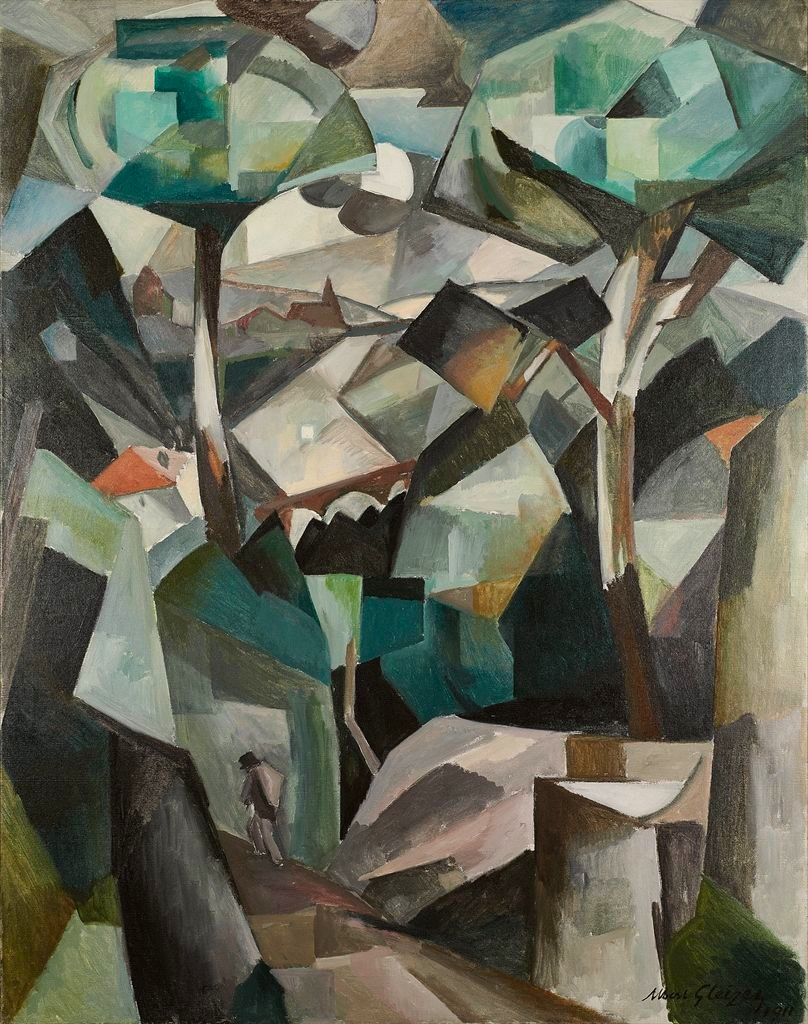
Albert Gleizes, 1911, Le Chemin, Paysage à Meudon, Paysage avec personnage, oil on canvas, 146.4 × 114.4 cm. Stolen by Nazi occupiers from the home of collector Alphonse Kann during World War II

== Landscape art movements ==
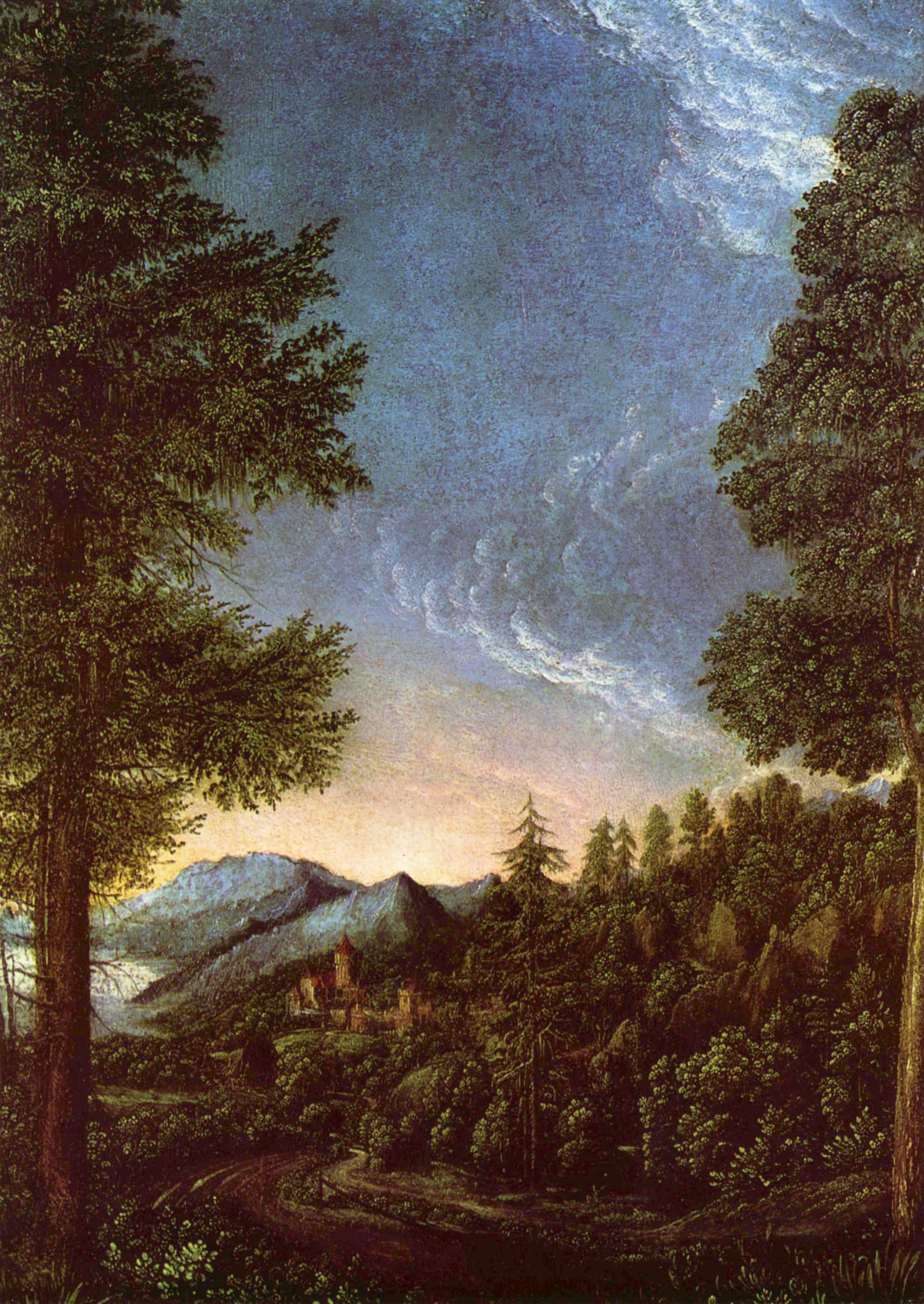
Albrecht Altdorfer (c. 1480–1538), Danube landscape near Regensburg c. 1528, one of the earliest Western pure landscapes. He was the leader of the Danube School in southern Germany.

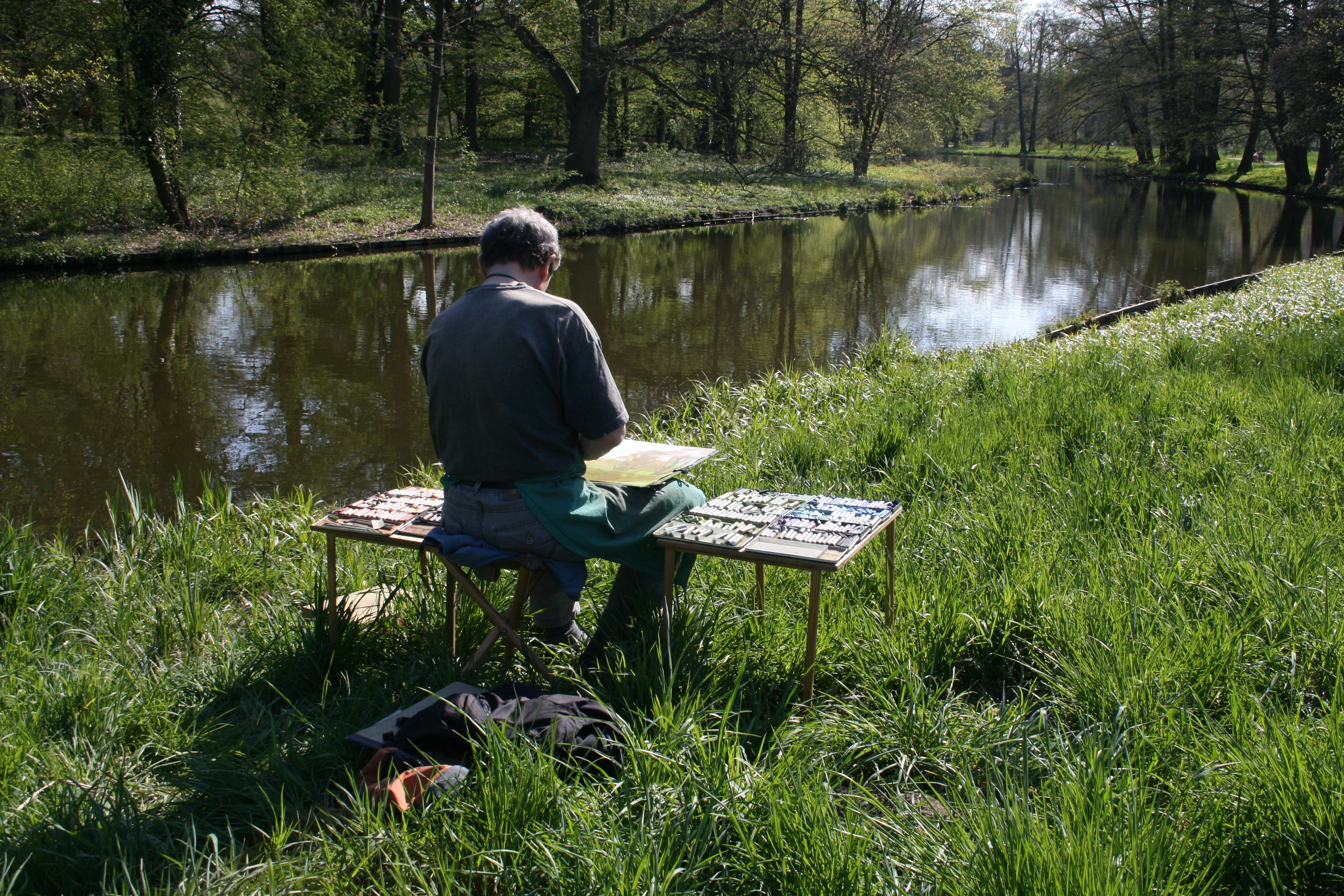
Pastel landscape painting en plein air

=== East Asian ===
China

- Southern School, 8th–16th centuries, also known as the literati school
- Four Masters of the Yuan Dynasty
- Four Masters of the Ming Dynasty
- Six Masters of the early Qing period, including the Four Wangs

Japan—often dynastic

- Tosa school 14th or 15th century to 19th
- Kanō school 15th to 19th centuries
- Hasegawa school mid-16th to early 18th century
- Nanga ("Southern painting"), professionals in the Edo period influenced by Chinese literati painting – 17th to 19th centuries

=== Middle Eastern ===
Palestinian landscape painting

=== Western ===
Pre–19th century

- Danube school

19th and 20th century

- American Barbizon school
- American Impressionism
- Amsterdam Impressionism
- Barbizon School
- Düsseldorf school of painting
- Etching revival
- Fauvism
- Group of Seven (Canada)
- Hague School
- Heidelberg School (Australia)
- Hoosier Group
- Hudson River School
- Impressionism
- Land art
- Luminism (American)
- Luminism (Impressionism)
- Macchiaioli
- Neo-Impressionism
- Norwich School
- Peredvizhniki
- Pont-Aven School
- Post-Impressionism
- Pre-Raphaelite Brotherhood
- The Ten
- Tonalism
- White Mountain art

== See also ==
- Claude glass
- Landscape architecture
- Landscape photography
- Vädersolstavlan ('The Sundog Painting')
- Visual arts
- Skyscraper
- Category:Landscape paintings
