= Stanisław Masłowski =

Polish artist (1853–1926)

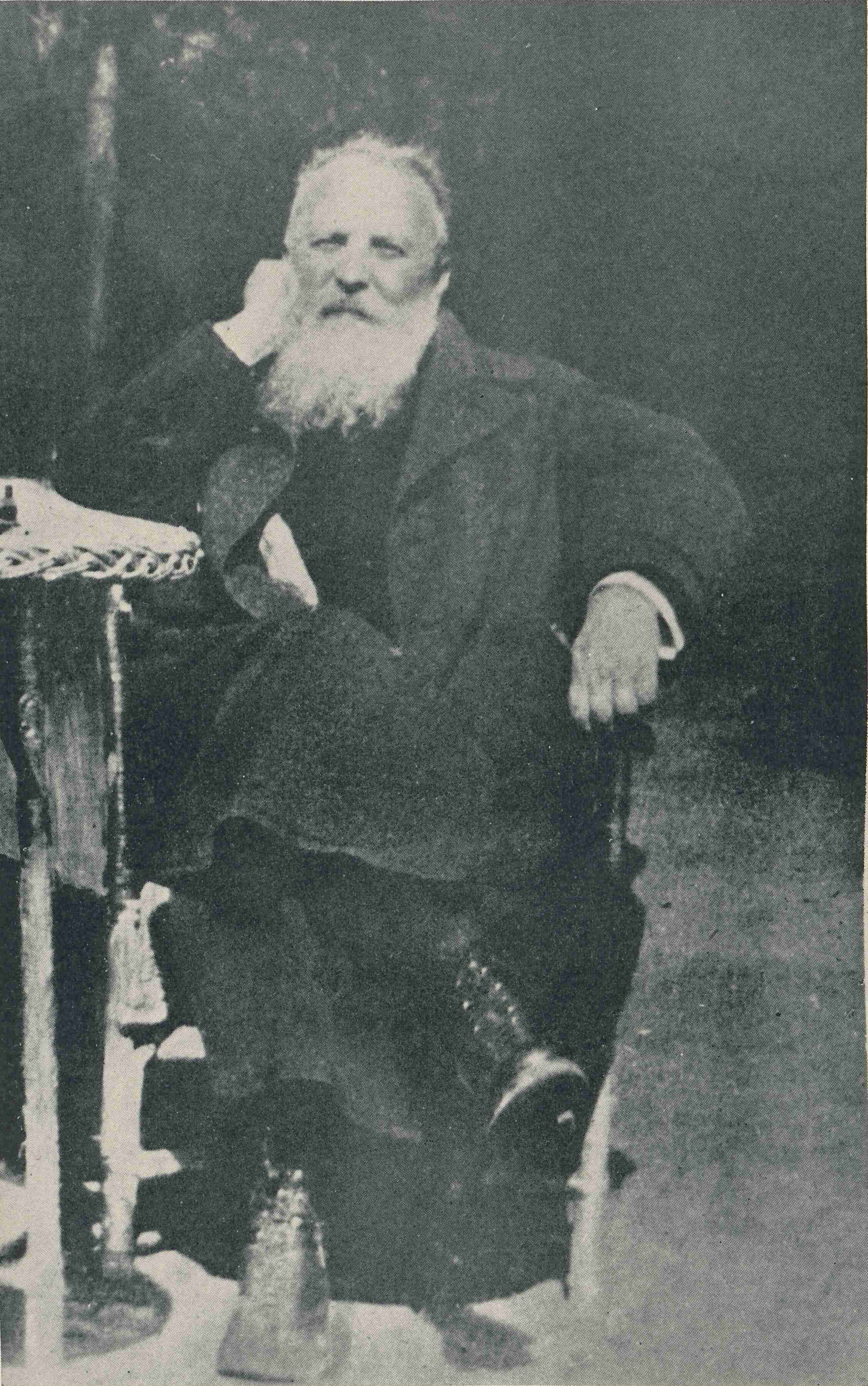
- Stanisław Masłowski in 1925
- Born: 3 December 1853; Włodawa, Congress Poland, Russian Empire
- Died: 31 May 1926 (aged 72); Warsaw, Poland
- Education: Academy of Fine Arts in Warsaw
- Known for: Painting
- Movement: Realism

Stanisław Masłowski (Polish: [staˈɲiswaf masˈwɔfskʲi]; born Stanisław Stefan Zygmunt Ludgard Masłowski; 3 December 1853 – 31 May 1926) was a Polish painter of realistic style, the author of watercolor landscapes.

== Life and career ==
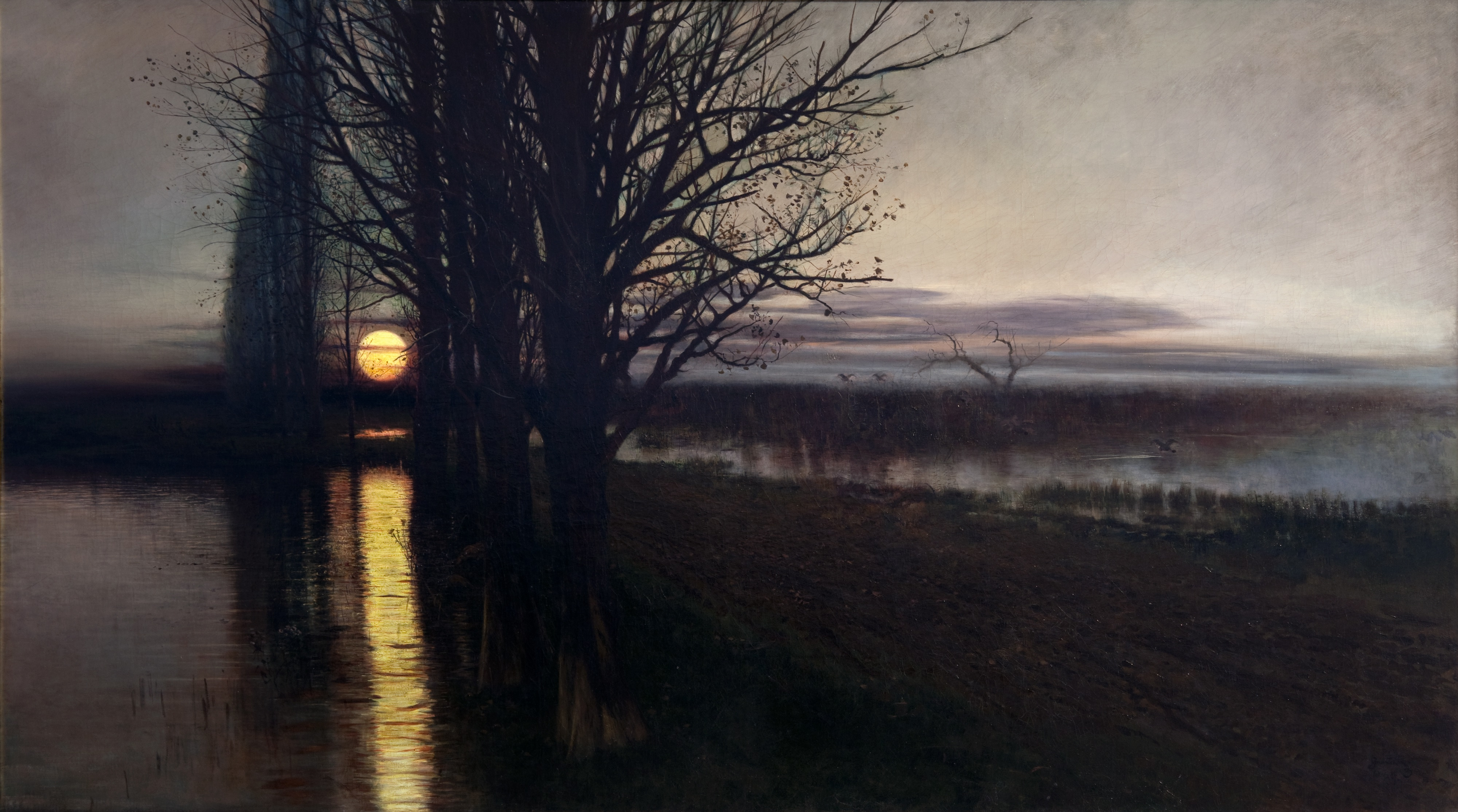
Moonrise, oil-on-canvas, 1884, Sukiennice Gallery, National Museum in Kraków

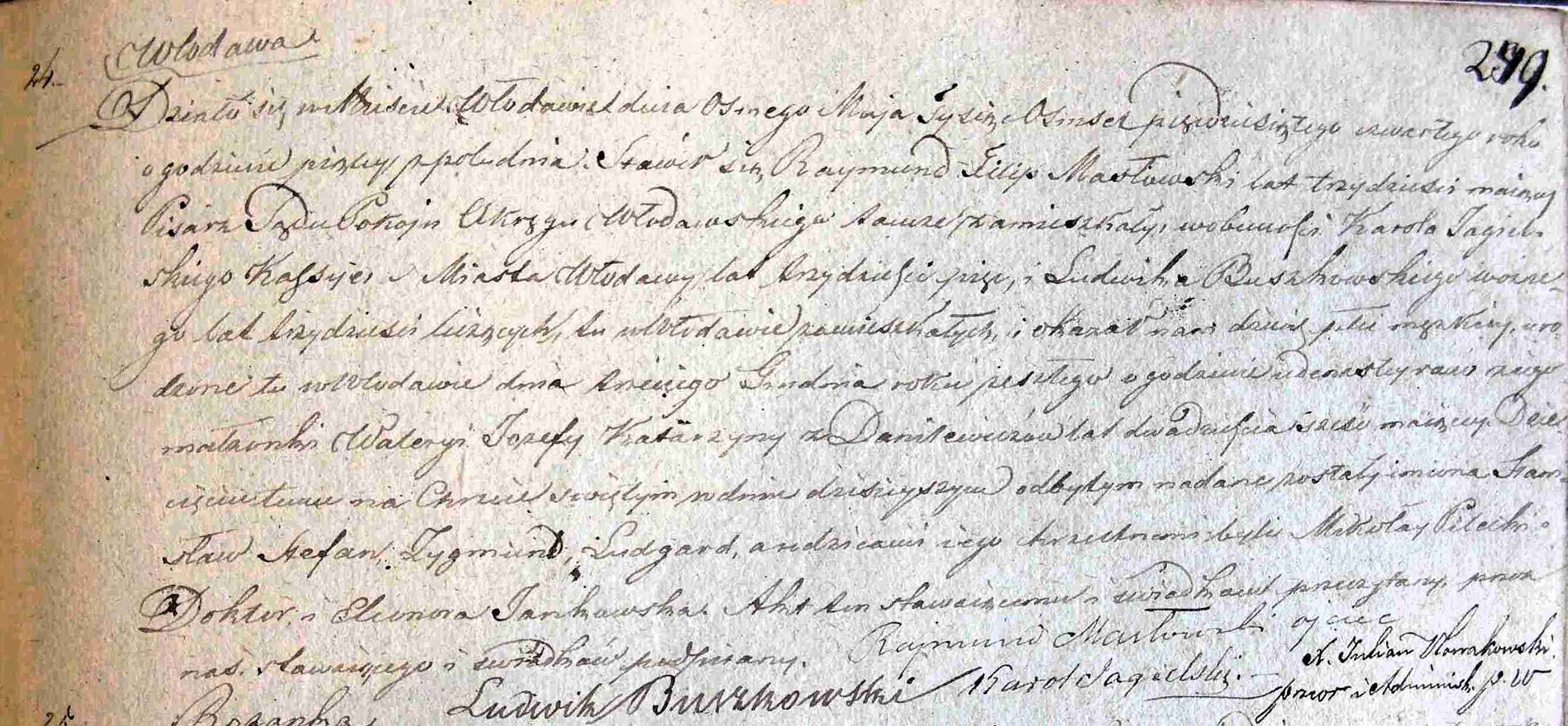
Stanisław Masłowski certificate of birth and baptism, 1854 (in Polish)

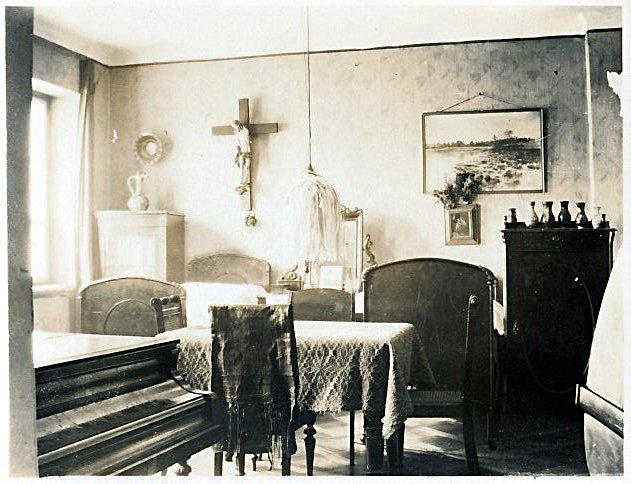
Masłowski's apartment, Warsaw, Poland, 60, Chmielna street, apt.7, fragment interely destroyed during the Warsaw Uprising at the end of 1944

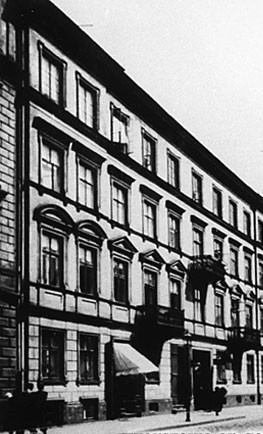
The Tenement, at Chmielna street in Warsaw, where the Masłowski family lived before 1945, completely destroyed during the Warsaw Uprising at the end of 1944

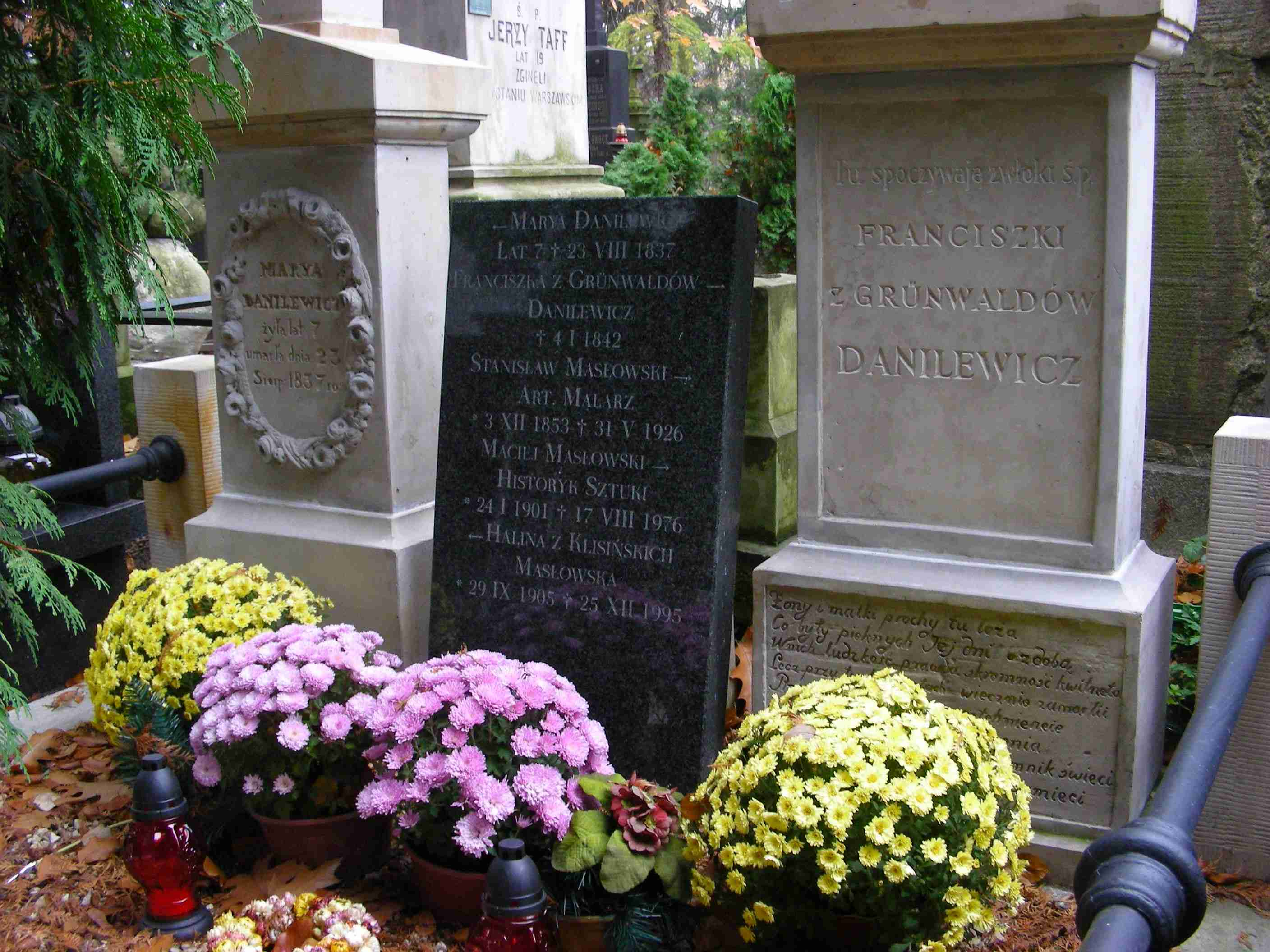
Stanisław Masłowski grave at Stare Powązki Cemetery in Warsaw, Poland, sect. 11-1-7/8, view of November 2012

Masłowski was born on 3 December 1853 in Włodawa (present day Poland), and there was christened 8 May 1854. His certificate of baptism is stored in the archives of the Parish of St. Louis of Pauline Fathers in Włodawa. He came from an impoverished noble family (Samson coat of arms), which originates from Wieluń (Poland) . "Masłowski" family used the nickname "Watta of Ruda" (Polish: "z Rudy"). Zygmunt Gloger in his Geografia historyczna ziem dawnej Polski (Historic Geography of Ancient Polish Lands) repeats after Jan Długosz, that the first capital of Wieluń County was Ruda before Wieluń, which was more conveniently located.

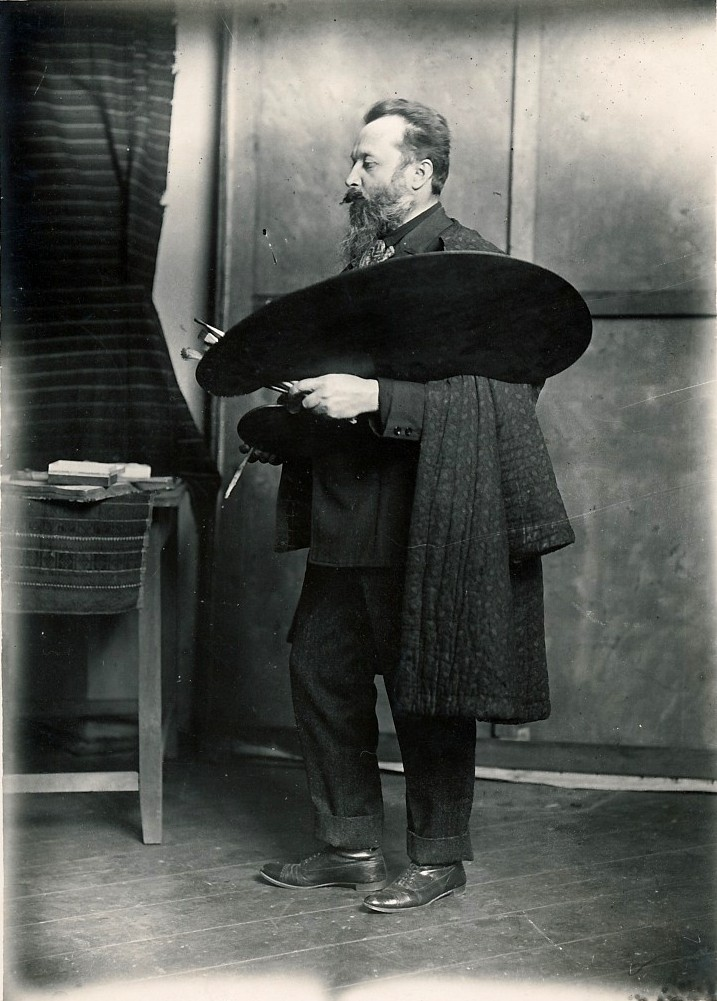
Stanisław Masłowski at his Warsaw studio, phot. c. 1905–1910

Masłowski was the son of Rajmund Masłowski (1825–1897) and Waleria Józefa Katarzyna née Danilewicz (1827–1881). One of his four brothers was Bolesław Masłowski, chemist (1851–1928). Masłowski's grandfather from his mother, Wincenty Danilewicz vel Danielewicz, (Ostoja coat of arms, born in 1787 in Mińsk Lit. – former Polish–Lithuanian Commonwealth territory), was involved – as light-cavalryman – in the Napoleonic campaign, for which he was awarded the French Order of Legion of Honour. Masłowski's father was a lawyer. He was promoted several times, changing with his family place of residence.

Włodawa, place of birth of the future artist – was one of many towns where his father was employed. Masłowski family moved in 1856 from Włodawa to Garwolin, where Rajmund served as a courtroom writer. In 1858–1865 Maslowski lived in Chęciny. It is worth noting that Rajmund Masłowski in January Uprising was the head of the Chęciny district. Therefore, in mid- 1864 he was arrested, and then about six months he spent in prison in Kielce

Since 1865 Masłowski lived in Kalisz, where his first drawing teacher in the local high school, was painter Stanisław Barcikowski, a graduate of Warsaw School of Fine Arts. During this period, Masłowski drew a lot from nature, including between 1865 and 1871 in Bronów near Poddębice at his father's friends – Maria and Jarosław Konopnicki (see story by Konopnicka: "How do Children in Bronów with Rozalia Entertained", where he was called "Stasikoszczok") and then in Jędrzejów, where lived Wincenty Danilewicz, his grandfather. He was also copying Juliusz Kossak's pictures from illustrated magazines.

=== Art studies ===
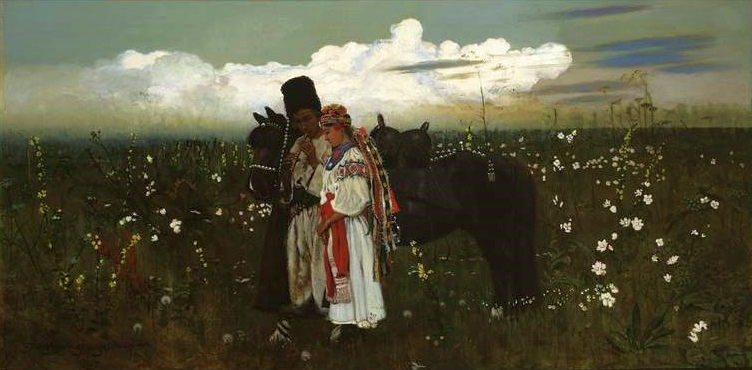
Duma Jaremy (Jarema's Duma), oil/canvas, 1879

Since 1871 Stanisław Masłowski lived in Warsaw, where his father was transferred by court administration. His studies at the Warsaw School of Drawing (i. e. Wojciech Gerson's drawing school) lasted perhaps permanently in 1871–1875. "In this school I received – finds the artist in an autobiographical note – the advice of Mr. Gerson and Mr. Aleksander Kamiński." In 1875 Masłowski received the silver medal of the Academy of Fine Arts in St. Petersburg, as an award for his school drawings. During this period he took an active part in the life of the famous atelier rented by a group of artists-painters: J. Chełmoński, S. Witkiewicz, A.Piotrowski and others in the "Hotel Europejski" in Warsaw. Sincere affection for his colleagues from "Europe" (as he called it) remained him for the rest of his life.

However, it was Ukraine, which gave to young Masłowski many painting emotions. For the first time he went there accompanied by writer Edward Chłopicki (1875). The second trip took place in 1876 (with this Ukrainian visit a number of Masłowski's letters to the artist-painter Władysław Leszczyński are involved). The next trips took place at least in 1878, and 1886.

In 1884–1887 Stanisław Masłowski entered a new phase of creativity and a new environment. At that time, he developed close relations with the group of friendly painters and writers associated with "Wędrowiec" weekly magazine, including Aleksander Gierymski and Antoni Sygietyński, and young painters: Józef Pankiewicz and Władysław Podkowiński. In 1886 Masłowski spent half a year in Munich, where – as he writes – "worked at home".

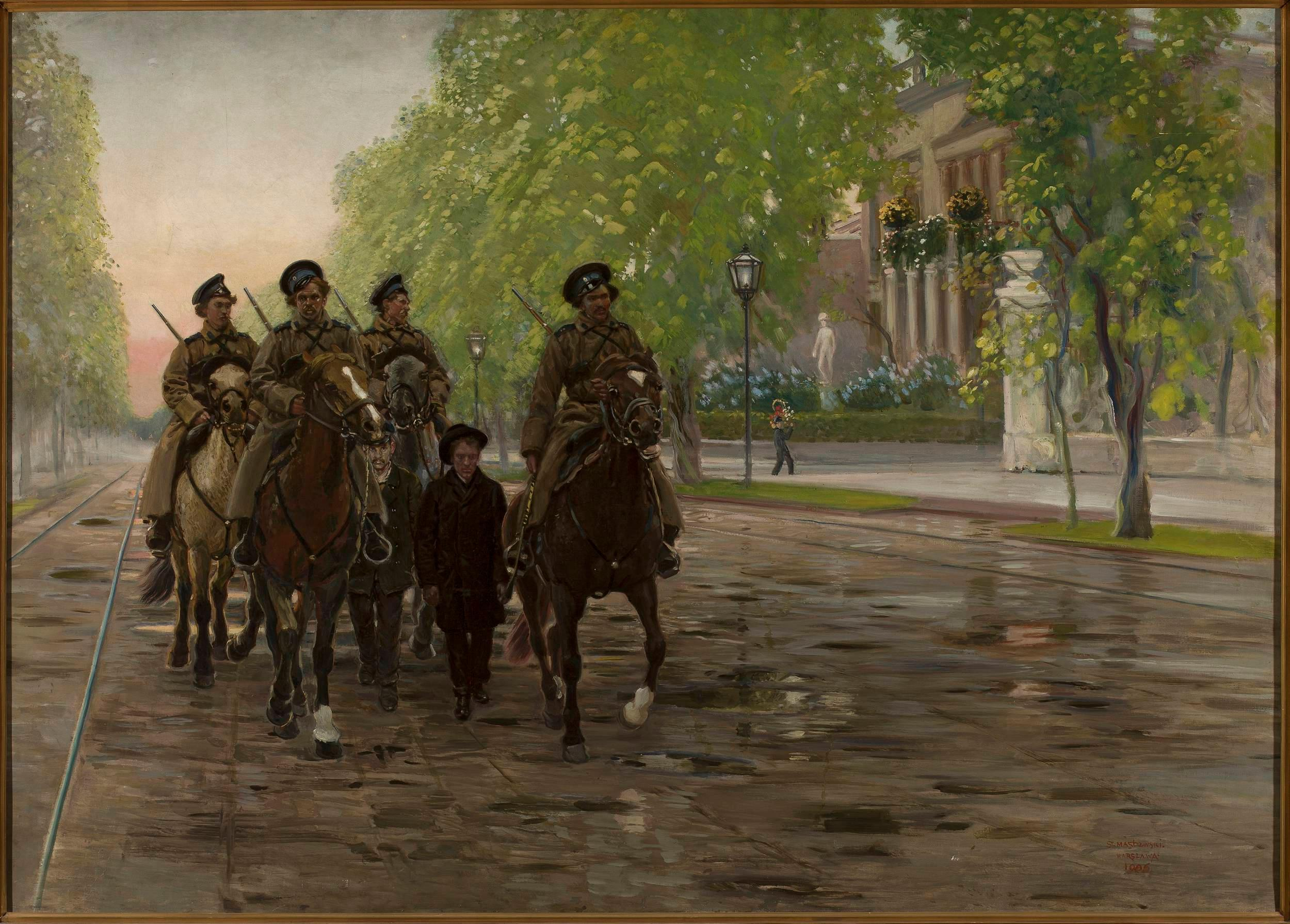
Wiosna roku 1905 (Spring of 1905 – the Cossacks party at Ujazdowskie Avenue in Warsaw), oil/canvas, 1906, National Museum in Warsaw

In Masłowski's creativity, years 1890–1907, was called a period of "the storm and ferment". Its initial phase is characterized by transition through impressionism and get away from it to find his own form. In 1897 Stanisław Masłowski became a member of the Society of Polish Artists "Sztuka" in Kraków, created at the initiative of Jan Stanisławski. A number of artists came from Warsaw e. g.: Józef Pankiewicz and Konstanty Laszczka. In 1899 Masłowski issued a number of watercolors in Aleksander Krywult Salon; this year and in 1902 he took part in the exhibitions of the Vienna Secession. In 1900 he traveled to Italy and Paris. In 1900 at the Universal Exhibition in Paris, he gained a medal award for picture "The market in the Kazimierz". In 1901 he demonstrated a small watercolours in the "Chimera" monthly editorial. Collective exhibition in 1902 in the Zachęta ends the second phase of Masłowski's creative explorations.

The restless period of 1902–1907 points out the artist's first trip in 1903 to Wola Rafałowska between Mińsk Mazowiecki and Siedlce, where he soon found his synthesis of his Polish landscape. In the following year he began a series of trips to Italy. In 1904 – to Rome, Florence, Fiesole, but also to Troki near Wilno. The special exhibition on "Zachęta" (1904) demonstrated Masłowski's 58 water-colours. In 1905–1907 Masłowski worked in his atelier in Warsaw (at Mokotowska Street) and experimented. Period of 1907–1926 was a phase of prosperity and decline of Masłowski's creativity. Plein air in Nowosiółka in Volhynia in 1908 brought 18 watercolours, which then was exhibited in the Society for the Encouragement of Fine Arts (Polish abbr.: TZSP). In 1909 and 1910 Masłowski had a solo exhibition there, and then exhibited there annually until 1914 the landscapes from Italy, Tunisia and from Polish village Wola Rafałowska. In 1913 Masłowski arranged a small exhibition of watercolours in the Galerie Léon Marseille in Paris.

In June 1914 Masłowski received an invitation to taking a position as professor at the Warsaw School of Fine Arts. However he not accepted the proposition. The outbreak of the World War I found him in the country. In April 1916 the Society for the Encouragement of Fine Arts arranged Masłowski's big collective exhibition. In December of that year he received the jubilee award of Society for the Encouragement of Fine Arts. The end of the war in 1918, brought great moral relaxation. Maslowski then painted a picture "Beliniacy" (related to name of one of Polish patriotic military divisions).

=== Interwar period ===
In 1921 Masłowski was elected a member of the Société Nationale des Beaux-Arts in Paris. In 1922 he made another trip to Italy. In 1925 a jubilee exhibition of Masłowski's works was held in the Society for the Encouragement of Fine Arts. The next year, Society for the Encouragement of Fine Arts issued a premium reproduction of his painting "Jarema's Duma" (of 1879). In 1925 Masłowski was awarded Officer's Cross of Polonia Restituta.

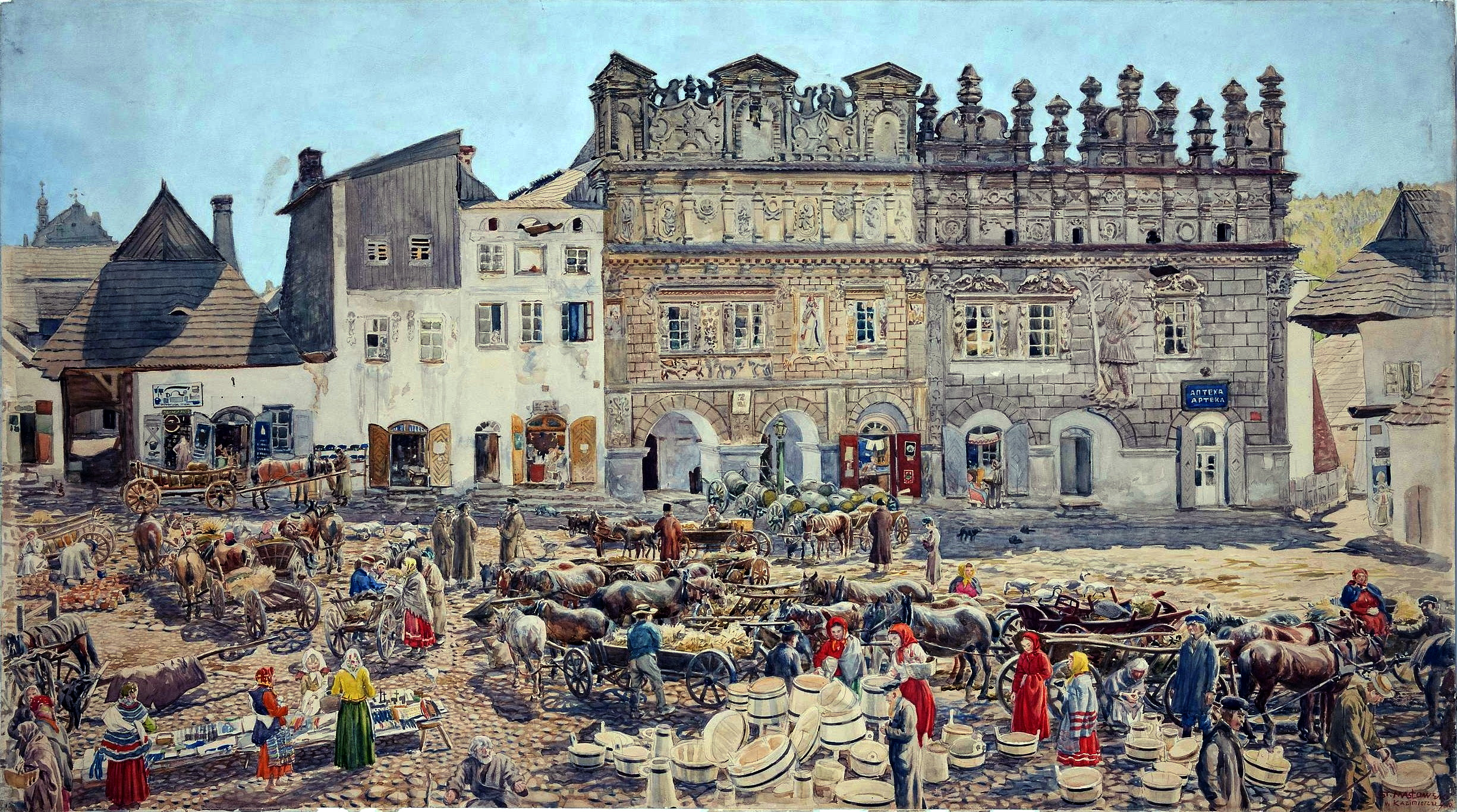
Market square in Kazimierz Dolny, watercolor, 1899, National Museum in Warsaw

In the last year of life, suffering from a heart disease, he little worked. He died 31 May 1926 in Warsaw and was buried at the Powązki Cemetery in Warsaw, in the tomb of his mother's family (section 11-1-7/8, cf. the information boards behind the entrance of the "Saint Honorata" gate in the category: "Plastycy", i. e. "Artists").

Masłowski was spending his free time on readings of both the Old Polish literature, and foreign – mostly French or Italian (his favorite reading was Montaigne's writings – the book found by the bed after his death). A peculiar fruit of his reading was a translation into Polish of Giorgio Vasari's "Lives of the Most Eminent Painters, Sculptors, and Architects" (likely for the first time before World War I)

He was married (from 20 February 1897) to Aniela Ponikowska – sister of Cezary Ponikowski, lawyer (advocate-attorney), the first President of the Supreme Advocates Council in Poland (after restore of the independence of Poland, in 1918). They had son Maciej Masłowski, an art historian (born in Warsaw 24 January 1901, died in Wysokie Mazowieckie 17 August 1976).

== Works ==
Masłowski's artistic talent occurred already at an early age. He received a silver medal in 1875 from the Academy of Fine Arts in St. Petersburg, for his school drawings. "Masłowski – recalls Henryk Piątkowski – while still very young boy, as a student at the Warsaw School of Drawing (i. e. Wojciech Gerson's drawing school) marked his outstanding talent in the first creative gusts" – and adds, that – "he learned mostly not in school, but in the environment of Polish nature, which he felt and spoke with the mastery". These observations complements and confirms relation of his fellow Miłosz Kotarbinski, in which we can read of the "very distinctive in school, and not yet appreciated Stanisław Masłowski. He was already a naturally born impressionist. Studies on the plaster casts of classical sculpture he led in purely impressive mode, in which forgiving executives completely did not complain. With vividly colourful and scenic landscape studies of nature he overtook most ardent later Impressionists."

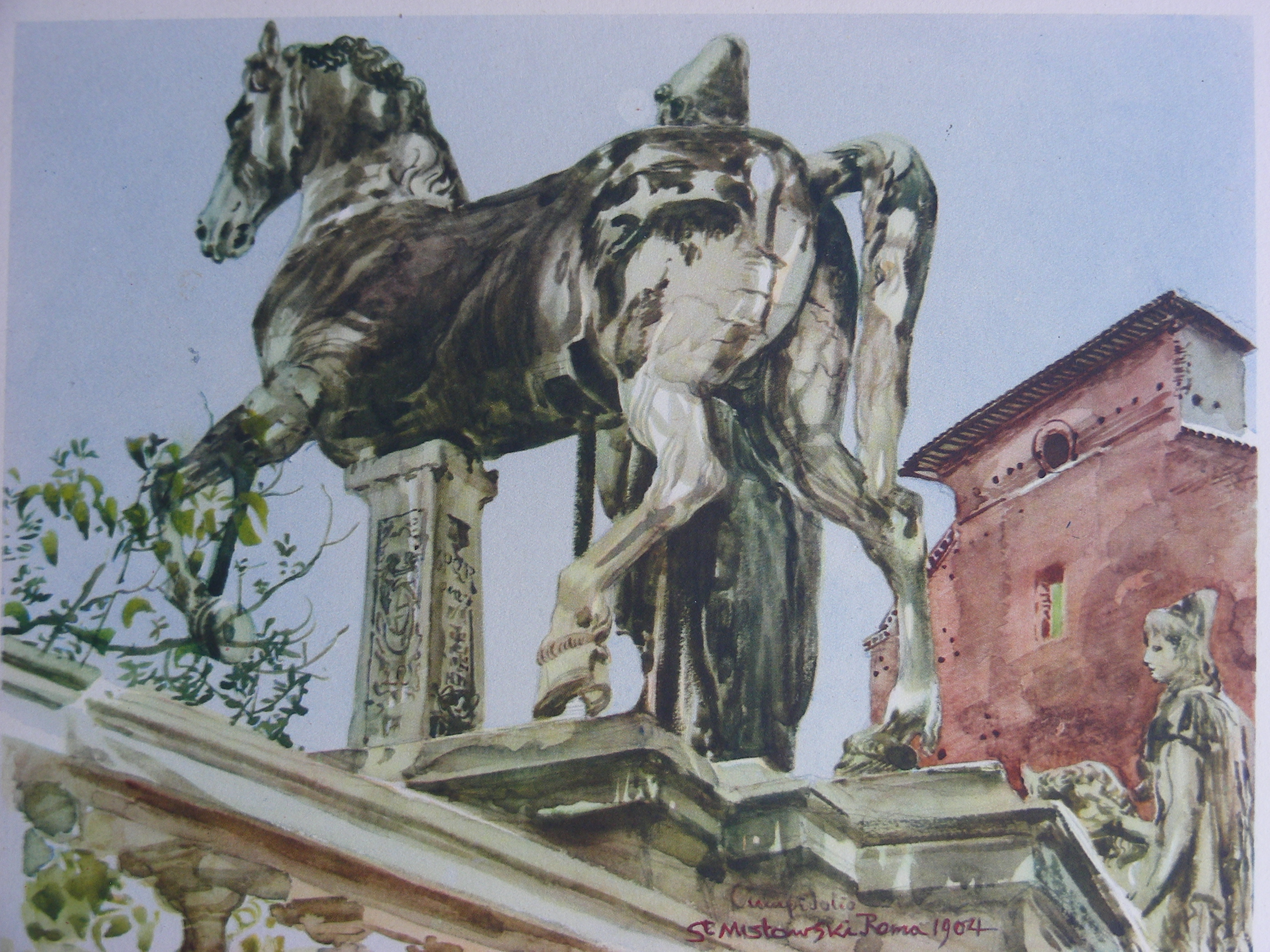
Koń na Kapitolu (The Horse statue in the entrance to Capitoline Hill – Campidoglio), Rome, watercolor, 1904, National Museum in Warsaw

The year 1875 brought in Masłowski's life the first images exhibited in the Society for the Encouragement of Fine Arts, namely: "Owczarek" (en. The Shepherd) and "Kozacy" (en. Cossacks), then – the first illustrations included in the "Kłosy" Weekly Magazine, and the first trip to Ukraine. Ukrainian topic had a strong influence on Masłowski in his youth. It was carrying parallel: blustering vigor and lyrical musing. That was the Ukraine, which Maslowski saw and began to enact in his studio compositions. It was unlike the painting of the noble-knight's and hunter's Ukraine by Juliusz Kossak, Józef Brandt and Józef Chełmoński. A numerous images of Ukrainian themes may be mentioned: "Odbicie branki" (en. Reflection from Captive – exhibited 1878), "Pożegnanie Kozaka" (en. Farewell Cossack – illustration, 1878), "Jarema's Duma" (1879), "Chłopcy w stepie" (en. Boys in the Steppe – illustration, 1879), "Noc" (en. Night – exhibited in 1880), "Tabun" (en. Herd of Horses, 1880), "Odpoczynek czumaka" (en. Chumak's Rest, 1880), "Wesele" (en. The Wedding, 1881), "Odpoczynek" (en. The Rest, 1882), and finally "Taniec Kozaków" (en. Cossacks Dance – Kozachok, 1883), which is a kind of closure and synthesis of the whole. At this, however, does not exhaust the subject matter and the topography of Masłowski's paintings created in atelier, in early stages of his work. It happens a Masovian village ("Na pastwisku" – en. On the Pasture, 1880), and even melodrama ("Niedola" – en. Misery, 1881), but still Ukraine was the main emphasis of his contemporary work. Masłowski's studio painting of this period can not be reduced to a common denominator; his realism has a number of editions – closer to the romantic sentiments, or closer to the truth of nature. Generally speaking, Masłowski's way goes from linearity to ornamentation, from value to colour, from oil to watercolour, and in total – from atelier to plein air.

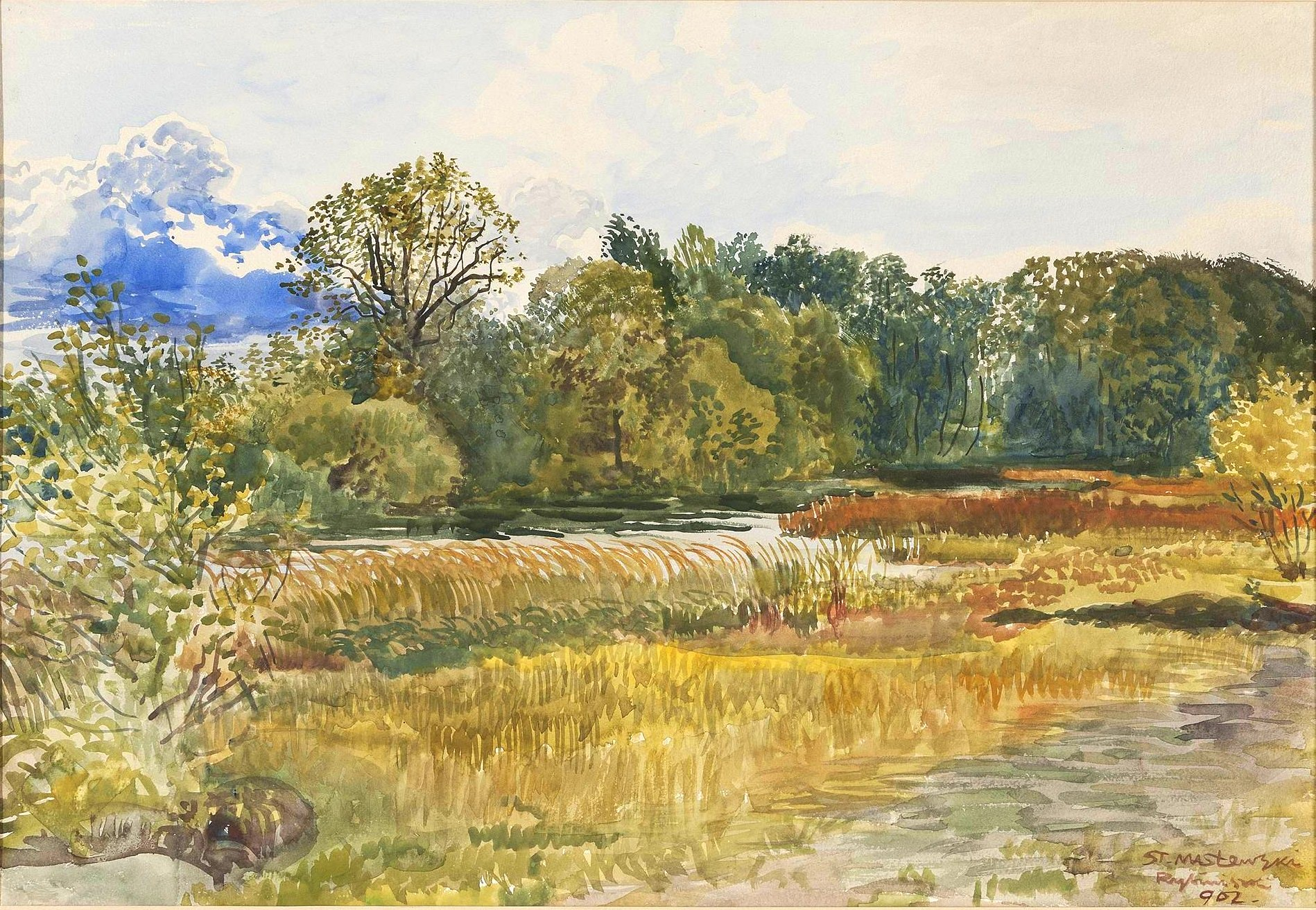
Pejzaż jesienny z Rybiniszek (Autumn Landscape of Rybiniszki), watercolour, 1902, National Museum in Warsaw

The most interesting result of the Ukrainian and other Masłowski's expeditions were quite precursory studies and sketches from nature – watercolours, pencils, and oils, including "Trójka bałagulska" (en. A Three-Horse Carriage, National Museum in Kraków), "Studium konia" (en. Study of a Horse – ibid.), "Zima" (en. Winter – ibid.), "Cyganka" (en. Gypsy woman, 1877, formerly in Bohdan Wydżga collections), "Studium jamnika" (en. Study of Dachshund), "Szczeniaki" (en. Puppies – owned by the artist's family), "Studium psa" (en. Study of a Dog), "Głowy byków" (en. Bulls Heads – National Museum in Warsaw), "Oset" (en. Thistle, between 1876 and 1878, reproduced as a vignette in the "Sfinks" Monthly Secession magazine in 1909 and 1912). Their cognitive function rapidly transformed and expanded. One of the most interesting studies arose during a few days stay in the Gypsy camp behind the Warsaw-Praga Turnpike. But first fame, and even financial success brought him no pioneer "minor sketches" but "Duma Jaremy" (en. Jarema's Duma) and "Taniec Kozaków" (en. Cossacks Dance – Kozachok, reproduced in the booklet No 11 of "Album of Polish Painters" (Polish: "Album malarzy polskich", ed. Warsaw 1885).

In 1884–1887 Stanisław Masłowski entered into a new phase of creativity. He came into a close relationship with a fellow group of painters and writers associated with "Wędrowiec" (en. "The Wanderer") weekly magazine, i. e. with Aleksander Gierymski and Antoni Sygietyński, with young Józef Pankiewicz and Władysław Podkowiński. This period already in 1884 resulted in large oil-composition done in the atelier, which is a landscape entitled "Wschód Księżyca" (en. Moonrise, National Museum in Kraków – in the "Cloth Hall" Department). In Masłowski's painting now pushed to the fore the problem of light in the night and day – the colour issue parallel to the value question. Masłowski's painting underwent profound changes during this period. This is evidenced also by following paintings: "Wschód słońca" (en. Sunrise, 1886), and next: "Zachód słońca" (en. Sunset, 1887), "Targ na Mariensztacie" (en. Market on Mariensztat, ca. 1887), "Południe" (en. Noon, ca. 1888). These images pave Masłowski's way to Impressionism. Gerson in criticism in 1888 notes: "Mr. Masłowski sent to the exhibition a "Mazovian Cottage" – a watercolour painting of rare beauty and strength". Gerson sees in it a lot of brightness, richness, strength of color, plasticity. At this time a new topic appears in Masłowski's works – the city of Warsaw. Particularly interesting came out a numerous notes from Iron-Gate Square in Warsaw. From this period come a numerous watercolor studies of Masovia, picking Masłowski in a row of "the first Polish Plein air-ists and Impressionists" (S. Rutkowski).

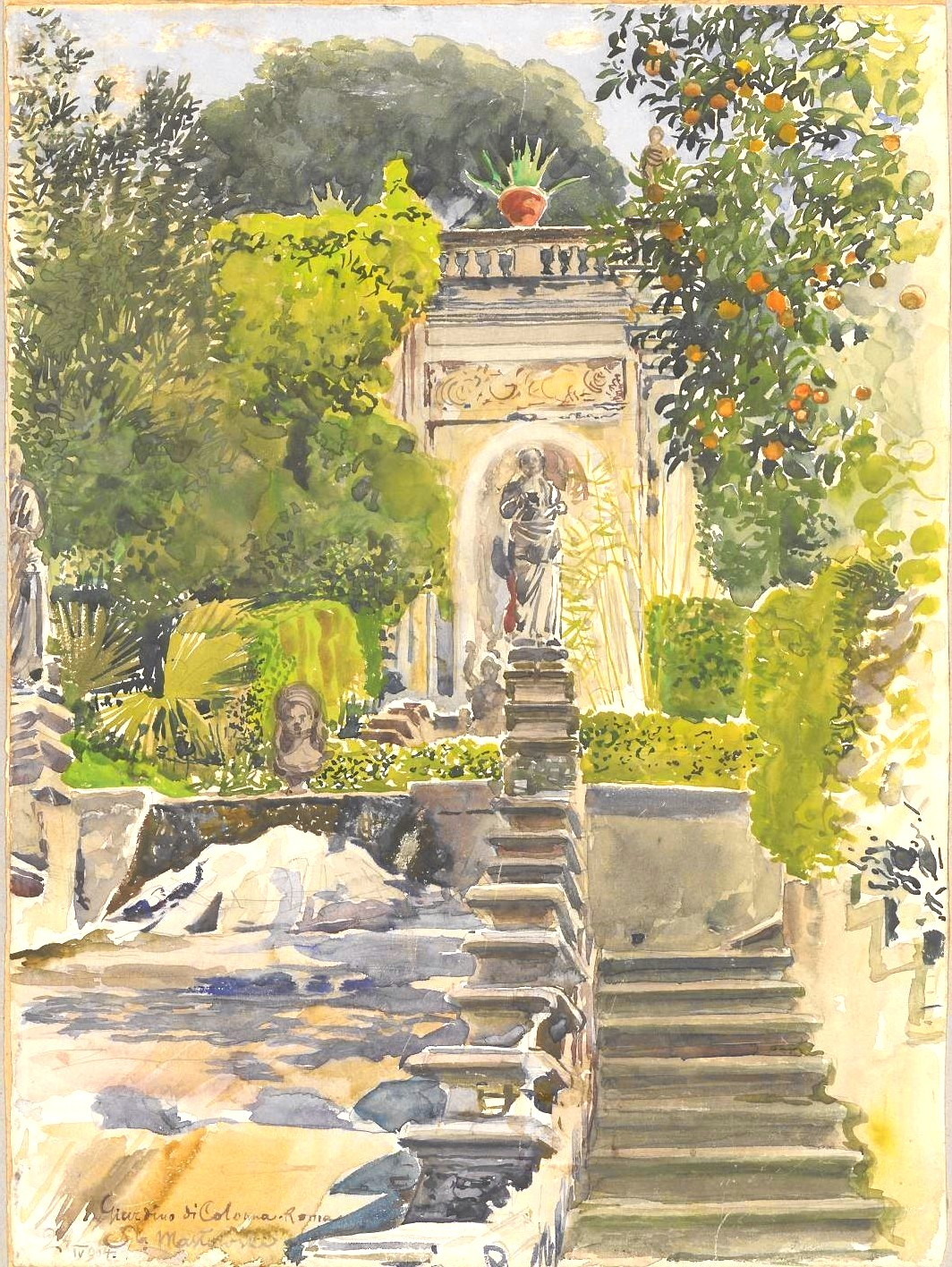
Fountain at Palazzo Colonna Garden in Rome, watercolor on paper, 1904, National Museum in Warsaw

The years 1890–1907 were a "period of storm and ferment" in Masłowski work. Its initial phase – was to go through Impressionism, and then move away from it in search of its own, separate forms. The first attempt towards a new image was reportedly "Pocztylion" (en. Postman, 1890), and then "Targ na Grzybowie" (en. Market on Grzybów district of Warsaw, 1892), "Ostatnie promienie" (en. Last rays), "Przed poborem" (en. Before the Conscription, 1892). Next years brought a numerous and still a new trials and experiments, ranging between Impressionism and Neo-romanticism. In 1893 Masłowski issued, inter alia, "Stare miasto" (en. Old Town) and "Poranek" (en. Morning) and in 1894 – "Mickiewicz and Maryla" and "Porwanie" (en. Kidnapping); in 1895 – "Wiosna" (en. Spring); in 1896 – "Sprawa o granicę" (en. The Case of the Border) and "Bociany" (en.: Storks). All these were big oil compositions. It seems that far-reaching attempt in the direction of divisionist, speckle technique of painting was image entitled: "Poranek" (en. Morning). The year 1896 brought synthesis of previous efforts, as exemplified by two major themes: "Sprawa o granicę" (en. Case of the Border) and "Bociany" (en. Storks). Great collective exhibition in the Krywult exhibition room of art in Warsaw in 1896, closed most turbulent phase of a new period of Masłowski's painting.

=== Turn of the century ===
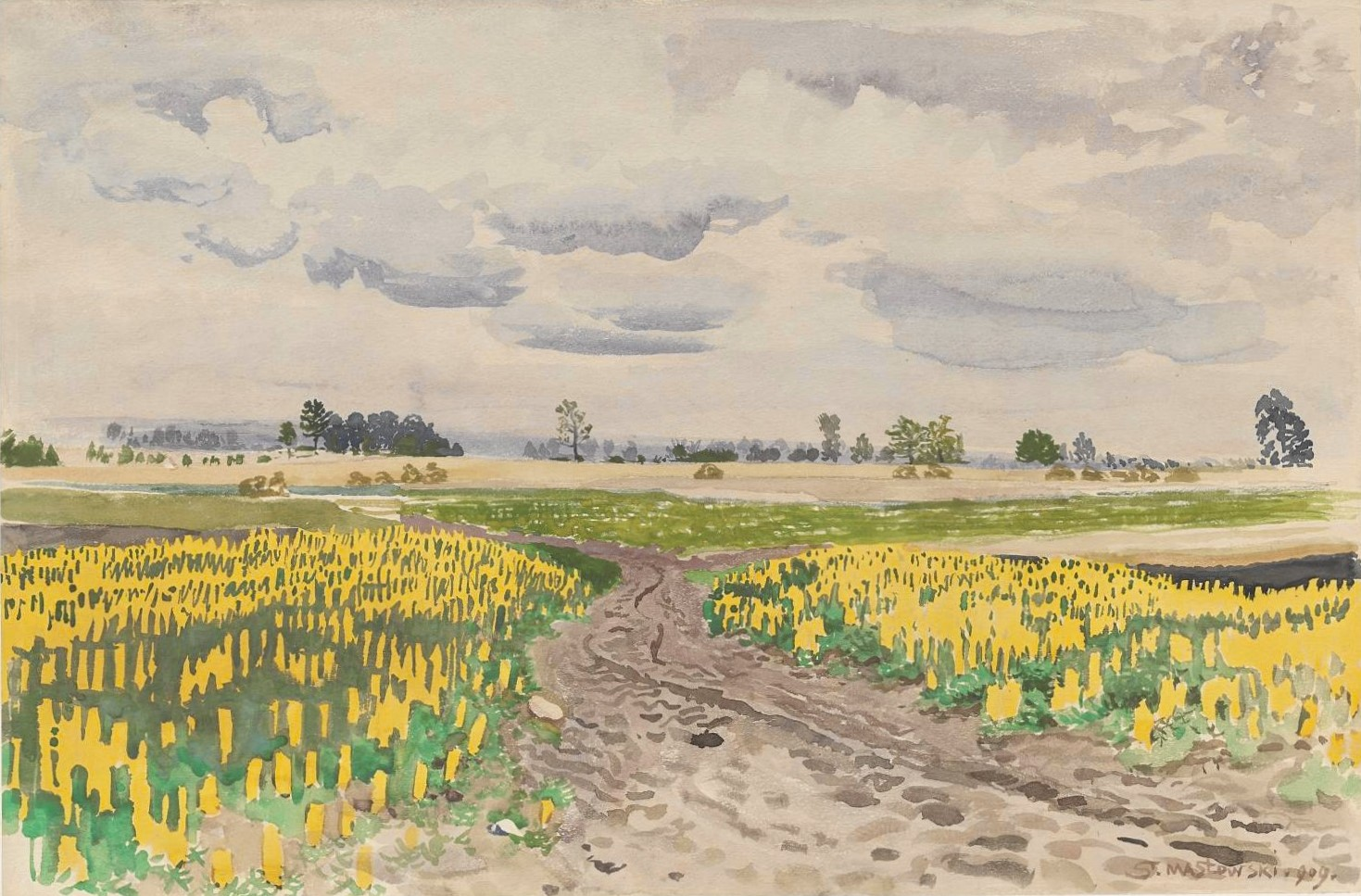
Łubin – Droga polna (Lupin – A Cart way), watercolor, 1909, National Museum in Warsaw

In 1899, Masłowski exhibited a dozen of watercolours in Krywult exhibition room. This year and in 1902 he participated in the exhibitions of the Vienna Secession. In 1900 he traveled to Italy and Paris. In 1901, in the editorial of "Chimera" monthly magazine, he presented a set of small watercolors. Here are the leading Masłowski's works of these years. Of 1898 come paintings: "Chart" (en. Greyhound), "Portret dziewczynki" (en. Portrait of a Girl), "Giewont we mgle" (en. Giewont Tatra Peak in the Mist); then of 1899 – "Rynek w Kazimierzu" (en. Market Square in Kazimierz), and "Kapliczka w Kazimierzu" (en. A Wayside Shrine in Kazimierz), and finally of 1902 – a big image of "Cyganka" (en.: Gypsy Woman), landscapes of Rybiniszki (former Polish Livonia now in Eastern Latvia), "Wrona" (en. Crow), "Kamienica pod Okrętem" (en. "Tenement under Ship" in Warsaw Old Town). It is worth noting that these are only watercolors.

A Picture "Rynek w Kazimierzu" (en. Market Square in Kazimierz) was awarded the medal on the Universal Exhibition in Paris (1900). A collective show of his paintings in 1902, in the Zachęta (i. e. Society for Encouragement of Fine Arts) ends the second phase of Masłowski's explorations. Of the numerous reviews deserves reminder E. Niewiadomski's sentence: "Masłowski's place will be in the same series, in which were artists otherwise of different measure: Kossak Juliusz, Matejko, Grottger, Chełmoński, Piechowski. He is a national artist through and through. National are the motives of his works and their concepts, the national temperament, life gushing from images, colour strength [...]".

In 1903 Masłowski tried his hand in decorative arts – painting a ceiling in the ballroom and chapel choir in a palace at Supraśl.

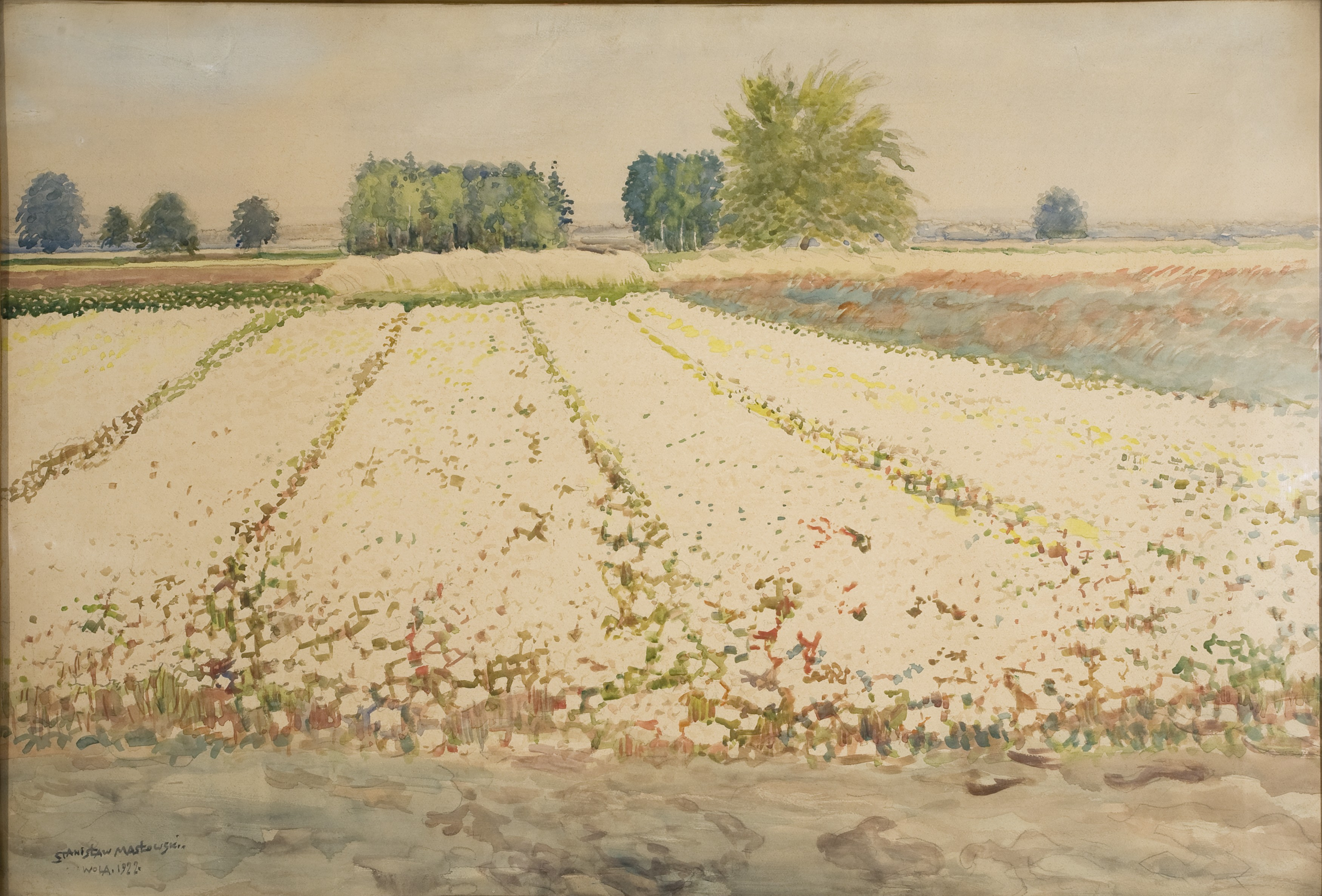
Gryka (Buckwheat Field Landscape), watercolour, Wola Rafałowska, 1922 (National Museum in Kraków, courtesy of Photo Laboratory, National Museum in Kraków)

The special exhibition in the "Zachęta" (1904) demonstrated 58 Masłowski's watercolours. In 1905–1907 Masłowski worked experimenting in his Warsaw studio (at Mokotowska street). He did illustrations for "Pan Tadeusz" (special edition in 1905 for subscribers of "Rozwój" Publishers in Łódź), as well as other figure compositions, for instance a full of rhythm and expressive image of "Pijani Chłopi" (en. Drunken Peasants, 1906, National Museum in Warsaw), the scene of the Revolution of 1905 – "Patrol Kozaków" (en. Cossacks Patrol"), also known as "Wiosna 1905" (en. Spring 1905) or "Świt 1906" (en. Dawn 1906 – painting of 1906, Museum of Art in Łódź), picture "Pierwsze żyto" (en. First Rye, 1907) and rare attempt of symbolism in Masłowski's work – Świątynia Sztuki" (en. The Temple of Art, 1907, lost). In autumn of 1907 the charming landscapes of Radziejowice was created – combining graphic lines with the painterly clarity of stains, such as "Pond in Radziejowice" (1907). Plein air in Nowosiółka on Volhynia in 1908 brought 18 watercolors exhibited in the "Zacheta" – Society for the Encouragement of Fine Arts.

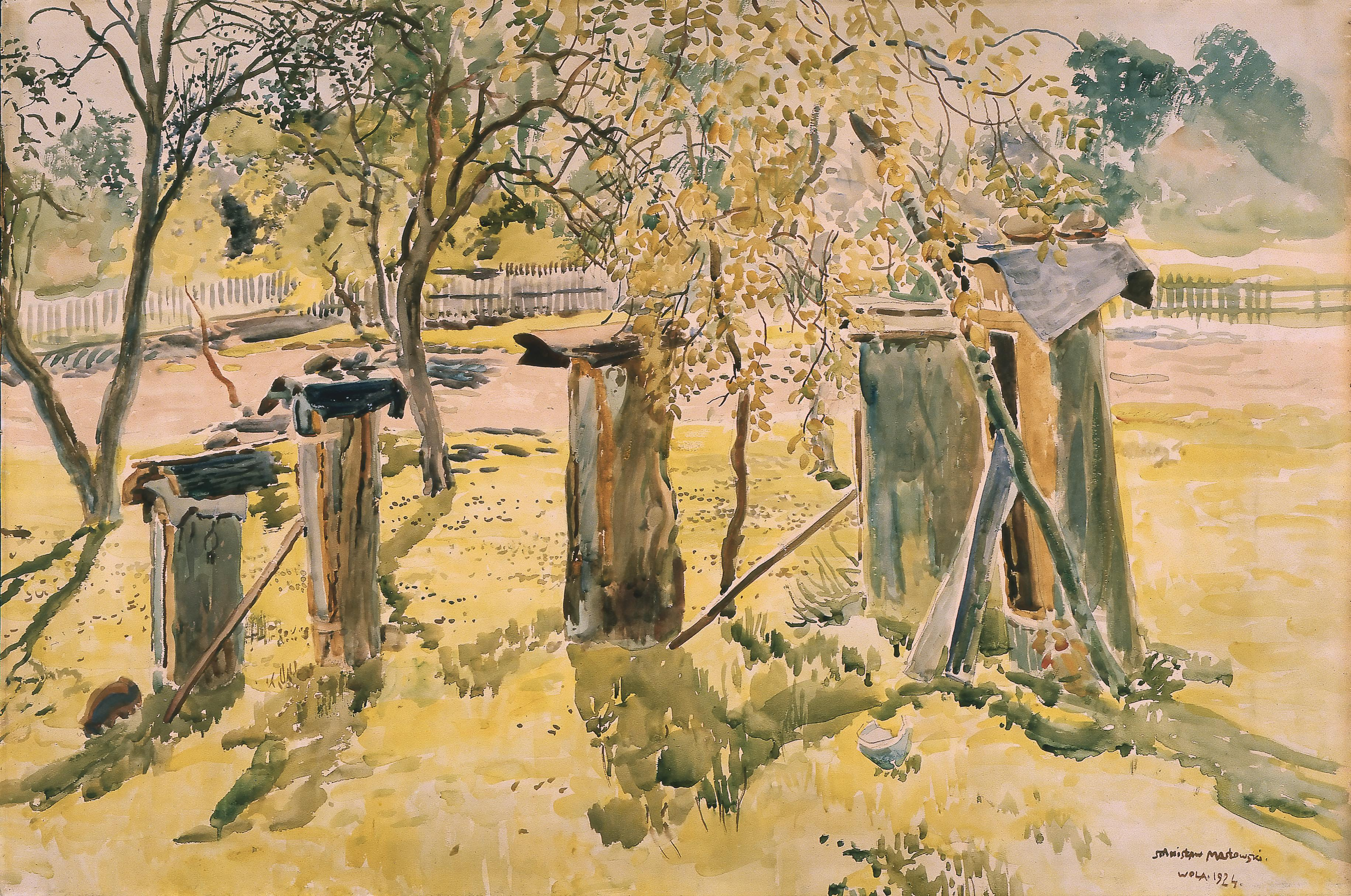
Ule (Beehives), watercolor, 1924, painted in Wola Rafałowska, (Silesian Museum in Katowice)

As already mentioned, in 1909 and 1910 took place Masłowski's individual exhibitions in the Zachęta. From this period (1909) originates, inter alia, watercolor, entitled "Maki" (The Field of Corn Poppies). In the following years, until 1914, he exhibited in the "Zacheta" – Society for the Encouragement of Fine Arts the landscapes of Italy, Tunisia and Polish of Wola Rafałowska village, including: "Podwórze w Villi d'Este" (en. Courtyard at Villa d'Este), "Zatoka Neapolitańska" (en. Bay of Naples), "Krowy" (en. The Cows), "Białe maki" (en. White Poppies – the field of corn poppies), "Chojar" (en. A Single Old pine-Tree), "Motyw z Taorminy" (en. Theme from Taormina), "Beduinka" (en. Bedouin Woman), "Wejście do Pałacu Beja" (en. Entrance to the Bey Palace), "Kawiarnia arabska" (en. Arabic Cafe) and other. All of them presented an unusual wealth of colour and decoration, a rare freshness and directness of vision. Examples of watercolor paintings from this period are the images of "Poppies" and "A Hollyhocks in the Garden" (1911). There were also oil pictures at that time.

Soon he returned to landscape painting. Works of this final period was uneven. The most outstanding works of this time include watercolor paintings from a trip to Italy in 1922 and some landscapes of Wola Rafałowska village, such as a few from the year 1924: "Ule" (en. The Beehives – the Silesian Museum in Katowice), "Gryka" (en. The Field of Buckwheat) and "Łubin" (en. The Field of Yellow Lupin – National Museum in Warsaw).

== Gallery ==
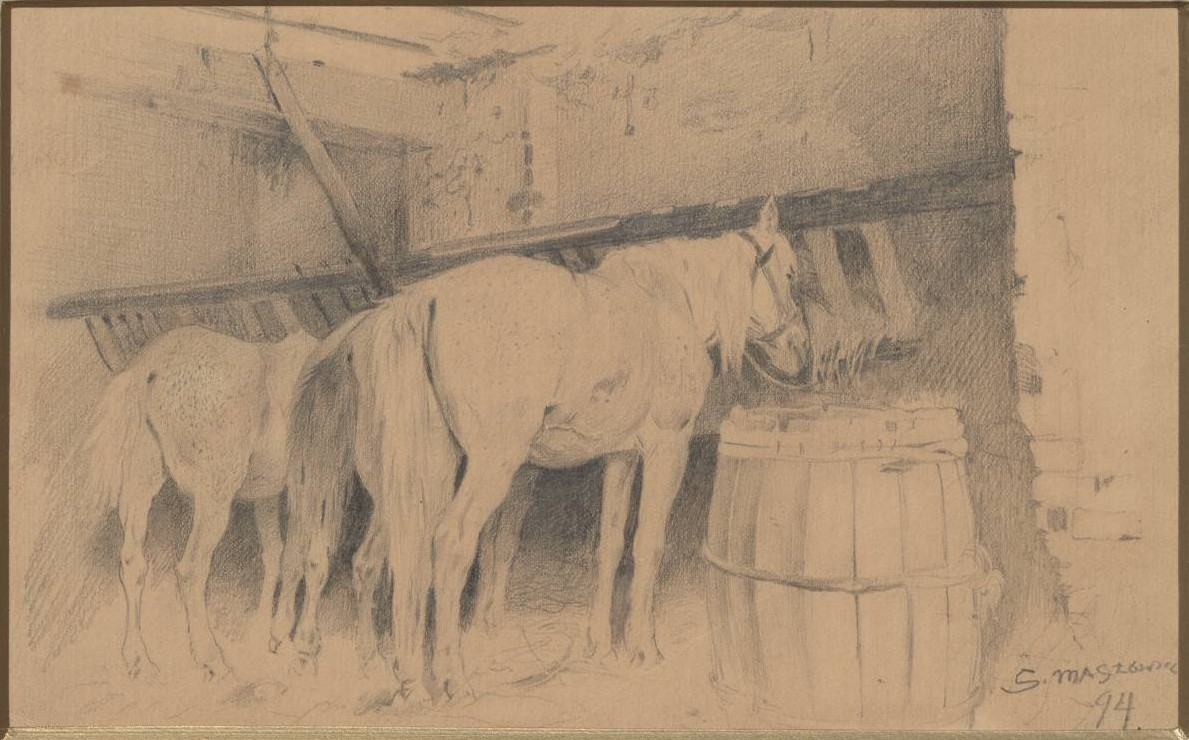
Konie w stajni (Horses in a stable), drawing, ca 1875 (sic!) (National Museum in Warsaw)

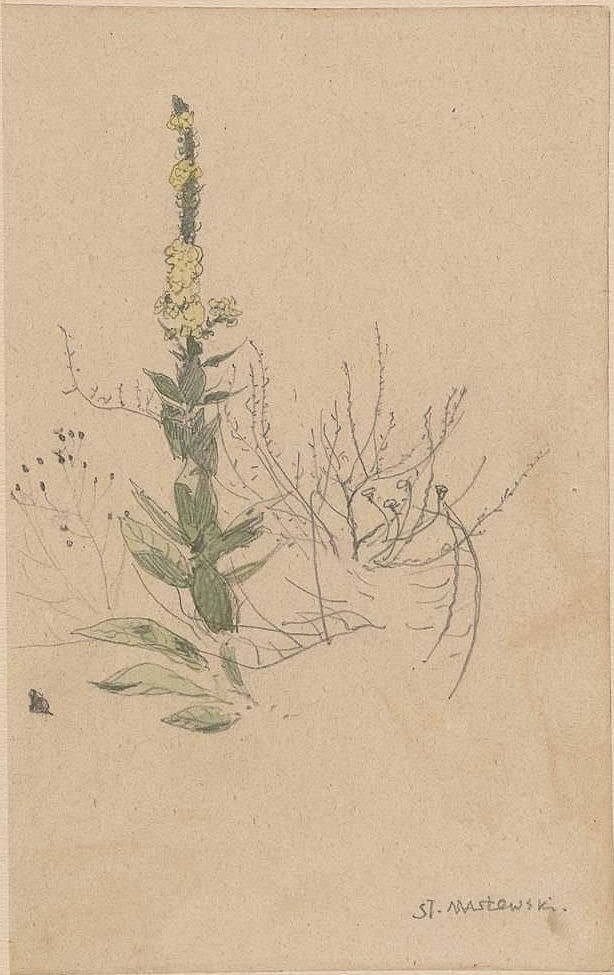
Mullein, pencil and watercolor on paper, ca. 1875 (National Museum in Warsaw).

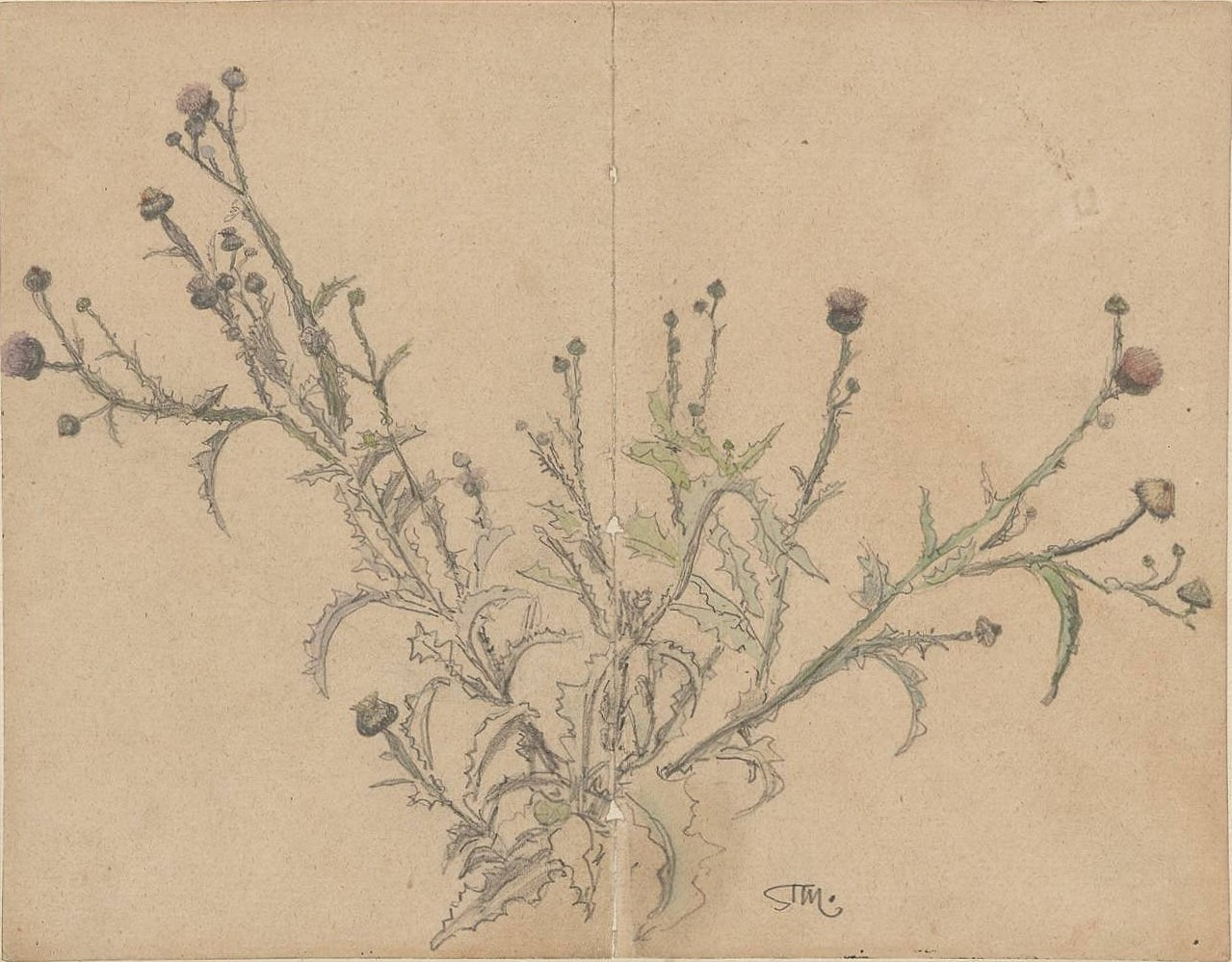
Thistle, pencil and watercolor on cardboard, ca. 1876-1878 (National Museum in Warsaw)

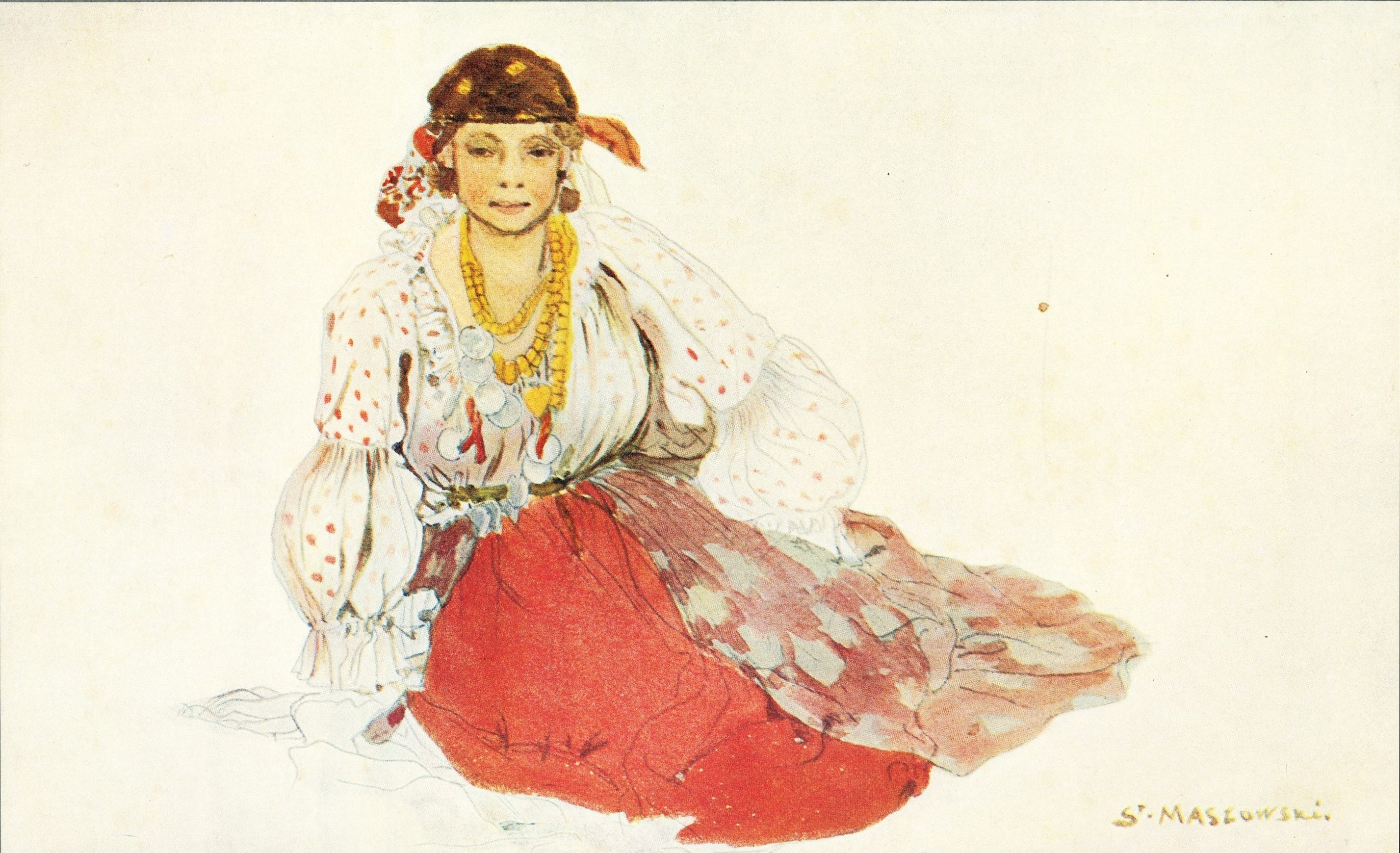
Cyganka (A Gypsy Woman), watercolour, 1877 (?).

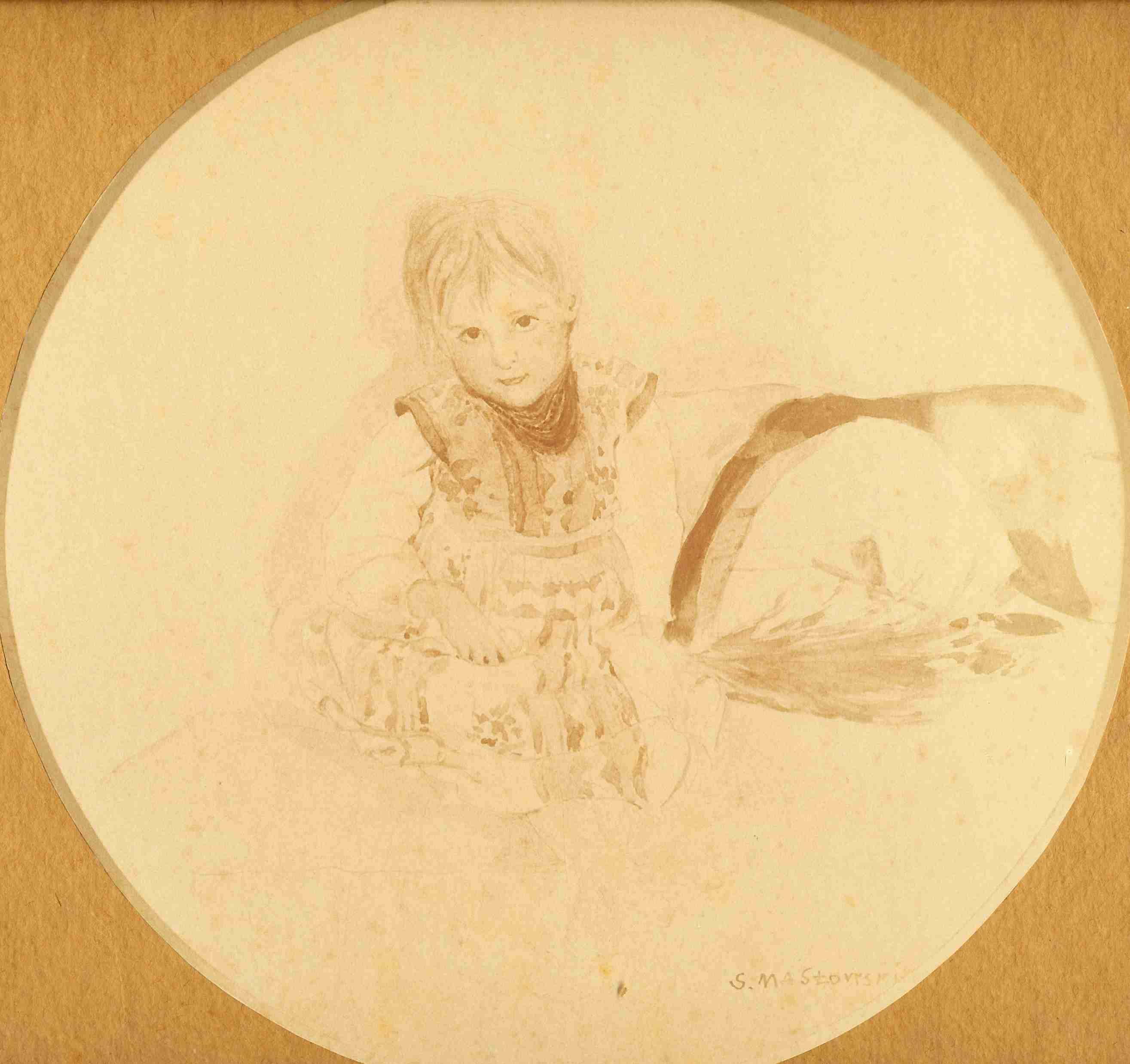
Dziewczynka ukraińska (A Ukrainian Girl), watercolour, ca. 1878

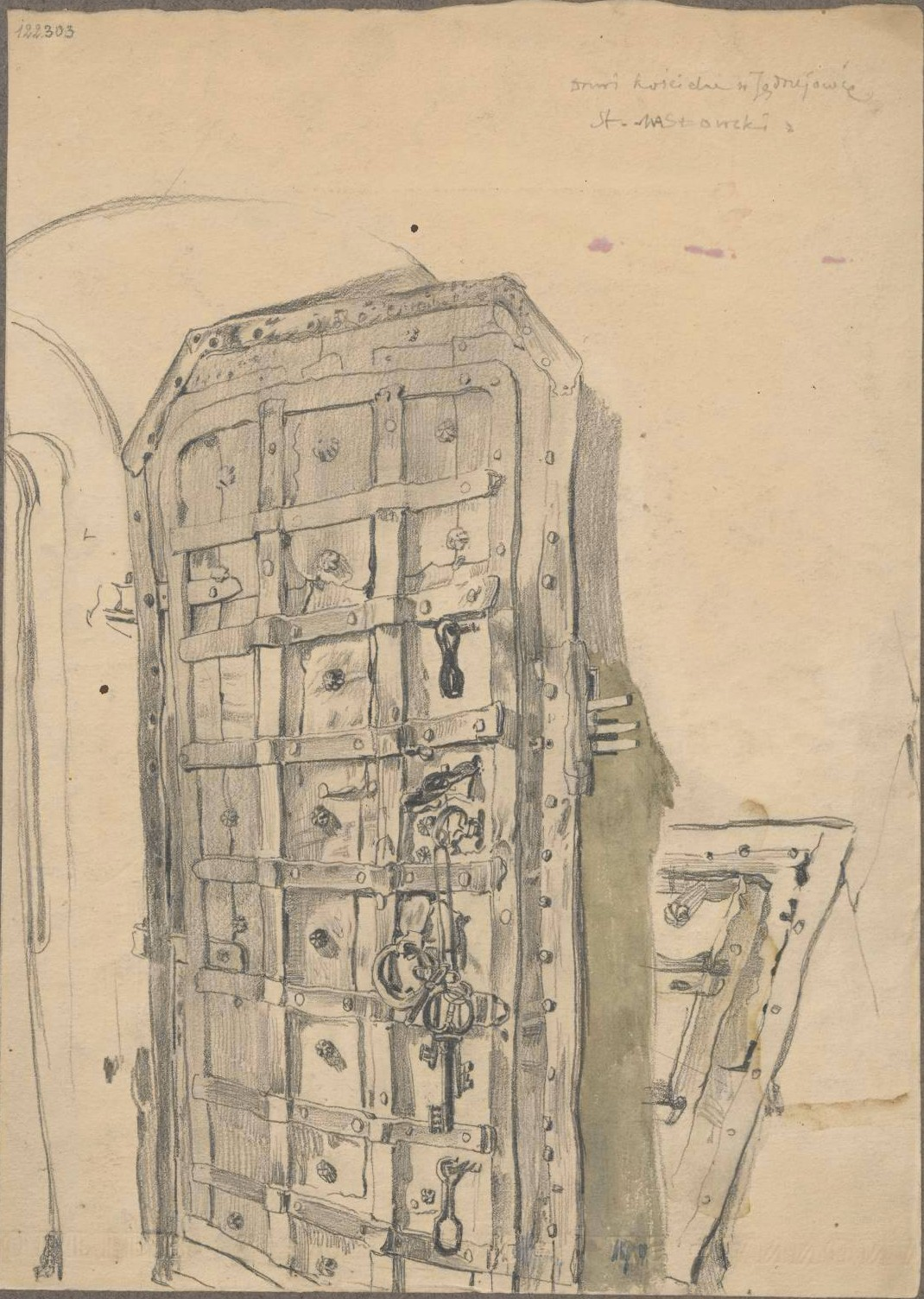
Studium rysunkowe drzwi koscioła w Jędrzejowie (The Gate of the Church in Jędrzejów), a study in pencil on paper, ca. 1878 (National Museum in Warsaw)

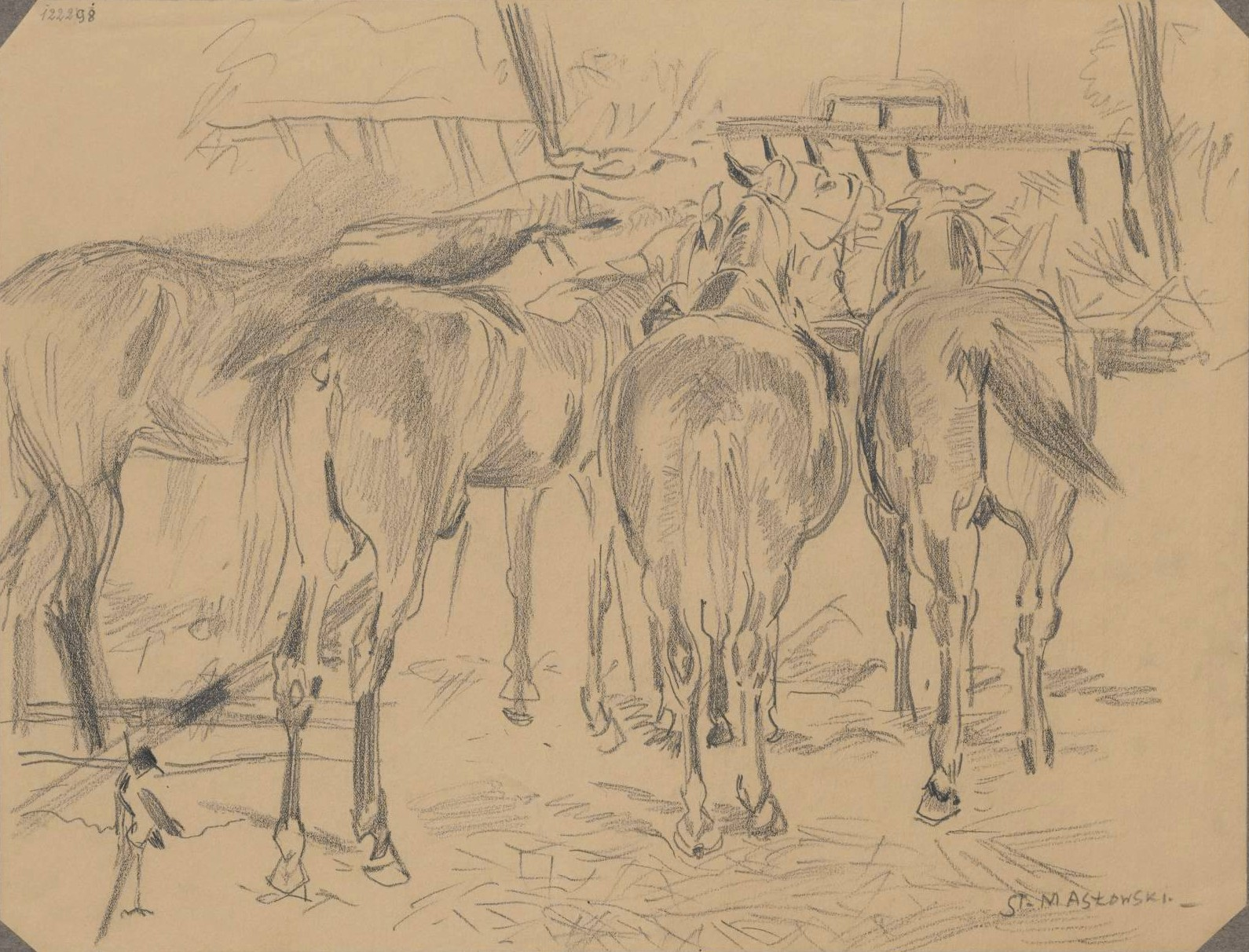
Konie przy żłobie (Horses at the Crib), study in pencil on paper, ca 1880 (National Museum in Warsaw)

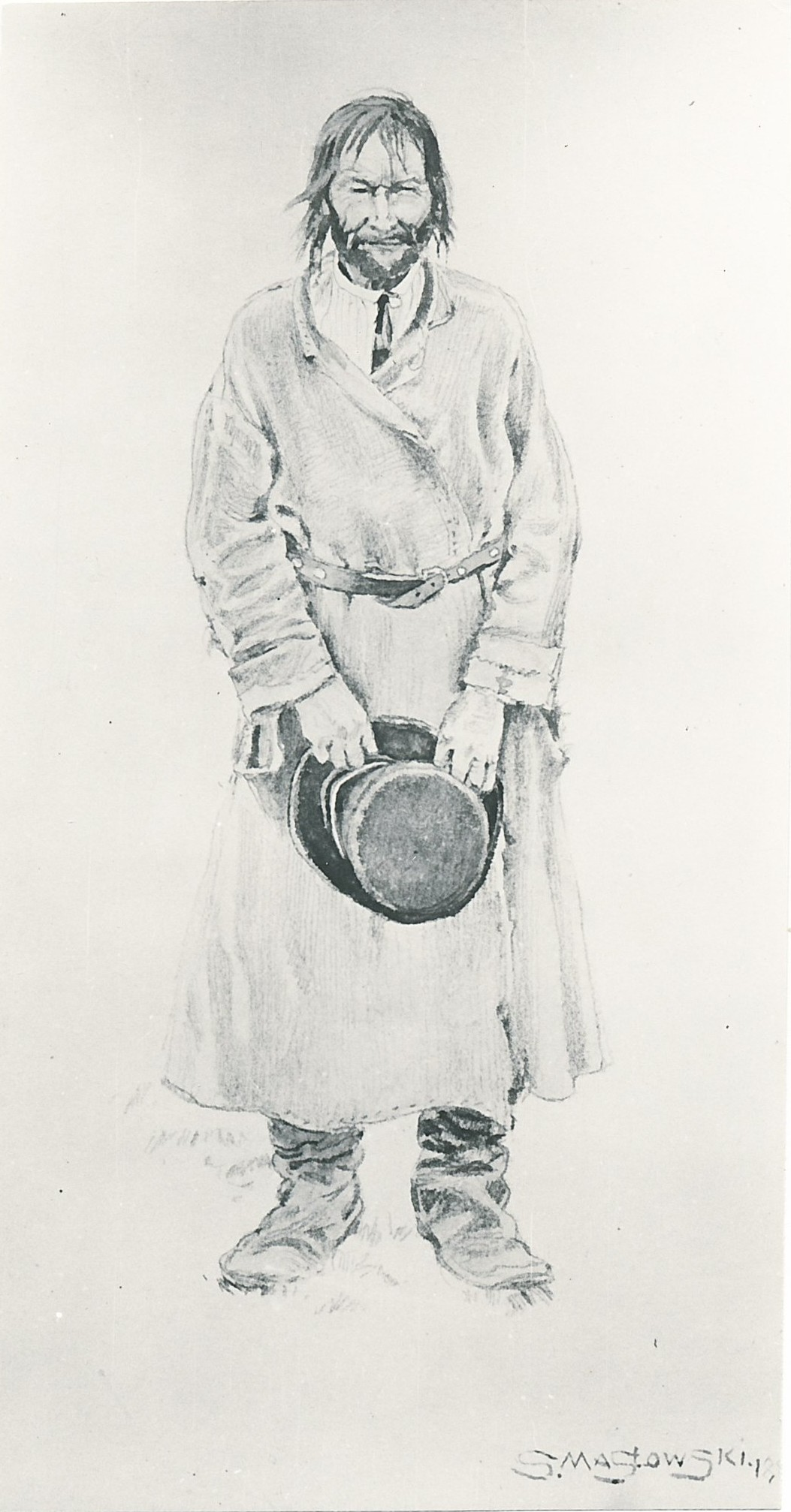
Sołtys Witosek (Witosek - A Village Administrator), drawing on paper, 1880

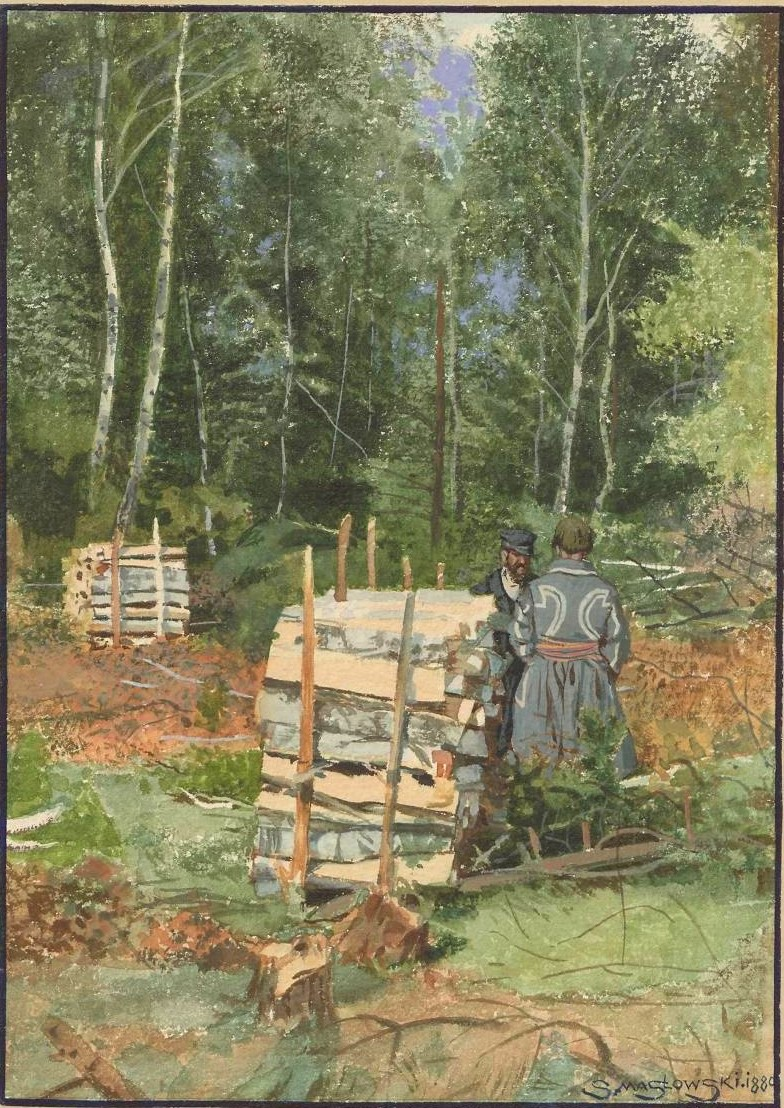
Poręba (Clearing in the Forest), watercolor, gouache and India ink on paper, 1880, (National Museum in Warsaw)

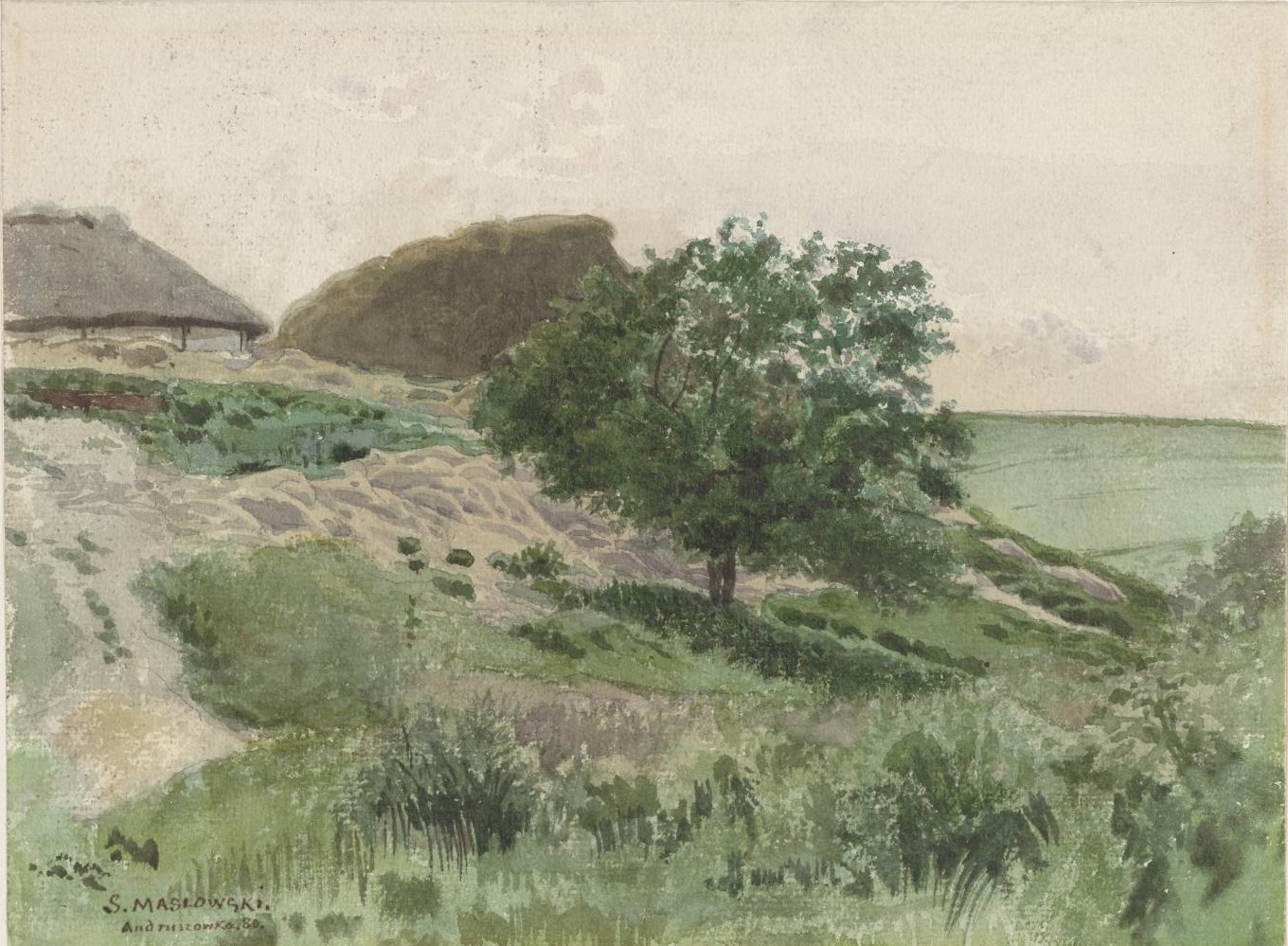
Andruszowka, Ukrainian Landscape of Andruszowka, watercolor, 1880, (National Museum in Warsaw)

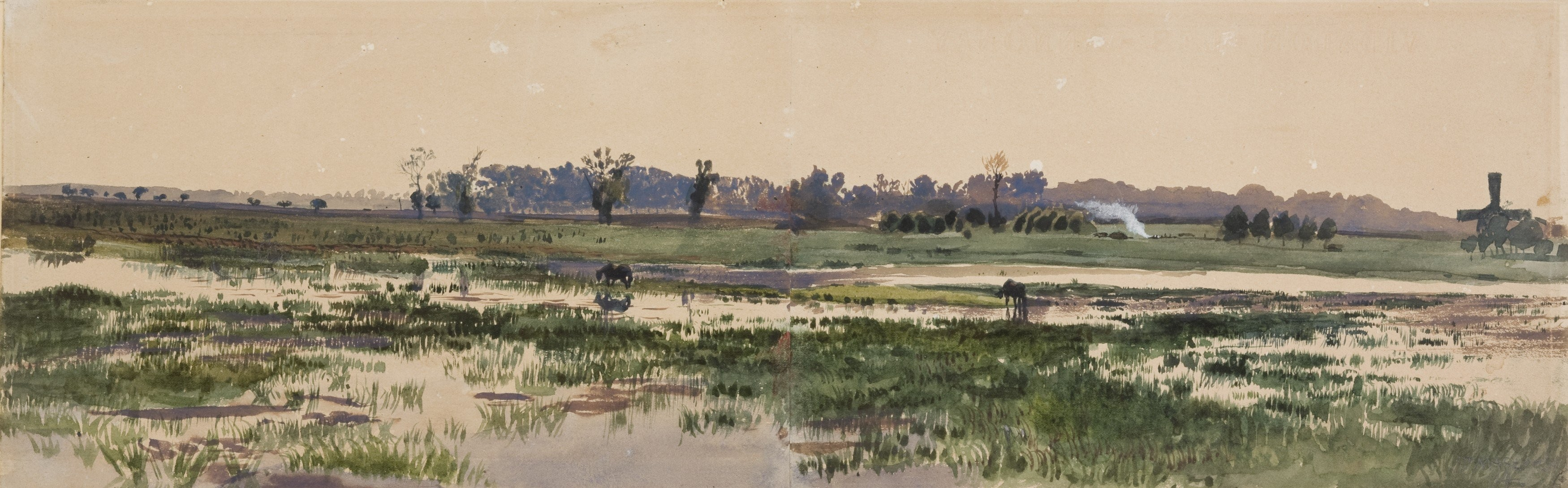
Marsh Landscape, ca 1880 or later (sign.1894), watercolor, gouache, pencil, collection of National Museum in Kraków

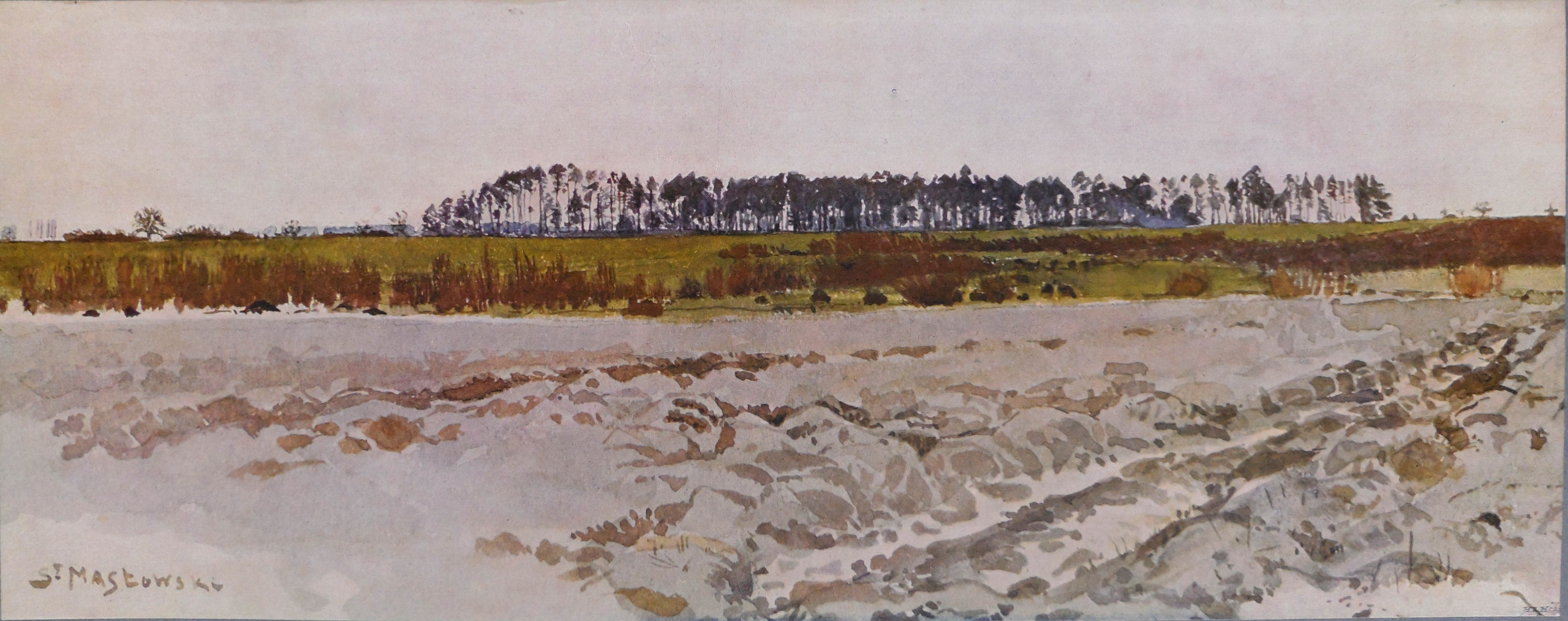
Lasek (Grove Landscape), watercolour, ca 1880–1890

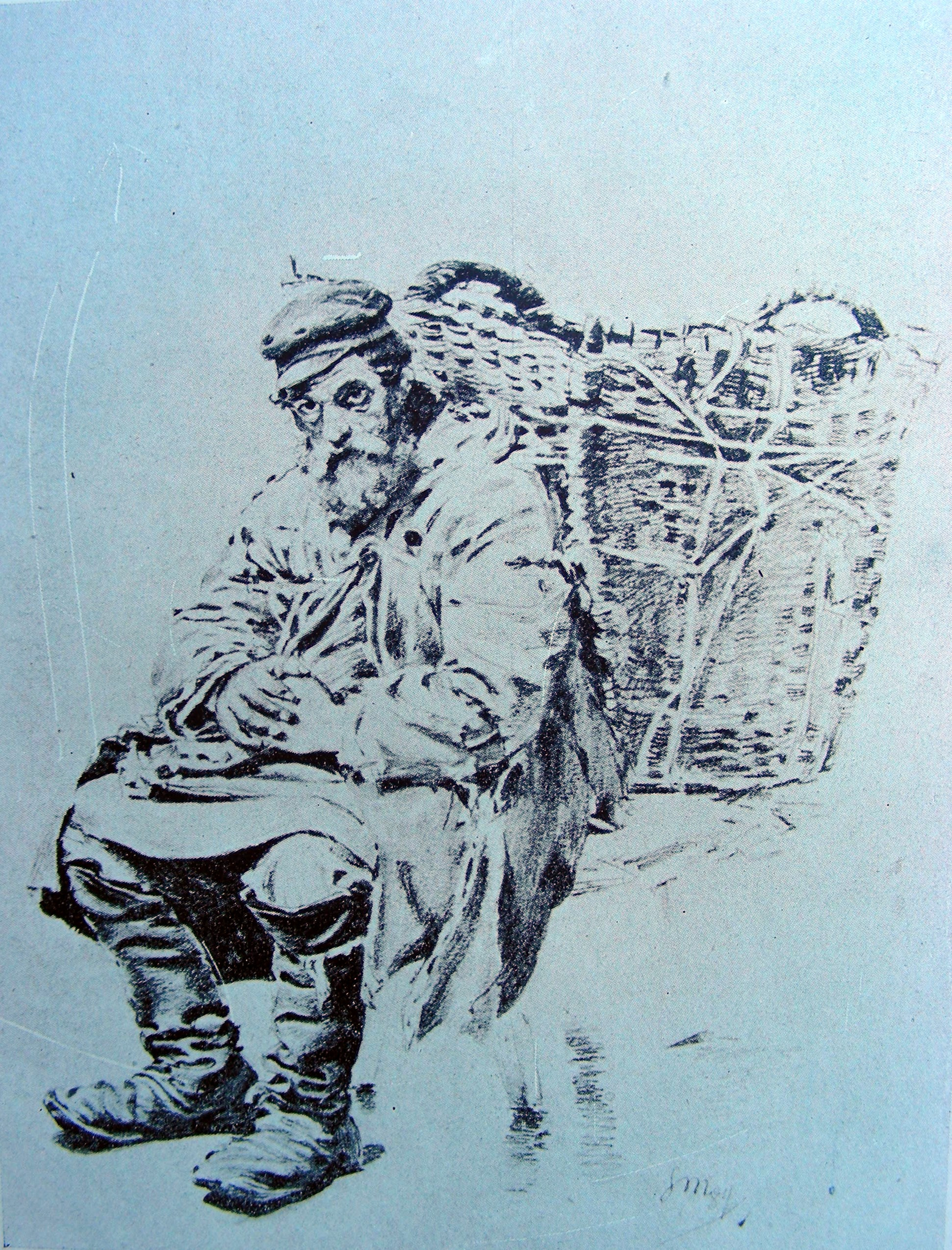
Tragarz (A Porter), a study in pencil on paper, 1884 (Historical Museum of Warsaw, phot. J. Mierzecka)

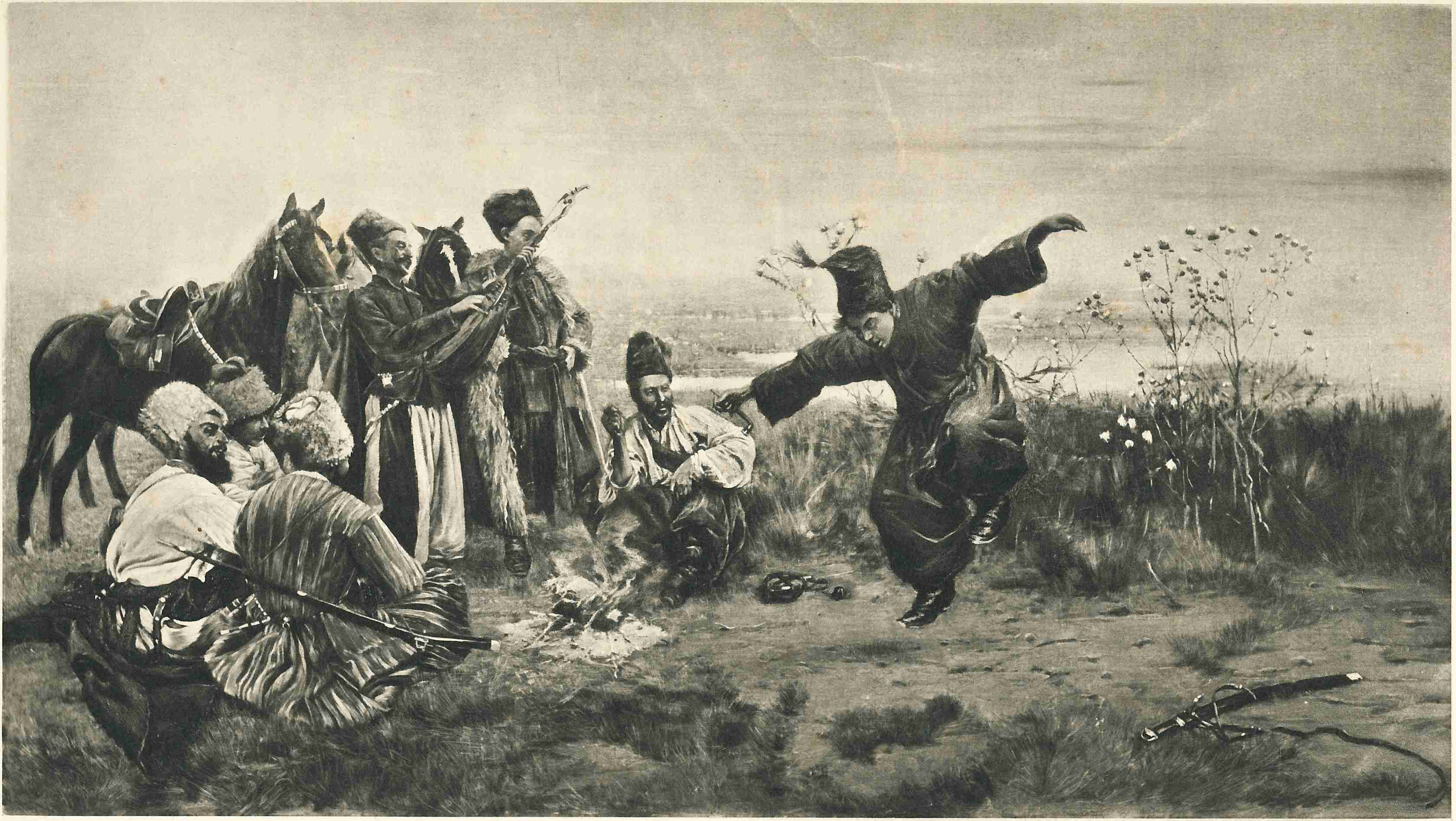
Cossacks Dance – Kozachok, oil/canvas, 1883

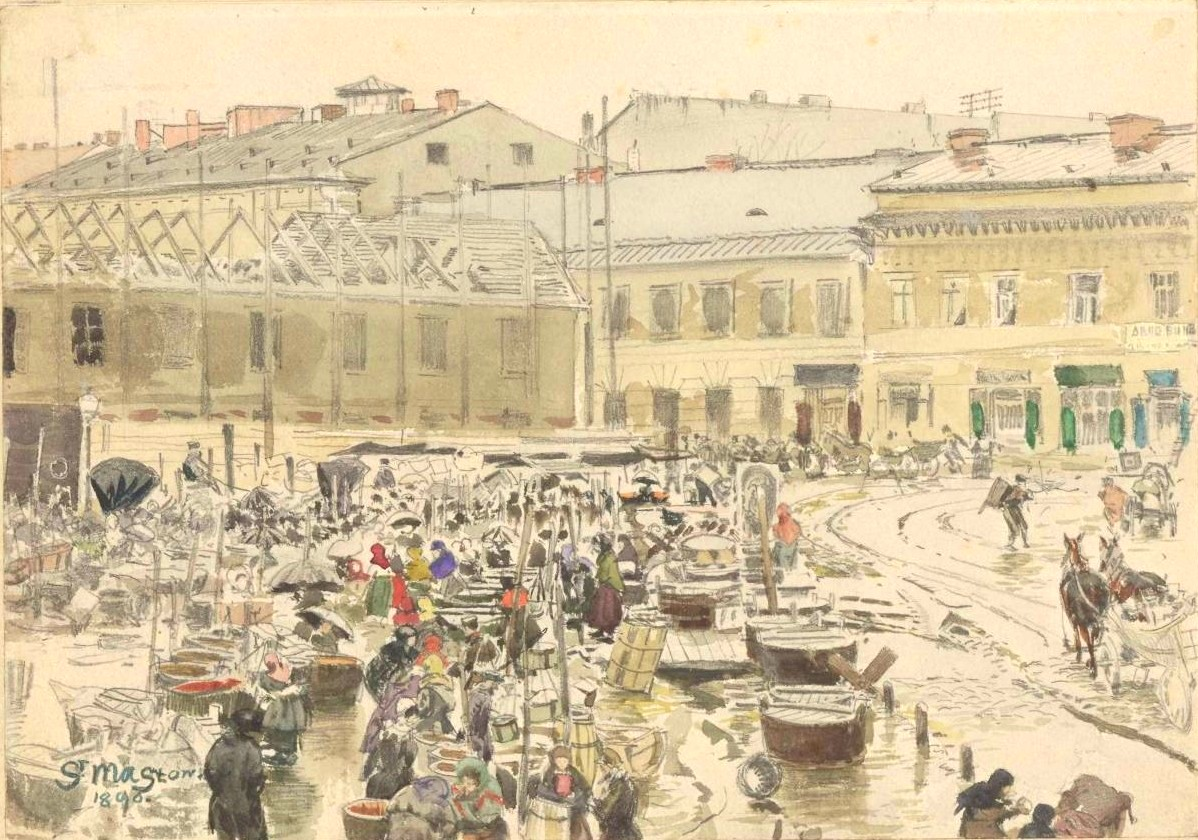
Targ za Żelazną Bramą ("Iron-Gate Square" Marketplace in Warsaw), watercolor, 1884(sic!) (National Museum in Warsaw)

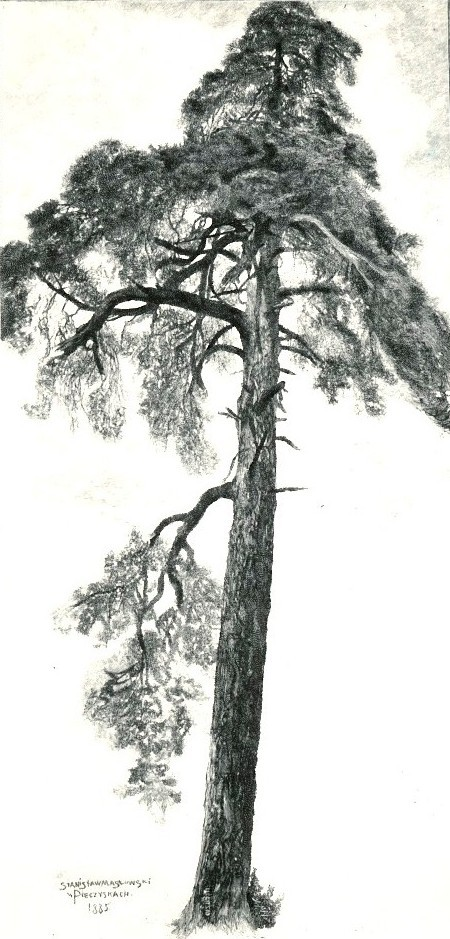
Pine Tree in Pieczyska Village, Poland, 1885

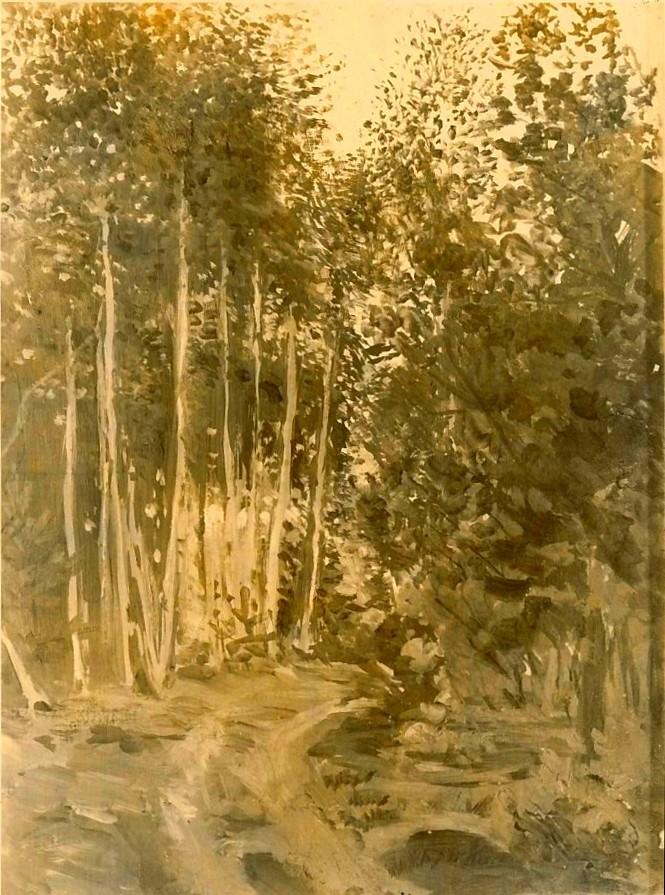
Birch Bosket, painting, of ca 1890

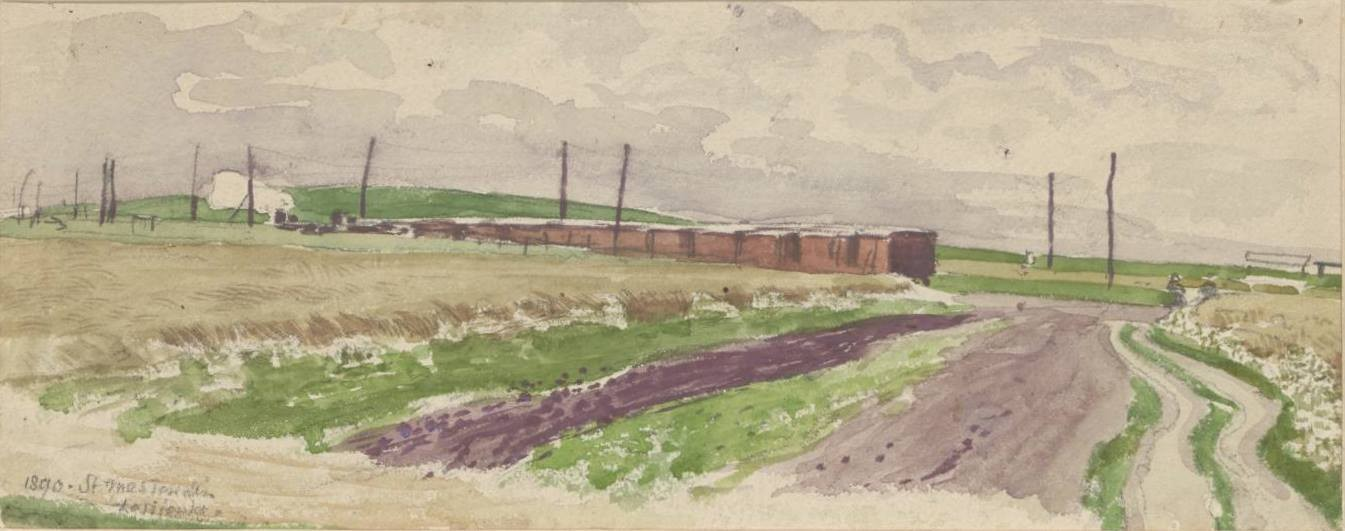
Goods Train, landscape with a goods train, watercolour, 1890, (National Museum in Warsaw)

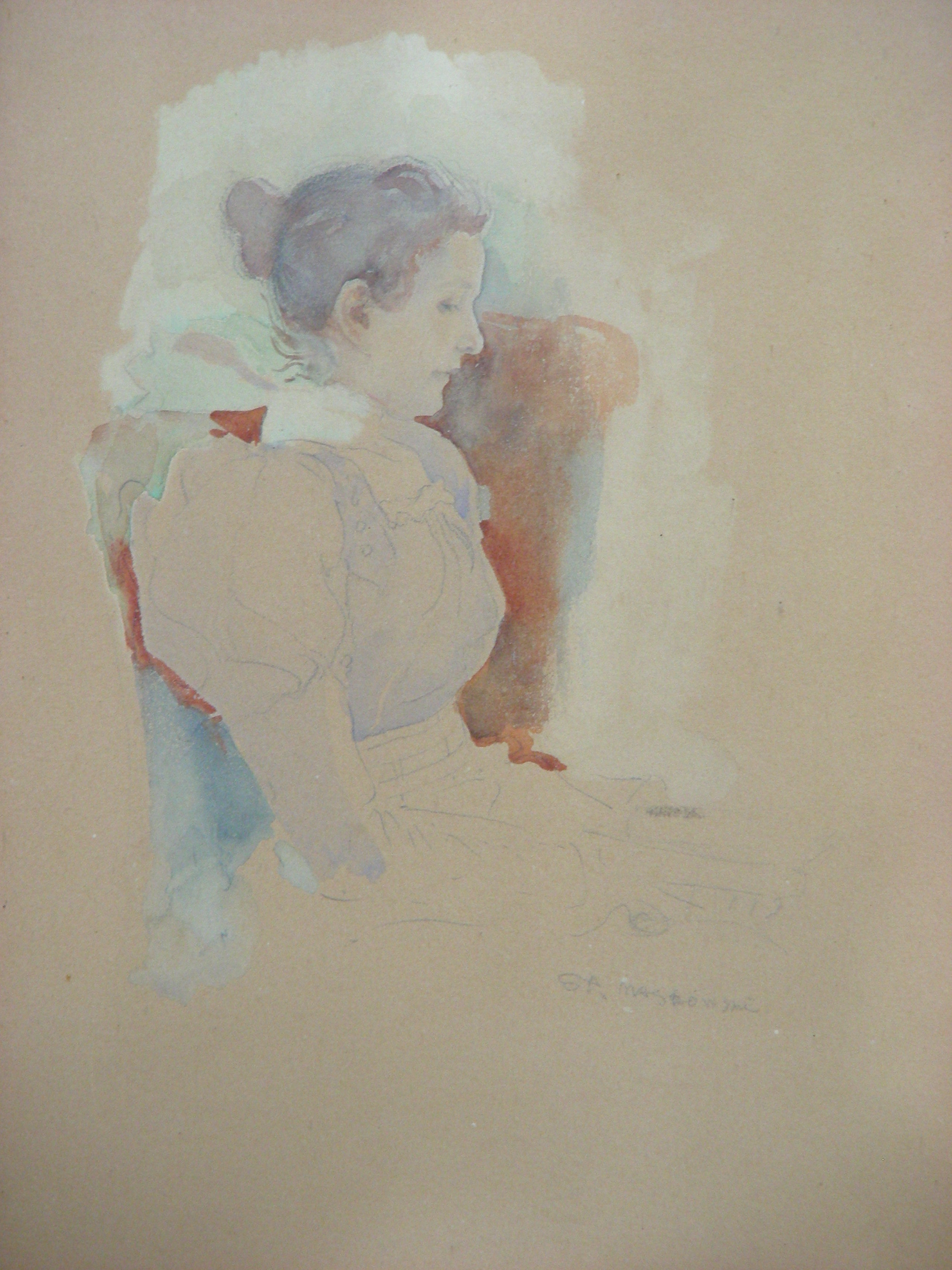
Portret żony artysty (Portrait of Artist's Wife), watercolor on paper, 1897 (artist's family collection)

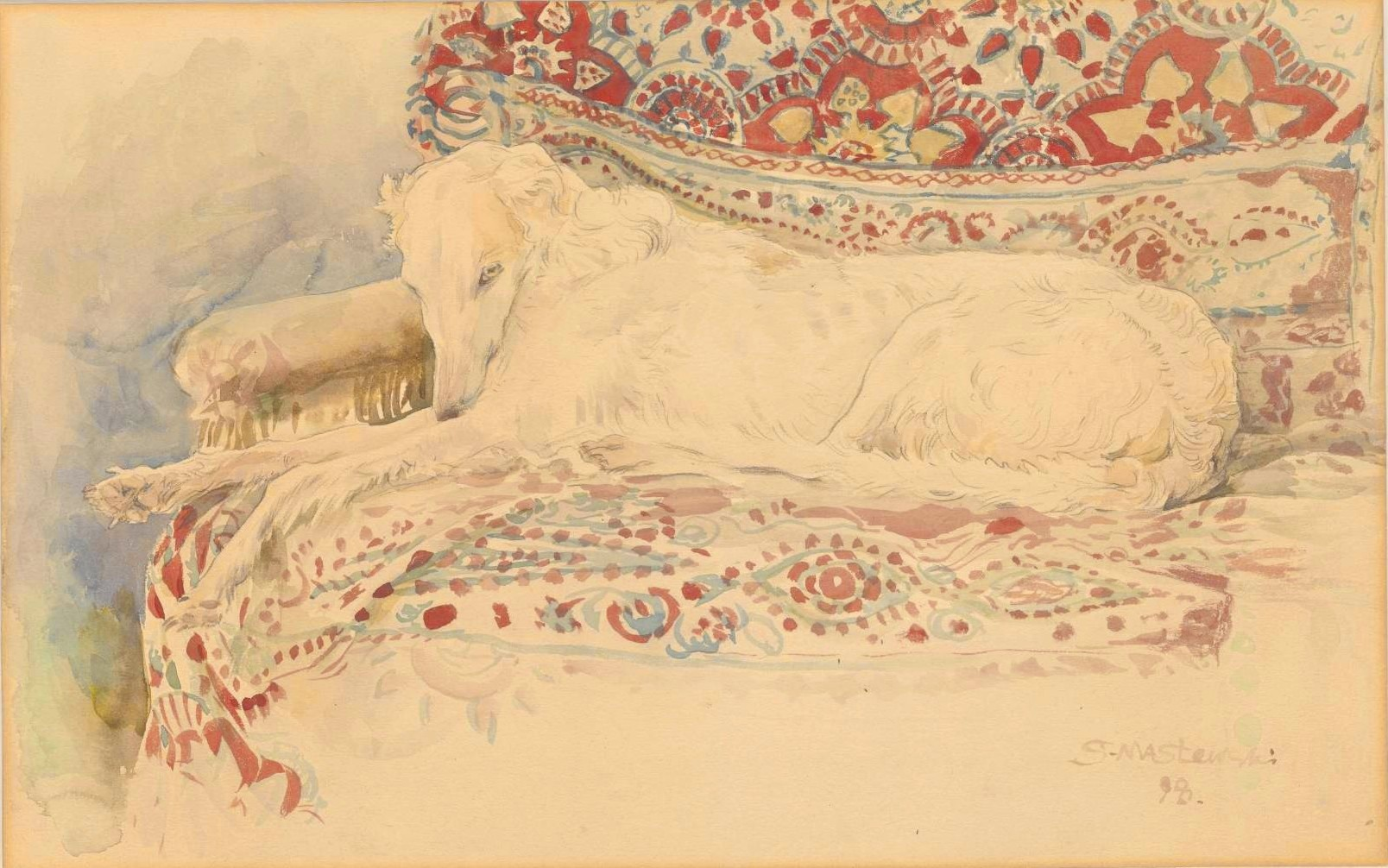
Chart (Greyhound), watercolor, 1898 (National Museum in Warsaw)

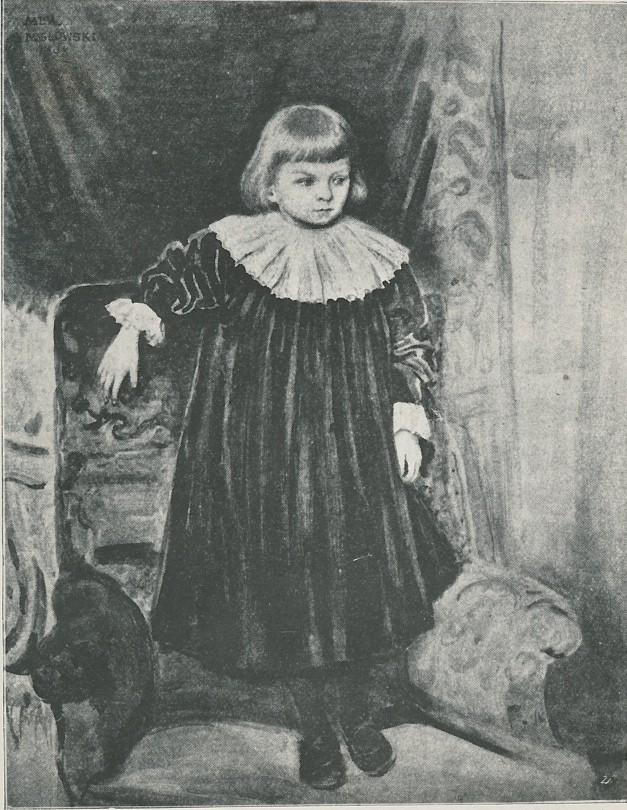
Portrait of a girl, watercolor/on parchment, 1898

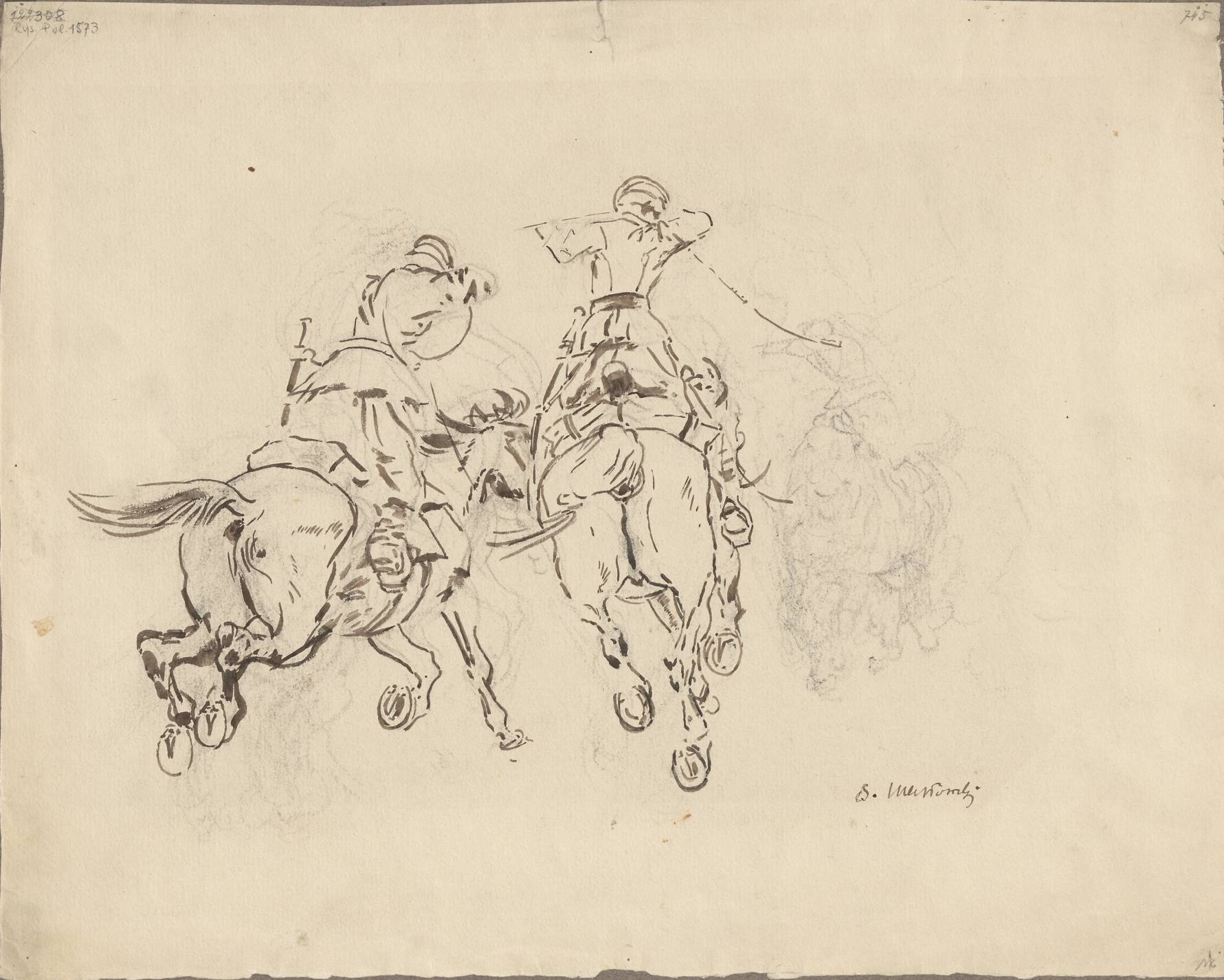
Kozacy na koniach w galopie (Cossacks Gallop Riding), draw., ca 1900 (National Museum in Warsaw)

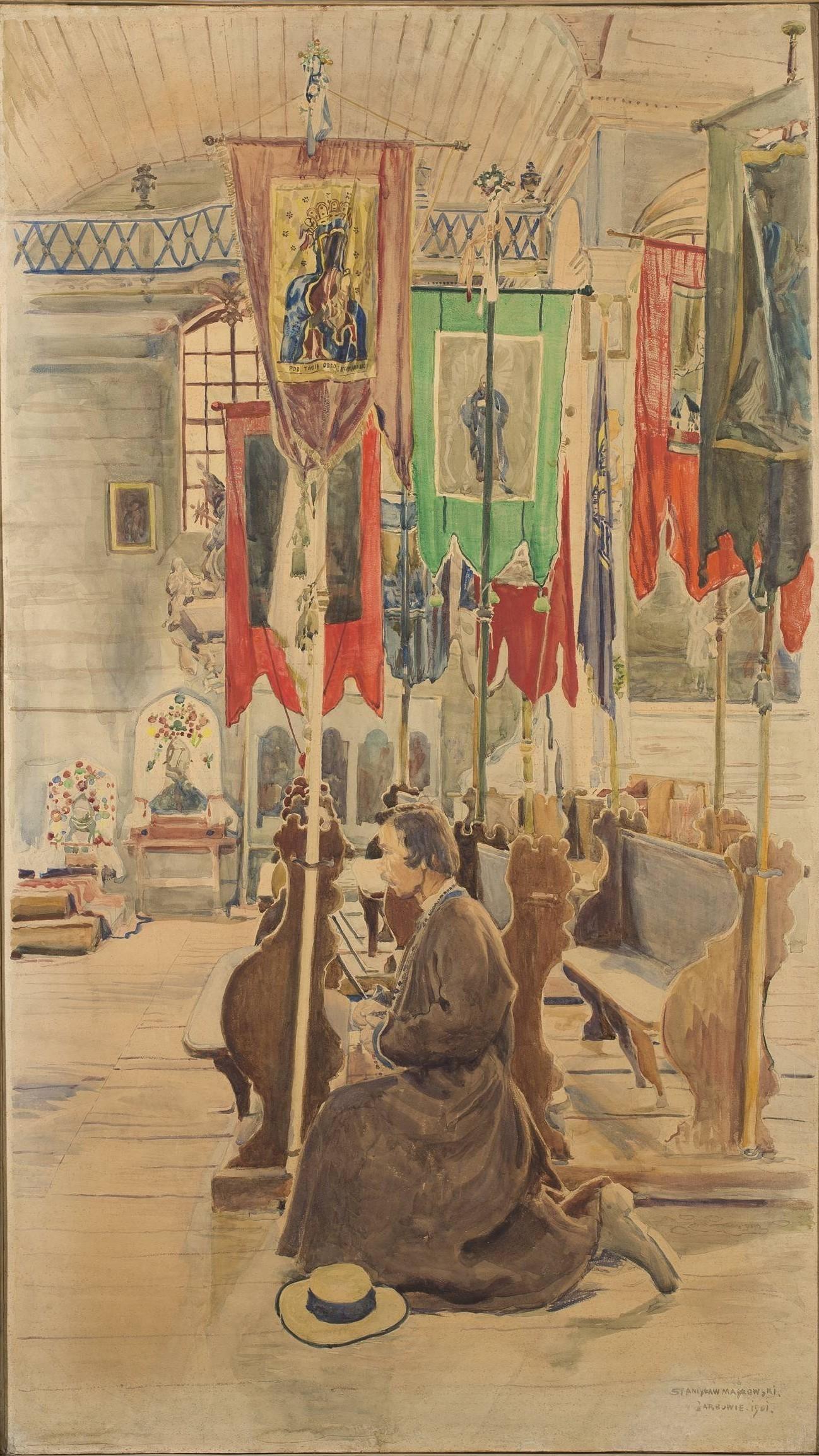
Wnętrze kościoła w Garbowie (Interior of the Church in Garbow), watercolour, 1901 (National Museum in Warsaw)

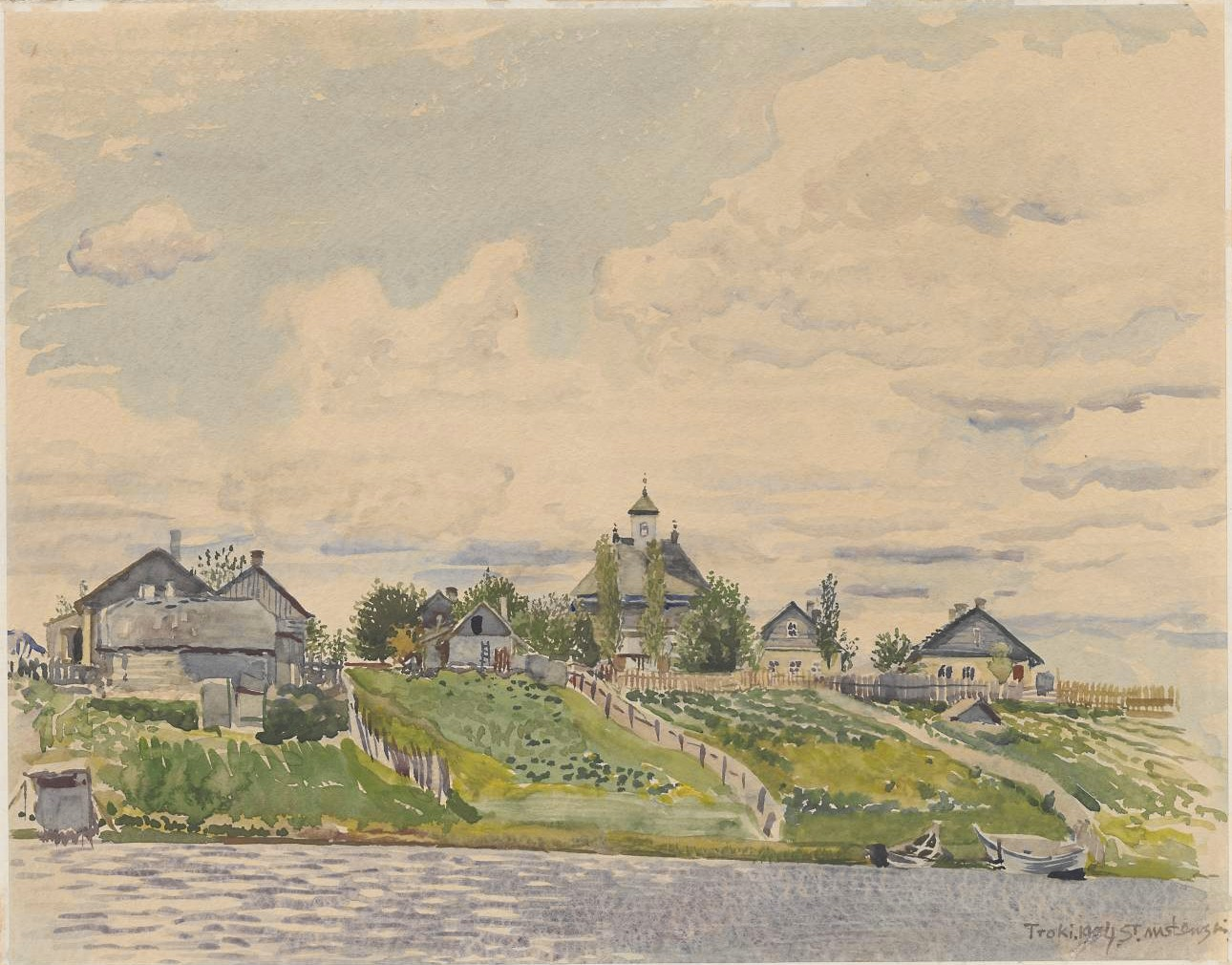
Troki - pejzaż ([Landscape of Trakai), watercolor, 1904 (National Museum in Warsaw)

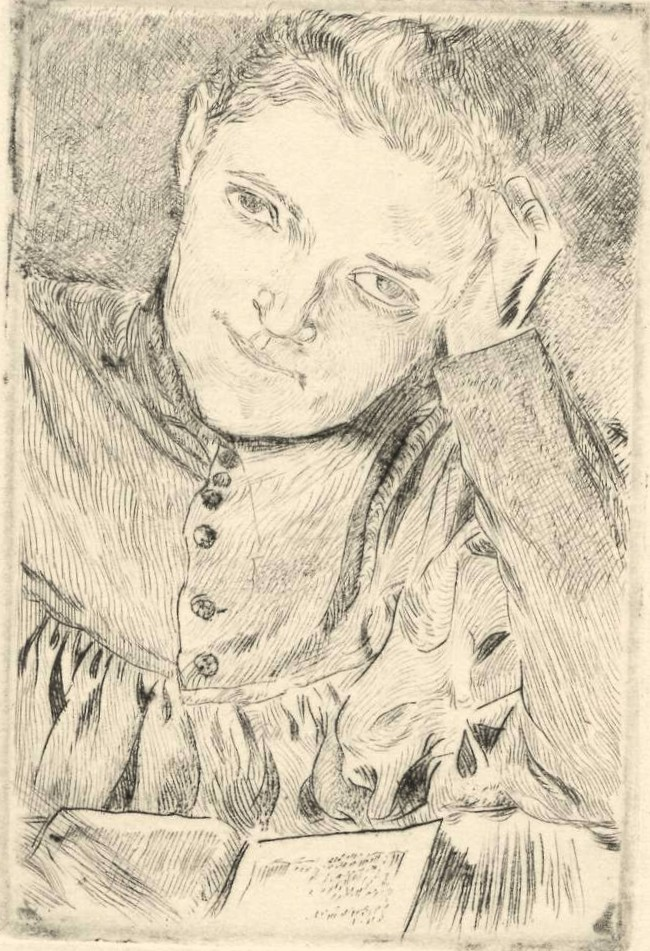
Portrait of Artist's Wife, drypoint, ca. 1905 (National Museum in Warsaw)

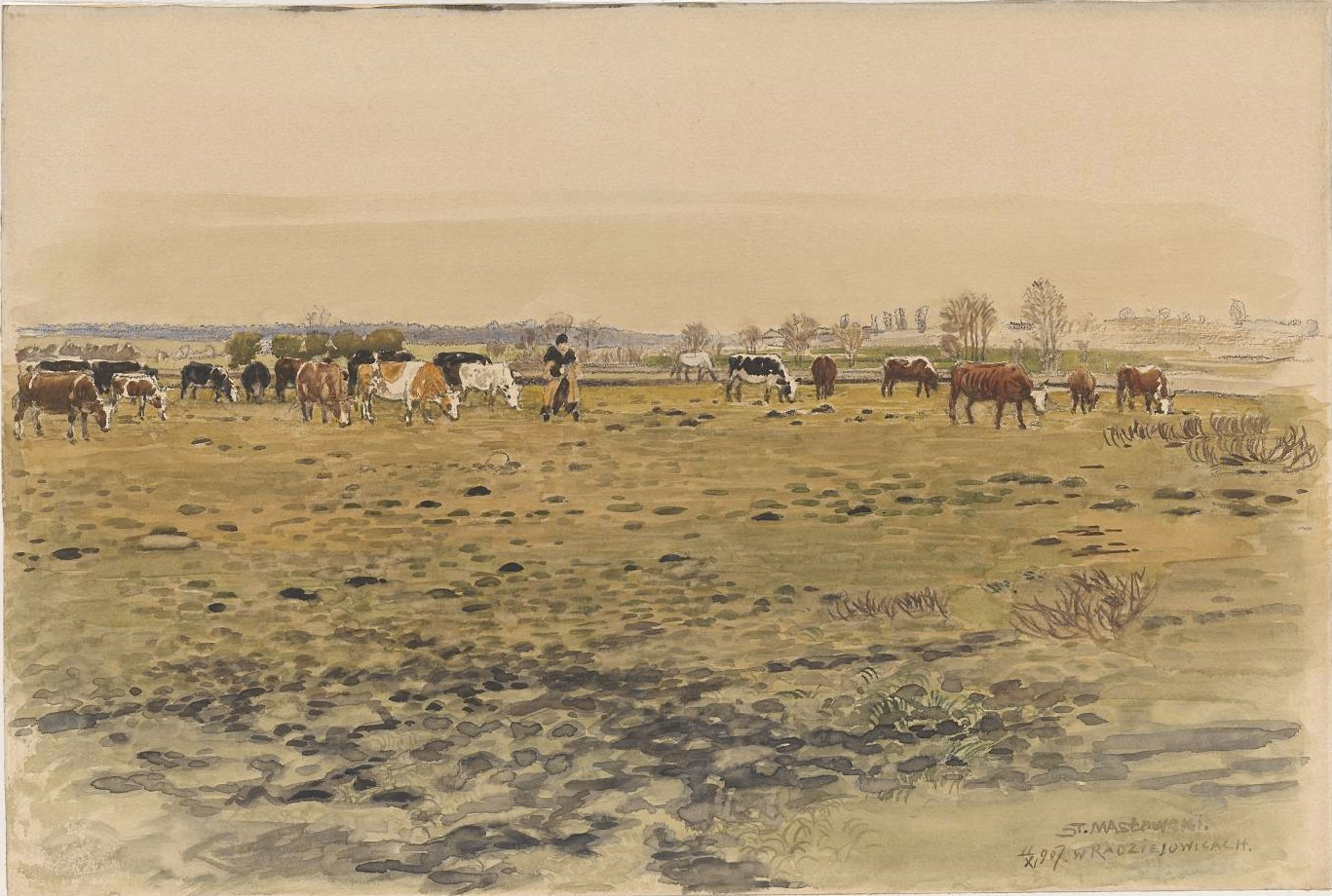
Pasture, autumn pasture landscape in Radziejowice, watercolor, 1907, (National Museum in Warsaw)

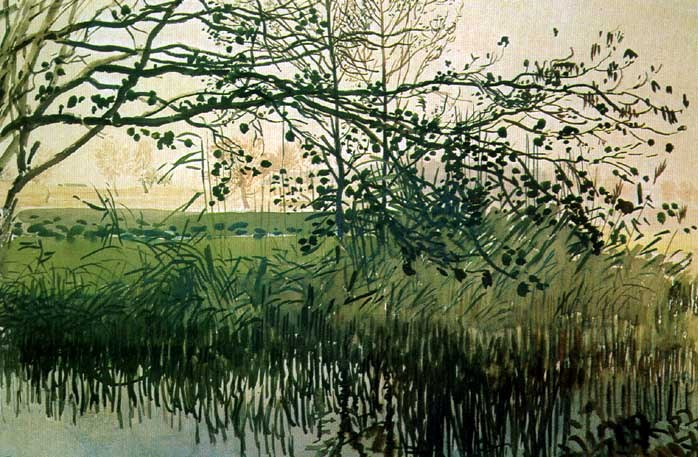
Staw w Radziejowicach (Pond in Radziejowice, 1907)

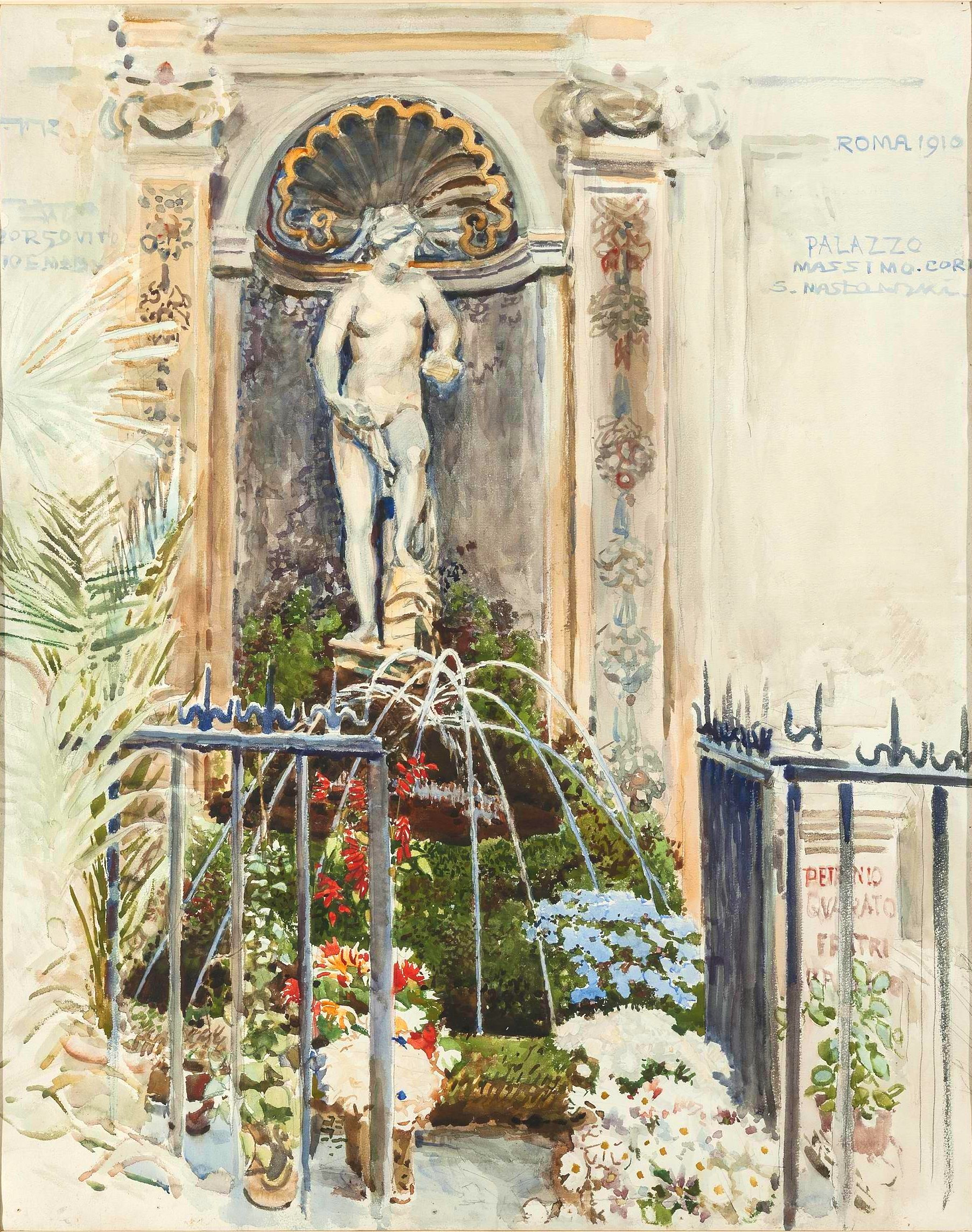
Fontanna w Palazzo Massimo (Fountain at Palazzo Massimo in Rome), watercolor, ca 1910 (National Museum in Warsaw)

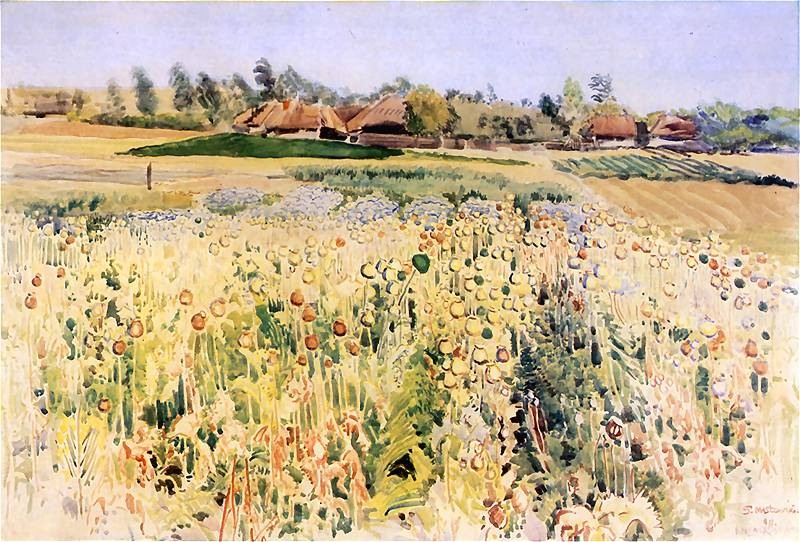
Maki, 1911 (The Field of Corn Poppies, watercolor, 1911, National Museum in Warsaw)

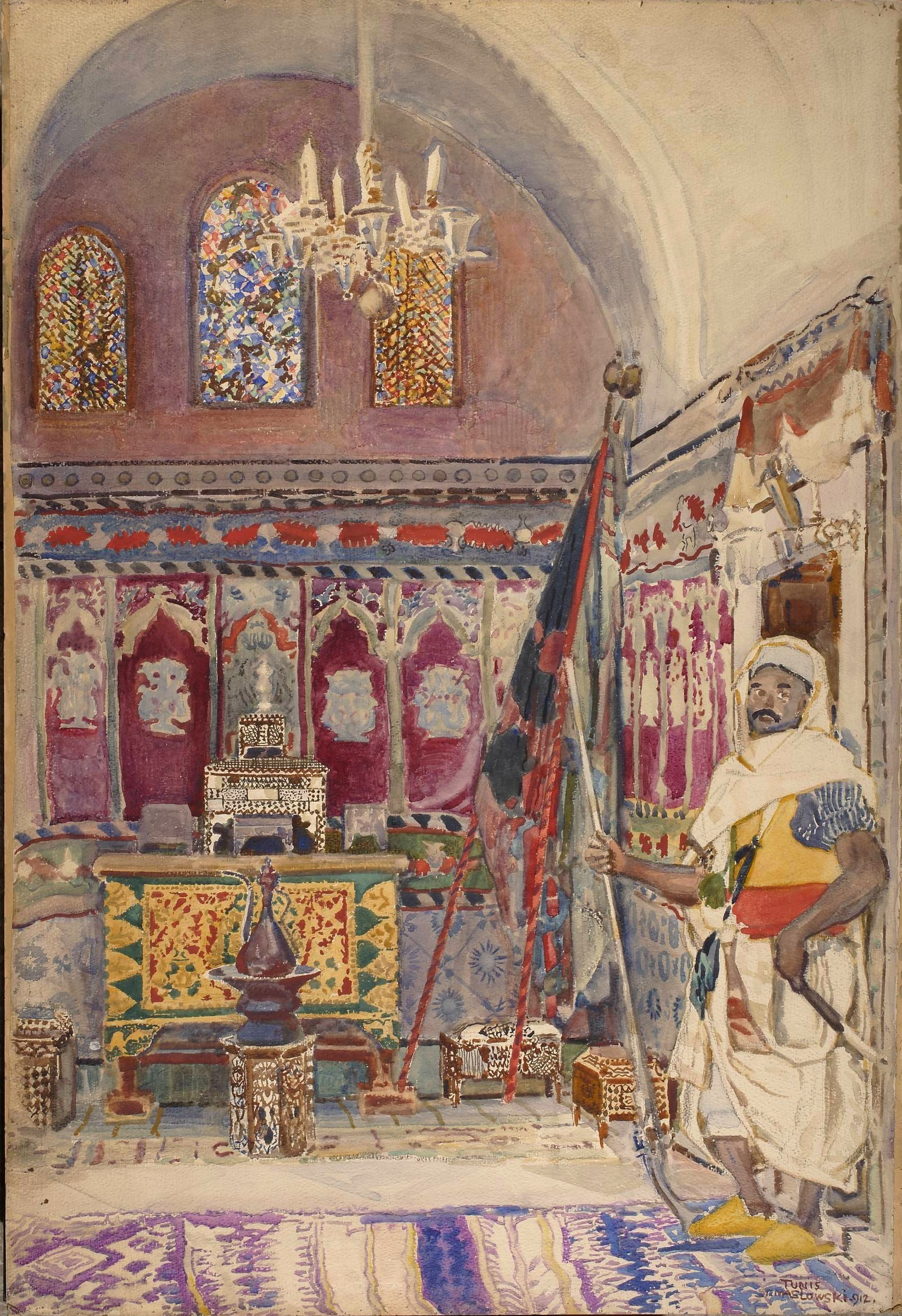
Skarbiec beja Tunisu w Dar el-Bei (Treasury - Bey of Tunis), watercolour on paper, 1912 (National Museum in Warsaw)

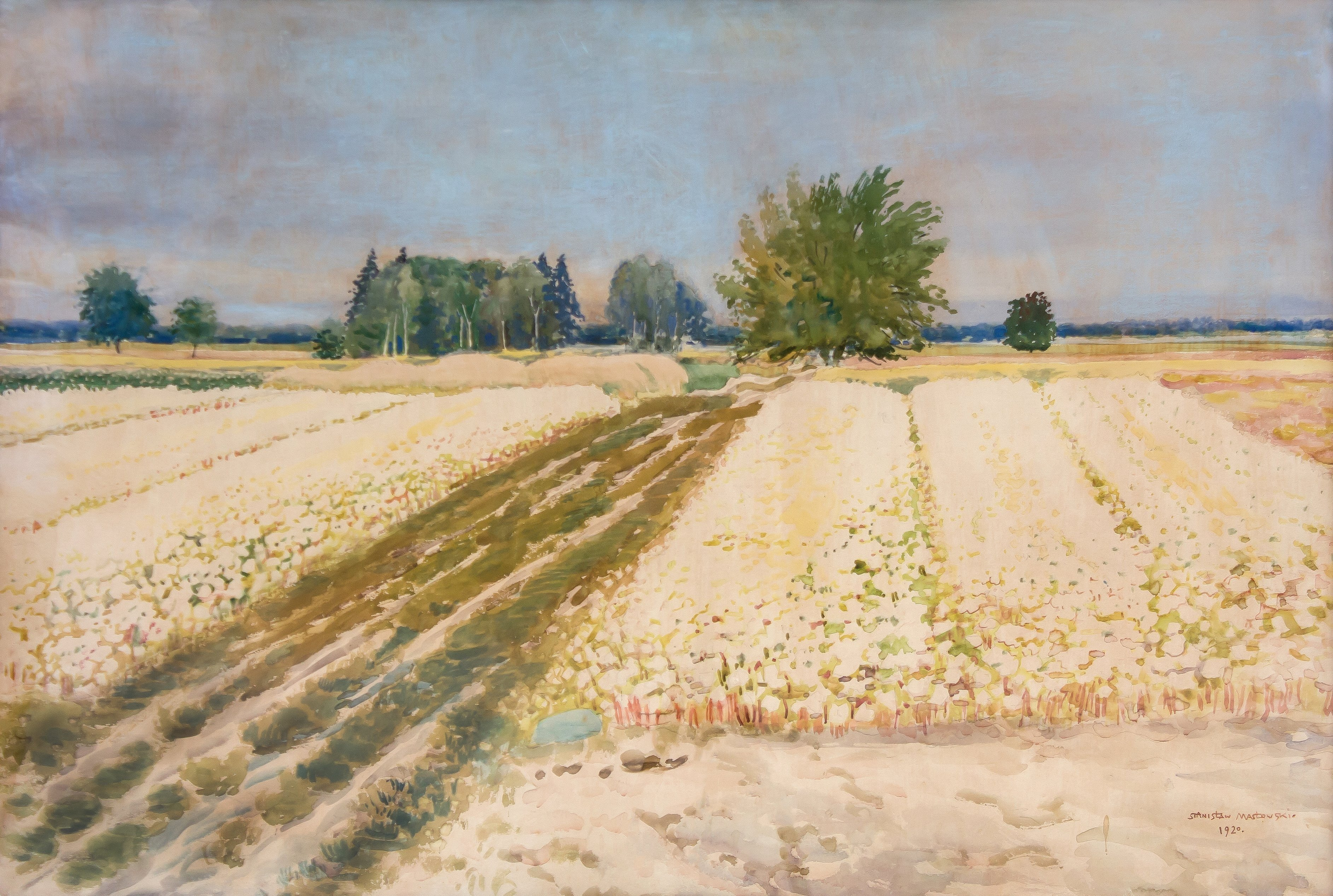
Gryka (Buckwheat Field Landscape), watercolour, 1920, Collection of Muzeum Okręgowe w Rzeszowie (Regional Museum in Rzeszów, Poland), phot. Grzegorz Stec.

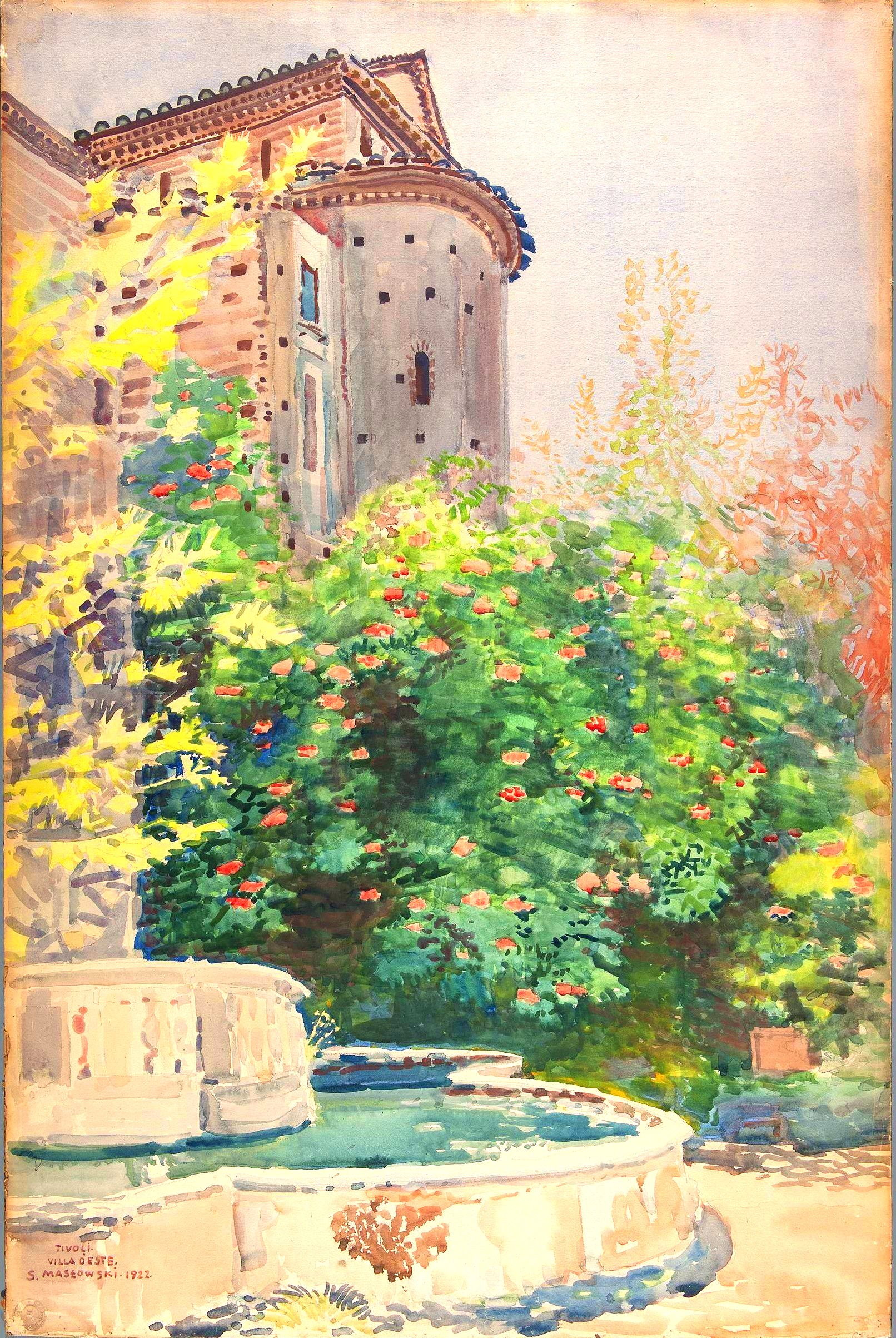
Tivoli, Villa d'Este, watercolour, 1922, (fragment), (National Museum in Warsaw)

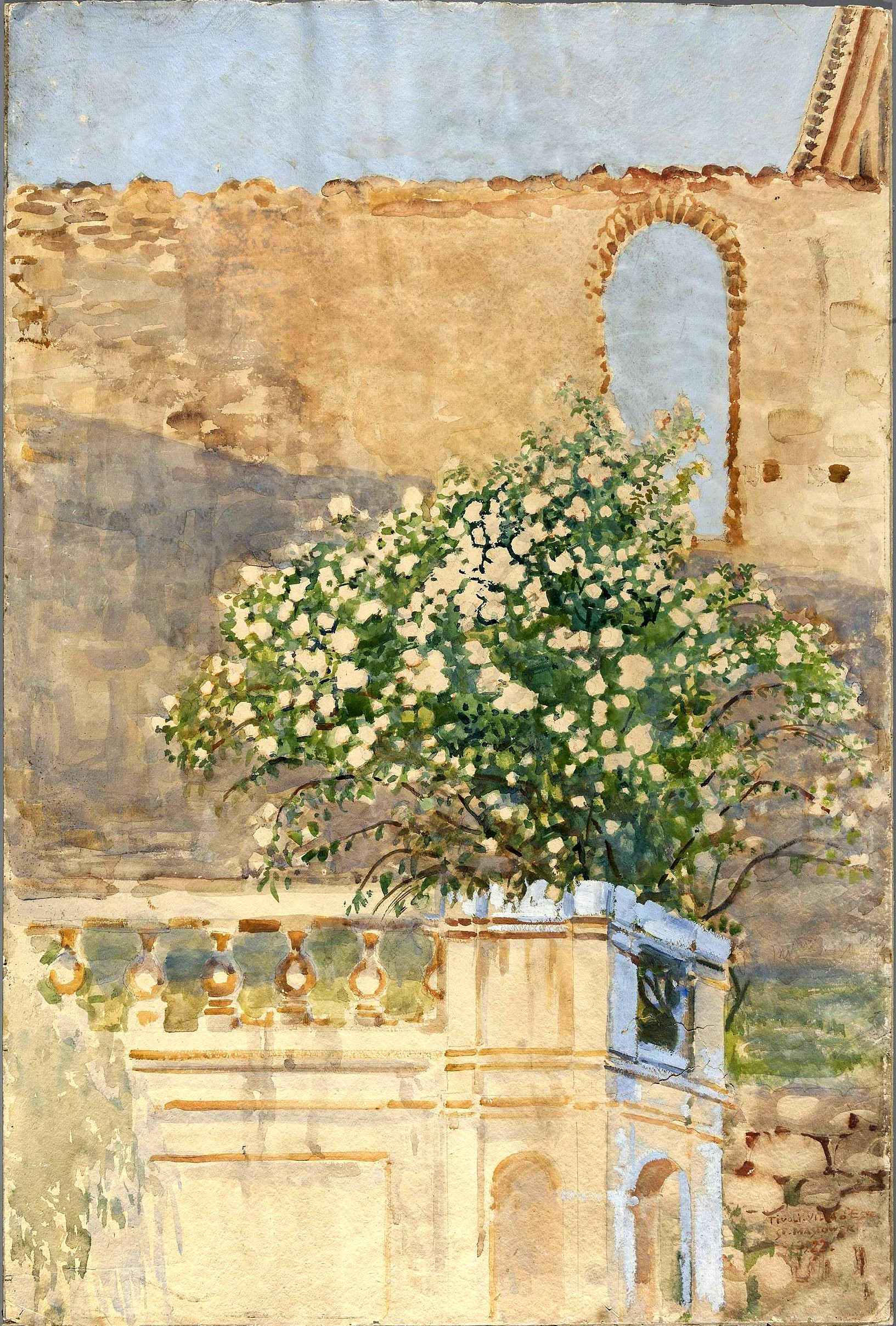
Blossoming Tree near Villa d'Este, watercolour, 1922, (National Museum in Warsaw), phot. Zbigniew Doliński

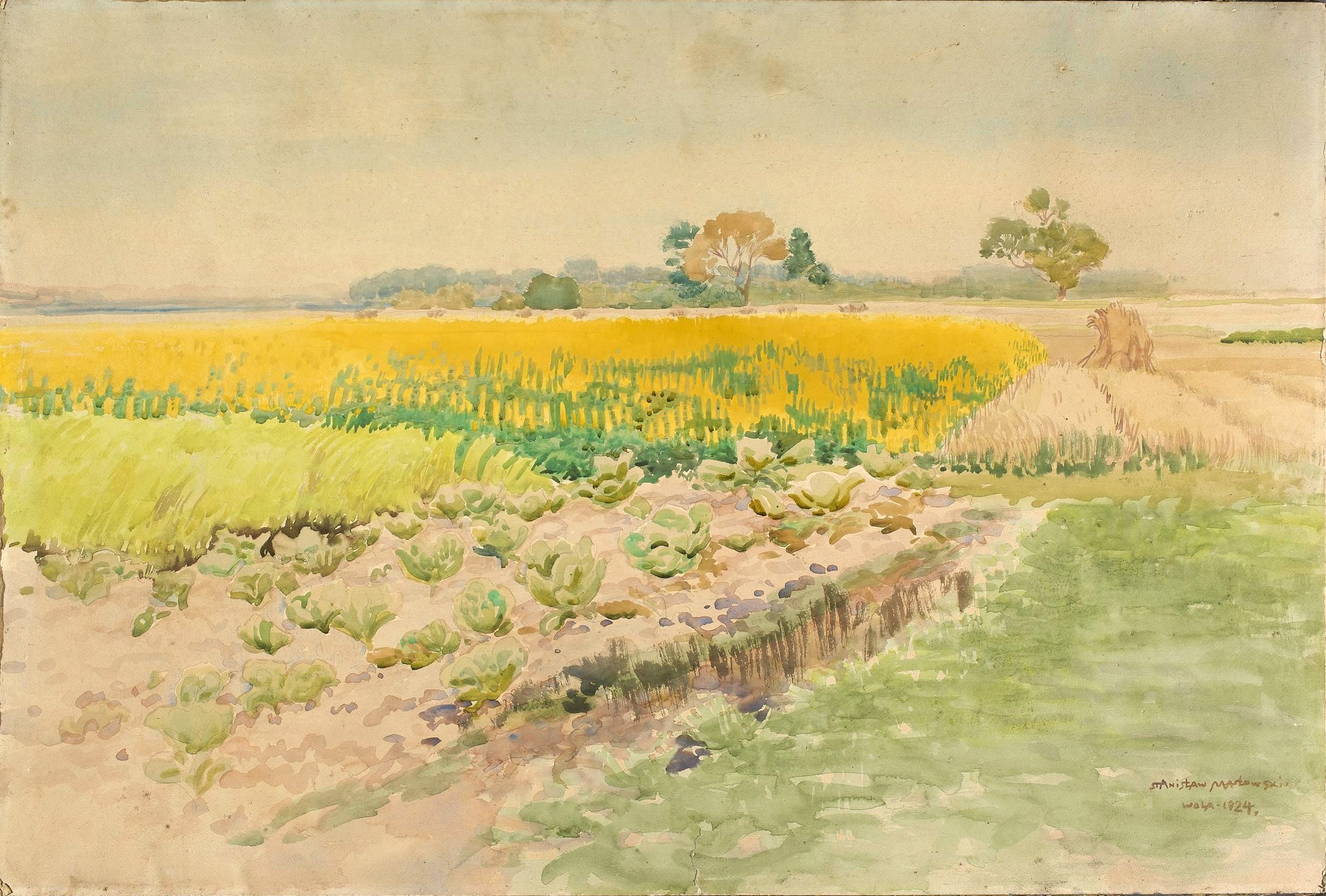
Łubin (Lupin Field), watercolor, 1924, landscape of Wola Rafałowska, (National Museum in Warsaw)

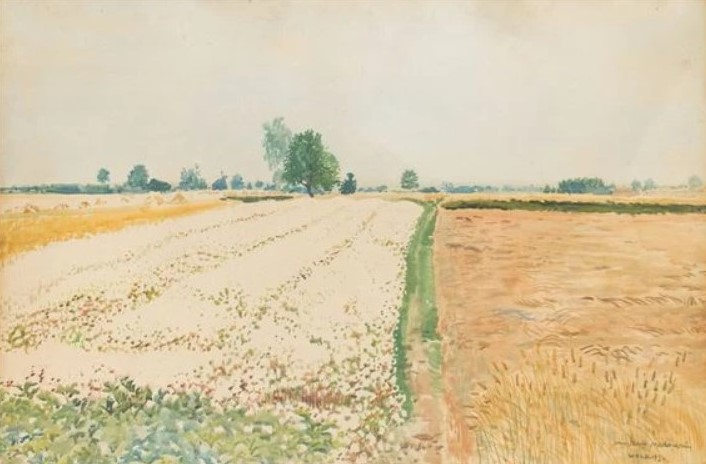
Gryka (Buckwheat Field Landscape), watercolour, 1924, Collection of National Museum in Warsaw

== Bibliography ==
- Archives Stanisław Masłowski family.
- Artists of the World, A Bio-Bibliographical Index AZ, Vol. 4, Saur, 2000.
- Bielecki R.: Szwoleżerowie gwardii (Guard Cavalrymen), series: "Słynne Pułki Polskie" [Famous Polish Regiments], ed. "Neriton", Warsaw 1996, p. 240 (entry No 2259).
- "Biesiada Literacka" (Literary Feast, weekly magazine), 1896, p. 279–282.
- Broniewski K.: Pogadanka artystyczna [Talk About Art], "Biblioteka Warszawska", 1902, vol.3, p. 376.
- "Centropa, A Journal of Central European Architecture and Related Arts", Vol. 8, Centropa, 2008, p. 74.
- Cękalska-Zborowska H.: Wieś w malarstwie i rysunku naszych artystów (Countryside in Painting and Drawing of our Artists), Warsaw 1969, p. 263–285.
- Dobrowolski T.: Nowoczesne malarstwo polskie (Modern Polish Painting), Wrocław 1960, p. 267–275.
- Dobrowolski T.: Sztuka Młodej Polski (Art of "Młoda Polska" Period), Warsaw 1963 (wyd. PWN).
- Dobrowolski T.: Sztuka polska (Polish Art), Kraków, 1974, ed. Wydawnictwo Literackie.
- Gerson W.: Wystawa TZSP, "Tygodnik Illustrowany" (Illustrated Weekly Magazine), 1888, vol. 1, p. 410.
- Gerson W.: Malarstwo, "Tygodnik Illustrowany" (Illustrated Weekly Magazine), 1885, vol. 1, p. 86.
- Grajewski L.: Bibliografia ilustracji w czasopismach polskich XIX i pocz. XX w. (do 1918 r.) [Bibliography of Illustrations in Polish Periodicals of the 19th and Beginning of the 20th century], ed. Państwowe Wydawnictwo Naukowe (PWN), 1972.
- Jabłczyński F.: S. Masłowski, "Tygodnik Illustrowany" [Illustrated Weekly Magazine], 1902, vol. 1.
- Jankowski J.: Wstęp do reprodukcji obrazu Masłowskiego "Spór o granicę" [Introduction to reproduction of S.Masłowski painting "Border Dispute"], Album sztuki polskiej i obcej [The Album of Polish and Foreign Art], Warsaw 1907–1910 (ed. S. Orgelbrand).
- Jaroszyński T.: Słowo wstępne do reprodukcji obrazu Masłowskiego "Rynek w Kazimierzu" (Foreword to Reproduction of Masłowski's Painting "Market Square in Kazimierz), "Album malarstwa polskiego" [The Album of Polish Art], 1902 (ed. M. Arct).
- Jasieński F.: Wstęp do reprodukcji obrazu Masłowskiego "Lasek" (Introduction to Reproduction of S. Masłowski Painting "Grove"), "Album sztuki polskiej", [The Album of Polish Art], Lwów 1903.
- Jensen J. Ch.: Polnische Malerei von 1830 bis 1914 [Polish Painting From 1830 to 1914], ed. Württembergischer Kunstverein, 1978.
- Karpowicz M., Chrościcki J. A.: Sztuka Warszawy [The Art of Warsaw], Warsaw 1986 (ed. PWN).
- Katalog wystaw zbiorowych Masłowskiego w r. 1896 w Salonie Krywulta i w r. 1925 w "Zachęcie" (Catalogue of the Collective Masłowski's Exhibitions in 1896 in Krywult Exhibition Room, and in 1925 in Zachęta).
- Kępiński Z.: Impresjonizm polski [Polish Impressionism], Warsaw 1961 ed. Arkady).
- Komza M.: Mickiewicz ilustrowany (Mickiewicz Illustrated), Wrocław 1987 (ed. "Ossolineum"), p. 264.
- Kopera F.: Dzieje malarstwa w Polsce [History of Painting in Poland]. Part 3, Malarstwo w Polsce 19. i 20. wieku [Painting in Poland in the 19th and 20th Centuries], Kraków 1929.
- von Kritter U., Zelinsky B.: Slawische Buchillustration im 20. Jahrhundert: Russland, Polen, Tschechien, Slowakei, Literarische Bilderwelten des 20. Jahrhunderts (Slavic Book Illustrations in the 20th century), Vol. 6, Böhlau, 1998, p. 100.
- Kühn A.: Die polnische Kunst von 1800 bis zur Gegenwart: Mit 150 Abbildungen (Polish Art From 1800 to Contemporary Times), ed. Klinkhardt & Biermann, 1930, p. 44.
- Łoza S.: Legia honorowa w Polsce 1803–1923 (French Order of Legion of Honour in Poland 1803–1923), Zamość 1923, ed. Zygmunt Pomarański i Spółka (reprint Warsaw 1986, ed. WAiF (Art and Film Publishers), p. 38, Entry No 284.
- Masłowski M. [coll.]: Stanisław Masłowski – Materiały do życiorysu i twórczości (Stanisław Masłowski – Materials for the Biography and Works), Wrocław 1957.
- Mickiewicz A.: Pan Tadeusz, Łódź [1906], publ. and printed by "Rozwój" [6 reproduced S. Masłowski's illustrations for "Pan Tadeusz" poem].
- Mitarski W.: Z wystaw warszawskich, salony prywatne [The Exhibitions in Warsaw, Private Lounges], "Tygodnik Illustrowany" [Illustrated Weekly ], 1922, p. 820–821.
- Niewiadomski E.: Ze sztuki [From the Art], "Kurier Warszawski", 1902.
- Niewiadomski E.: Malarstwo polskie XIX i XX wieku [Polish Painting of the 19th and 20th Centuries], Warsaw 1926.
- Piątkowski H.: Stanisław Masłowski – sylweta artysty [Silhouette of Artist], "Tygodnik Illustrowany", 1909, No 47.
- Piątkowski H.: Wystawa Stanisława Masłowskiego [Masłowski Exhibition], "Tygodnik Illustrowany" [Illustrated Weekly Magazine], 1910, vol. 2, p. 969.
- Piątkowski H.: Kronika malarska – Obrazy S. Masłowskiego w Salonie Kulikowskiego (Chronicle of art – Masłowski Paintings in Kulikowski Exhibition Room), "Tygodnik Illustrowany" [Illustrated Weekly Magazine], 1907, vol. 1, p. 331–332.
- Piotrowska I.: The Art of Poland, Philosophical Library Publishers, New York, 1947.
- Polnische Maler des 19. und 20. Jahrhunderts – Ausstellung (Polish Painters of 19th and 20th Century – Exhibition) Berlin 1949;
- Polski słownik biograficzny (Polish Biographical Dictionary), Wrocław-Warsaw-Kraków-Gdańsk 1975 (ed. Polska Akad. Nauk – Zakład Narodowy im. Ossolińskich), vol. XX/1, p. 129 (entry: "Stanisław Masłowski").
- Register of Baptismal Certificates, Parish of Pauline Fathers, Włodawa.
- Rutkowski S.: Stanisław Masłowski (1853–1926), "Sztuki Piękne" ["Fine Arts" Magazine], 1926, No 10–11.
- Ryszkiewicz A.: Malarstwo polskie – romantyzm, historyzm – realizm (Polish Painting – Romanticism – Historicism – Realism), Warsaw 1989 (ed. "Auriga").
- Sienkiewicz J., Derwojed J.: Rysunek polski – od Oświecenia do Młodej Polski [Polish Drawing Art – from the Age of Enlightenment to the "Young Poland" period], Warsaw 1970 (ed. "Arkady" Publ.).
- Skimborowicz H., Gerson W.: Album widoków i pamiątek [Album of Views and Souvenirs], Warsaw 1977.
- Słownik artystów polskich i obcych w Polsce działających (zmarłych przed 1966), Malarze, rzeźbiarze, graficy, Instytut Sztuki PAN (Dictionary of Polish and Foreign Artists Working in Poland (who died before 1966), Painters, Sculptors, Graphic Artists, The Institute of Fine Arts, Polish Academy of Sciences), vol. V (Le-M), ed. "Krąg", Warsaw 1993.
- Stanisław Masłowski – Akwarele, 12 reprodukcji barwnych (teka ze wstępem M. Masłowskiego), Warsaw 1956 (ed. "Sztuka") (Watercolours – 12 colour reproductions of Stanisław Masłowski paintings – portfolio with an introduction by M. Masłowski).
- Starzyński J.: Pięć wieków malarstwa polskiego [Five Centuries of Polish Painting], Warsaw 1952 (ed. Państwowy Instytut Wydawniczy).
- Struve H.: Przegląd Artystyczny (Art Review), "Kłosy" Magazine, 1881, vol. 31, p. 118.
- "The Studio. An Illustrated Magazine of Fine and Applied Art", Studio Trust, 1927, Vol. 94, p. 292.
- Teatr, Muzyka, Sztuki plastyczne (Theatre, Music, Visual Arts), "Tygodnik Illustrowany" [Illustrated Weekly Magazine], 1904, vol.2, p. 826.
- Trzebiński M.: Pamiętnik malarza (The Diary of a Painter), Wrocław 1958.
- Wankie W.: Nasi artyści (Our Artists), "Świat" ["World" Magazine], 1907, II, p. 3.
- Wiercińska J.: Katalog prac wystawionych w Towarzystwie Zachęty Sztuk Pięknych w Warszawie w latach 1860–1914 (Catalogue of Works Exhibited in the Society for the Encouragement of Fine Arts in Warsaw in 1860–1914), Wrocław-Warsaw-Kraków 1969, Ossolineum Publ.
- Wiercińska J.: Towarzystwo Zachęty Sztuk Pięknych w Warszawie (The Society for the Encouragement of Fine Arts in Warsaw), Wrocław-Warsaw-Kraków 1968, Ossolineum Publ.
- Wolff J.: Kształt piękna [The Shape of Beauty], Warsaw 1973.
- Wystawa TZSP w Warszawie (Exhibition Society for the Encouragement of Fine Arts in Warsaw), "Tygodnik Illustrowany" (Illustrated Weekly Magazine) 1876, vol.2, No 51, p. 394–395.
