= Frenzy of Exultations =

1893 painting by Władysław Podkowiński

Szał (Frenzy)
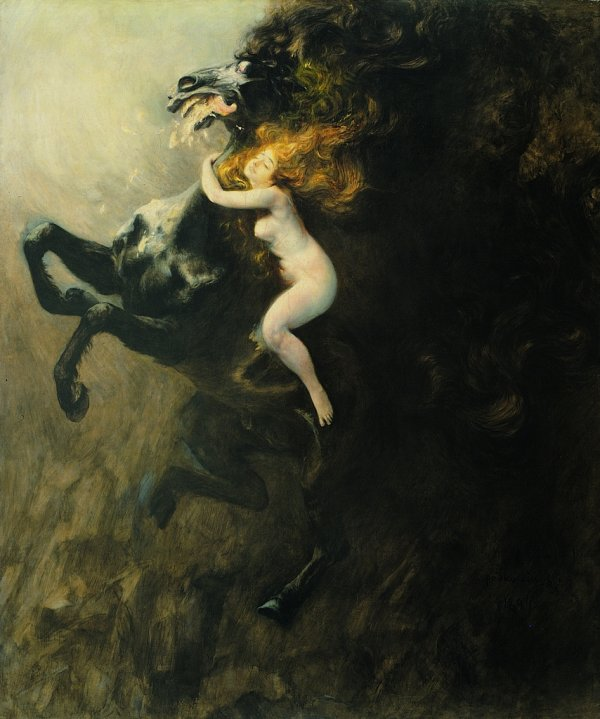
- Artist: Władysław Podkowiński
- Year: 1893
- Medium: Oil on canvas
- Dimensions: 310 cm × 270 cm (120 in × 110 in)
- Location: Sukiennice Museum, Kraków

Frenzy of Exultations (Polish: Szał uniesień), better known as Frenzy (Szał), is an 1893 painting by Polish artist Władysław Podkowiński and is credited as the most famous work in his output. It is considered the first work of Symbolism in Polish art, during a period when Poland was partitioned between its neighbours: Russia, Germany and Austria.

== Description ==
The painting shows a nude, redheaded woman riding a black, frenetic horse. The horse bares its teeth, its tongue hanging out. Its nostrils are dilated and foam runs from its mouth. The woman riding the horse tightly clasps its neck with her eyes closed, her loose hair fanning out and flowing upwards to mingle with the horse's mane.

The color range is quite narrow and is composed of blacks, browns and grays contrasting with the white and yellow. The image is divided into light and dark parts. The upper left corner is illuminated, directing attention to a clear figure of a woman and the horse's mouth. The right side of the painting shows whirled darkness in which the horse's hind and tail can be seen.

== Background ==
The concept of work dates back to Podkowiński's stay in Paris in 1889, but the emergence of successive oil sketches and charcoal studies in the second half of 1893 was the consequence of the growing drama of unrequited love in the artist's life. In his vision, Podkowiński elevates erotic ecstasy to an absolute value, regarding it, in accordance with the psychologism of that time, as the cosmic power and determinant of the human condition.

Setting about the execution of the huge painting, he employed the academic method of preparatory sketches corresponding to the final version, while differing slightly in size and colour. Reduced in colour scheme, they range from the ultramarine version (lost), through work enlivened with green, to subsequent ones in which intense orange predominates. The avalanche of stones was also removed from the final version.

In comparison with the sketches, the final, monumental composition gained in dynamism over the earlier weak contrast of colour, intensifying to between golden and black, and the tension between light and shadow became more polarised. This could be an effect of his private life drama and the progress of his lung disease.

== History ==
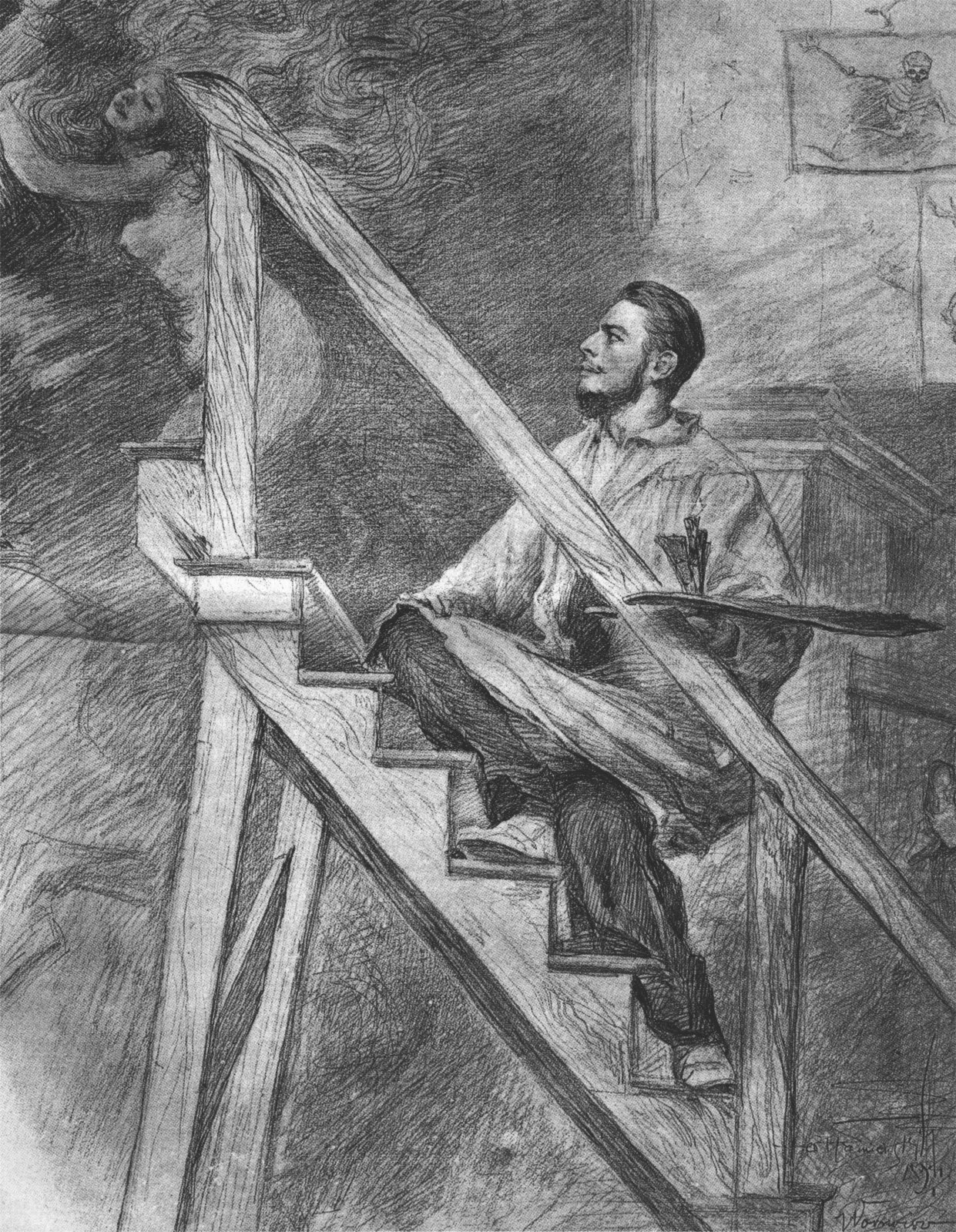
Władysław Podkowiński Painting "Frenzy" by Antoni Kamieński, 1895

Podkowiński started to paint in Warsaw between 1893 and 1894. The creation process lasted at least three months, and according to a friend, the terminally ill Podkowiński "was painting from his bed" as he finished the work. The painting was shown at the Zachęta exhibition on 18 March 1894. The exhibition was accompanied by an atmosphere of sensationalism and scandal; however, approximately 12,000 people saw the picture, earning nearly 350 rubles for the gallery.

Despite the success of the painting, Podkowiński could not find a willing buyer: 3000 rubles were offered, but Podkowiński had asked for 10,000.

On the morning of 23 April 1894, 36 days since the exhibition's opening and just before its planned end, Podkowiński came to the exhibition and slashed the painting with a knife. The reasons for this act are unclear.

Podkowiński's act of desecration may have contributed to the rumours that the image portrayed a woman towards which the artist had an unfulfilled affection. The damage of the image, and Podkowiński's death soon afterwards fuelled the speculation of his death being a suicide. Providing a rationale for this explanation are the traces of cuts on the canvas showing that only the image of the woman was subject to the attack. The object of the artist's feelings could be Ewa Kotarbińska, whom he met during his summer stay in a palace near Warsaw. She was a brunette, but Helena Kiniorska recorded in her memoir that her family saw a similarity between her and the woman in the painting and harshly condemned him.

After Podkowiński's death the painting was restored by Witold Urbański. The restored work was lent to other exhibitions in Łódź, Kraków, Moscow and Saint Petersburg. Finally, the canvas was purchased by Feliks Jasieński in 1901 for 1,000 rubles, and in 1904 was given to the National Museum in Kraków.

== See also ==
- 1893 in art
- Chiaroscuro
- Polish Impressionism
