= Antoni Kamieński =

Polish-Belarusian painter, illustrator and engraver

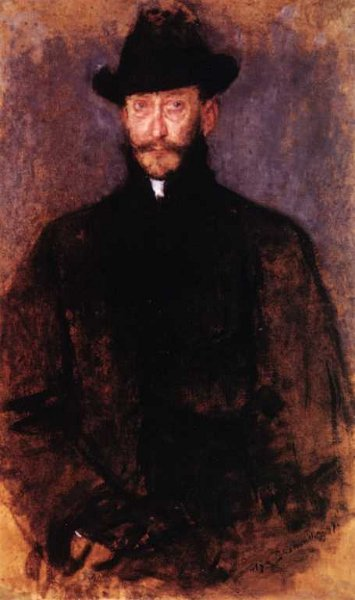
- Antoni Kamieński; portrait by Olga Boznańska (1899)
- Born: July 21, 1860; Yarilovka, Grodno Governorate
- Died: September 12, 1933 (aged 73); Warsaw
- Education: Petersburg Academy of Arts
- Occupations: Painter, illustrator, engraver

Antoni Kamieński (21 July 1860, Yarilovka, Grodno Governorate – 12 September 1933, Warsaw) was a Polish painter, illustrator and engraver.

== Biography ==
He was born to a land-owning family, but chose to disregard his father's wishes and left home to study at the Imperial Academy of Arts from 1882 to 1885. His primary instructor there was Bogdan Willewalde. In 1886, he had to interrupt his studies when his family fell into financial difficulties and return home to help save their estate. In 1890, he moved to Warsaw, where he found work as an illustrator for the magazine Tygodnik Illustrowany.

In 1891, he was able to go to Paris and study at the Académie Julian, where he learned sculpting from Antonin Mercié and painting with William-Adolphe Bouguereau. His illustrations appeared in Le Monde illustré and, occasionally, in The Graphic.

He returned to Warsaw in 1894 and continued to work as an illustrator for local magazines until 1912, although he made numerous trips to Paris to exhibit. At the outbreak of World War I he was there and, as a Russian citizen, was detained at the Austrian border when he attempted to get home. He ended up spending the war in Switzerland.

In 1919, when Poland became independent, he joined the Blue Army and became an enthusiastic supporter of the National Revival. He was one of the many artists who painted a portrait of Józef Piłsudski.

One of his best-known works is the album, "Sketches of Białowieża Forest" (1912). He also created a series of popular engravings inspired by the Revolution of 1905. In addition to his magazine illustrations, he created drawings for the fairy tales of Hans Christian Andersen, as well as works by Eliza Orzeszkowa and Maria Konopnicka, in a wide variety of media, including ink, charcoal and colored pencils. In 1907, he published his own novel, called Spring Morning.

By the time of his death, he was largely forgotten.

== Selected works ==
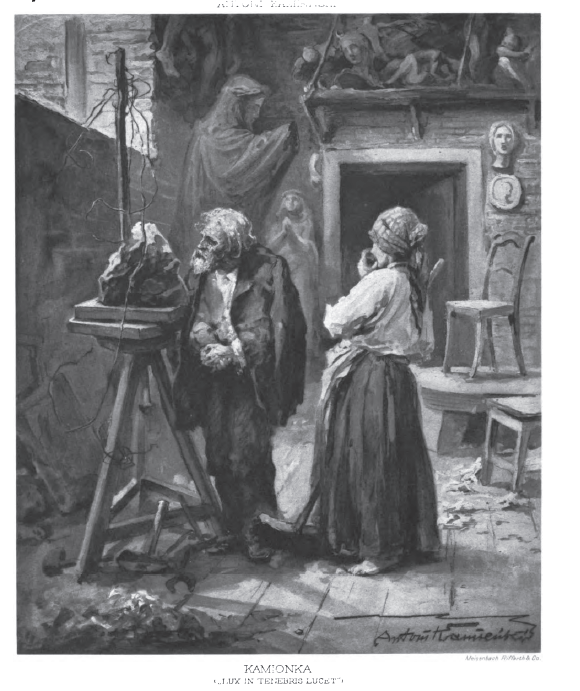
A scene from Hania
by Henryk Sienkiewicz

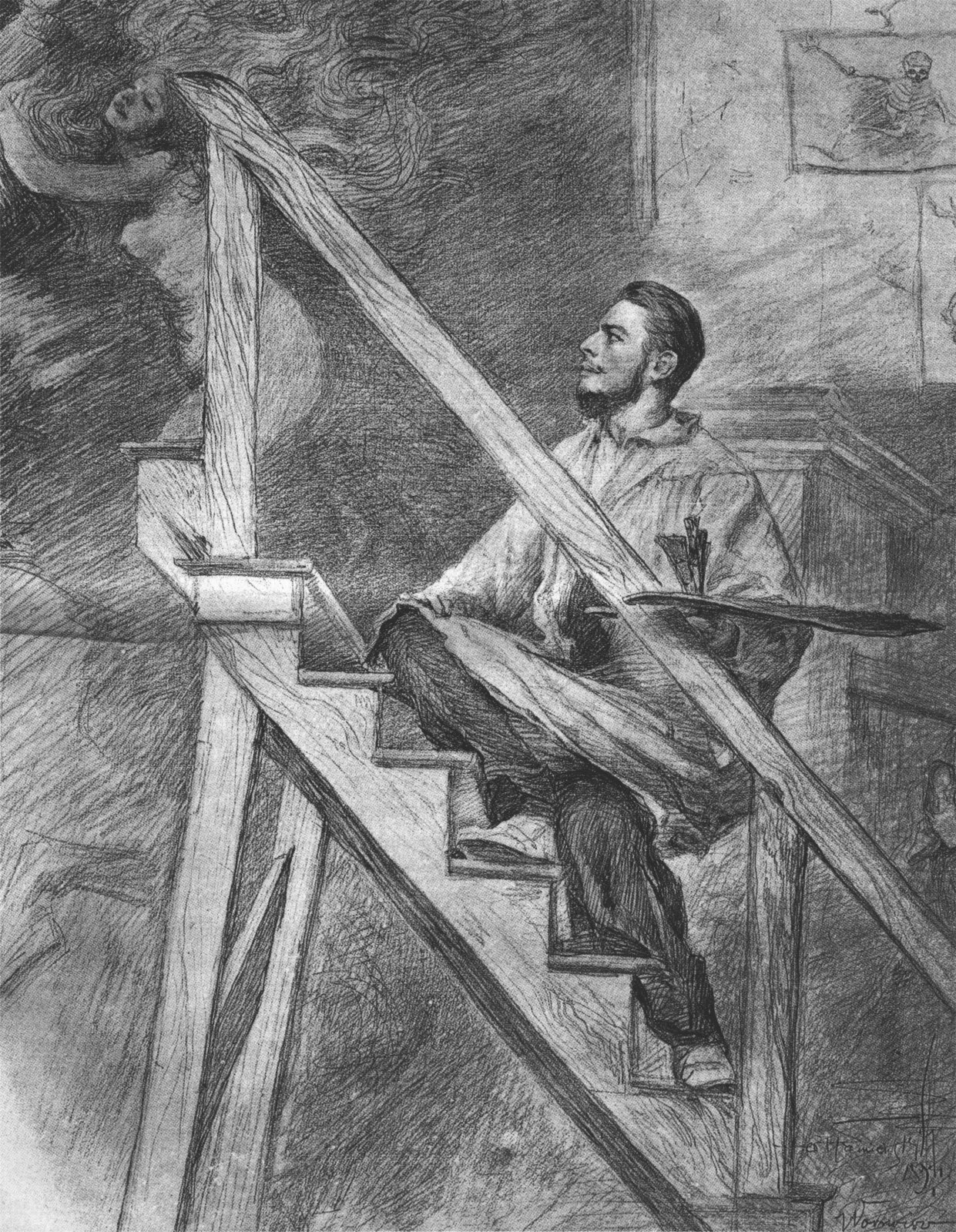
Władysław Podkowiński painting "Frenzy"

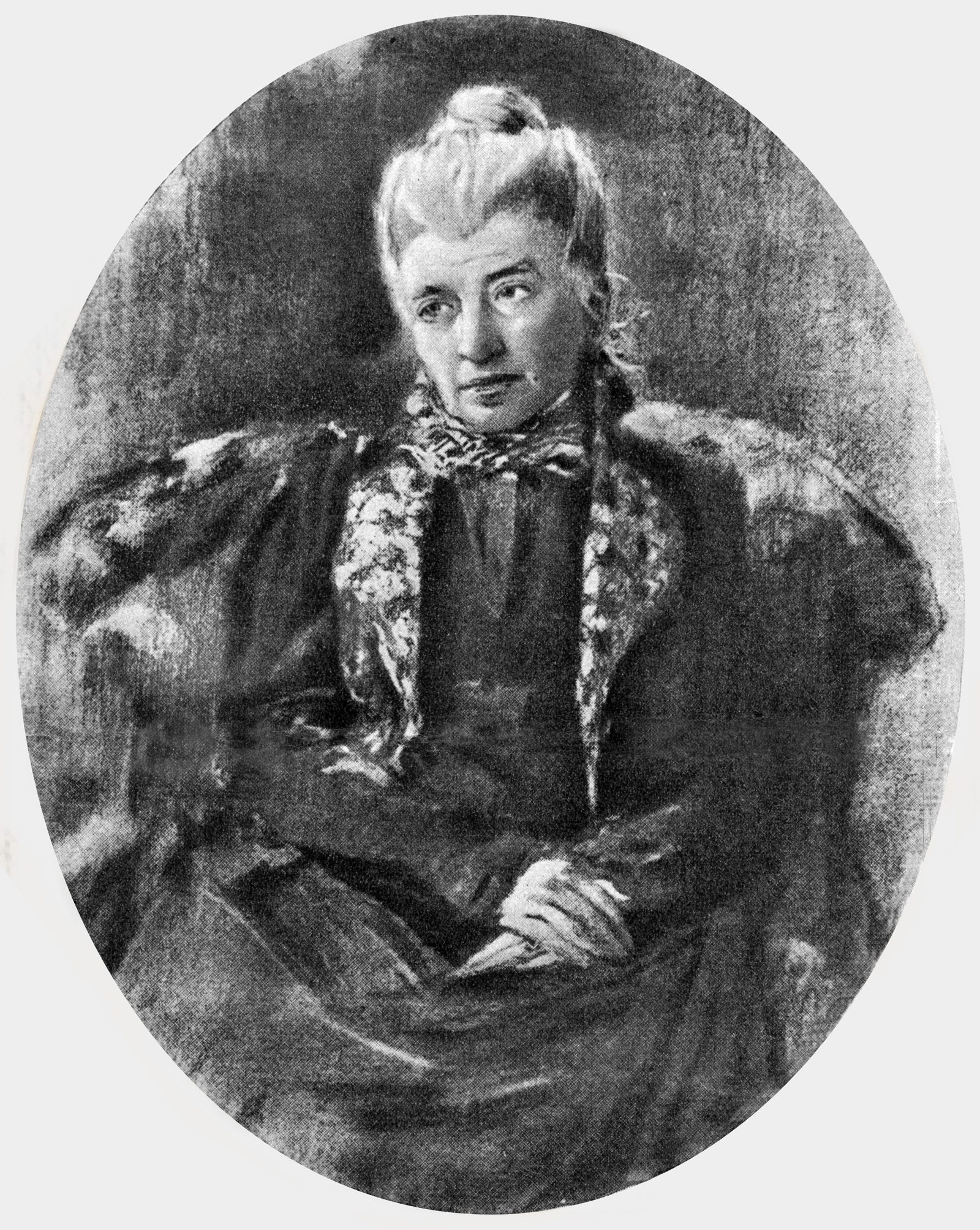
Eliza Orzeszkowa

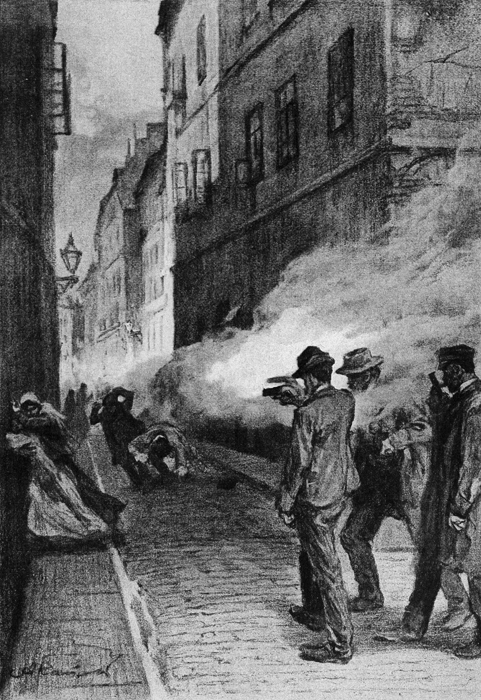
Brownings
