= Moonrise (Stanisław Masłowski) =

1884 painting by Stanisław Masłowski

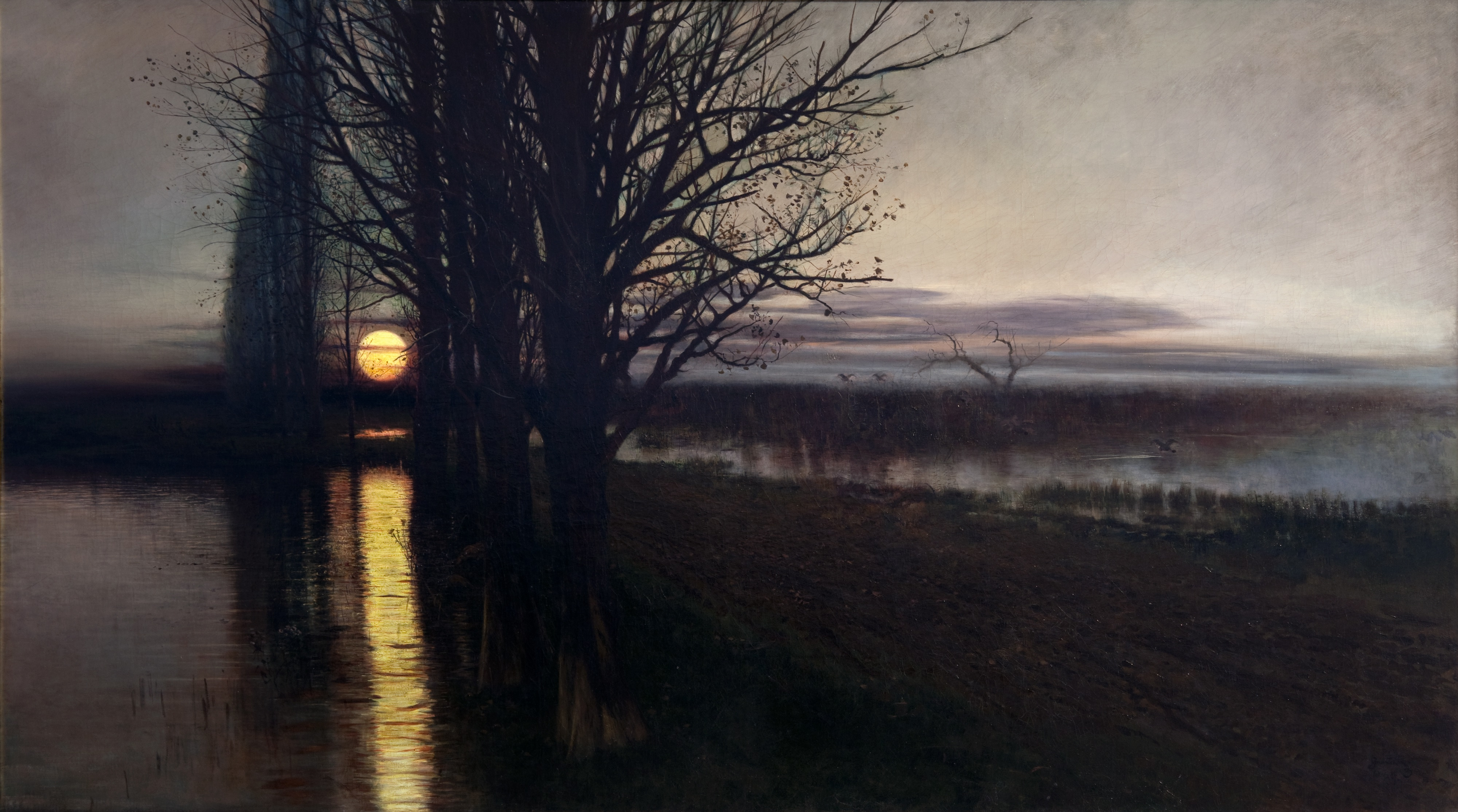
- Artist: Stanisław Masłowski (1853–1926)
- Year: 1884
- Medium: Oil on canvas
- Dimensions: 220 cm × 124 cm (87 in × 49 in)
- Location: National Museum, Kraków – Division: "Sukiennice Museum"; Kraków

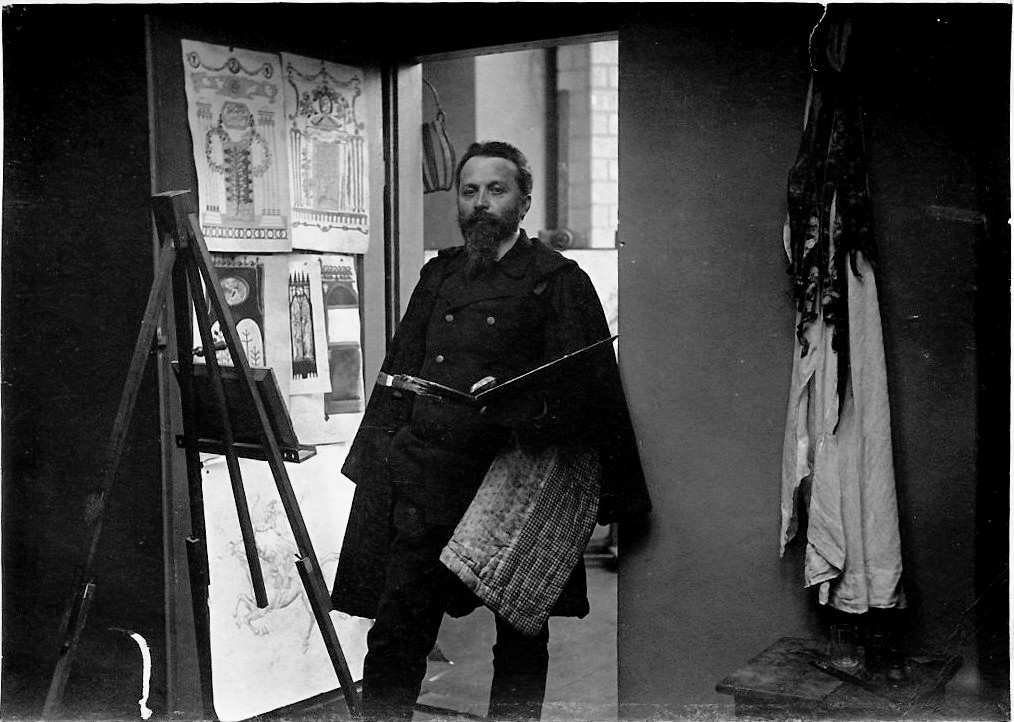
Stanisław Masłowski at his atelier, ca 1900

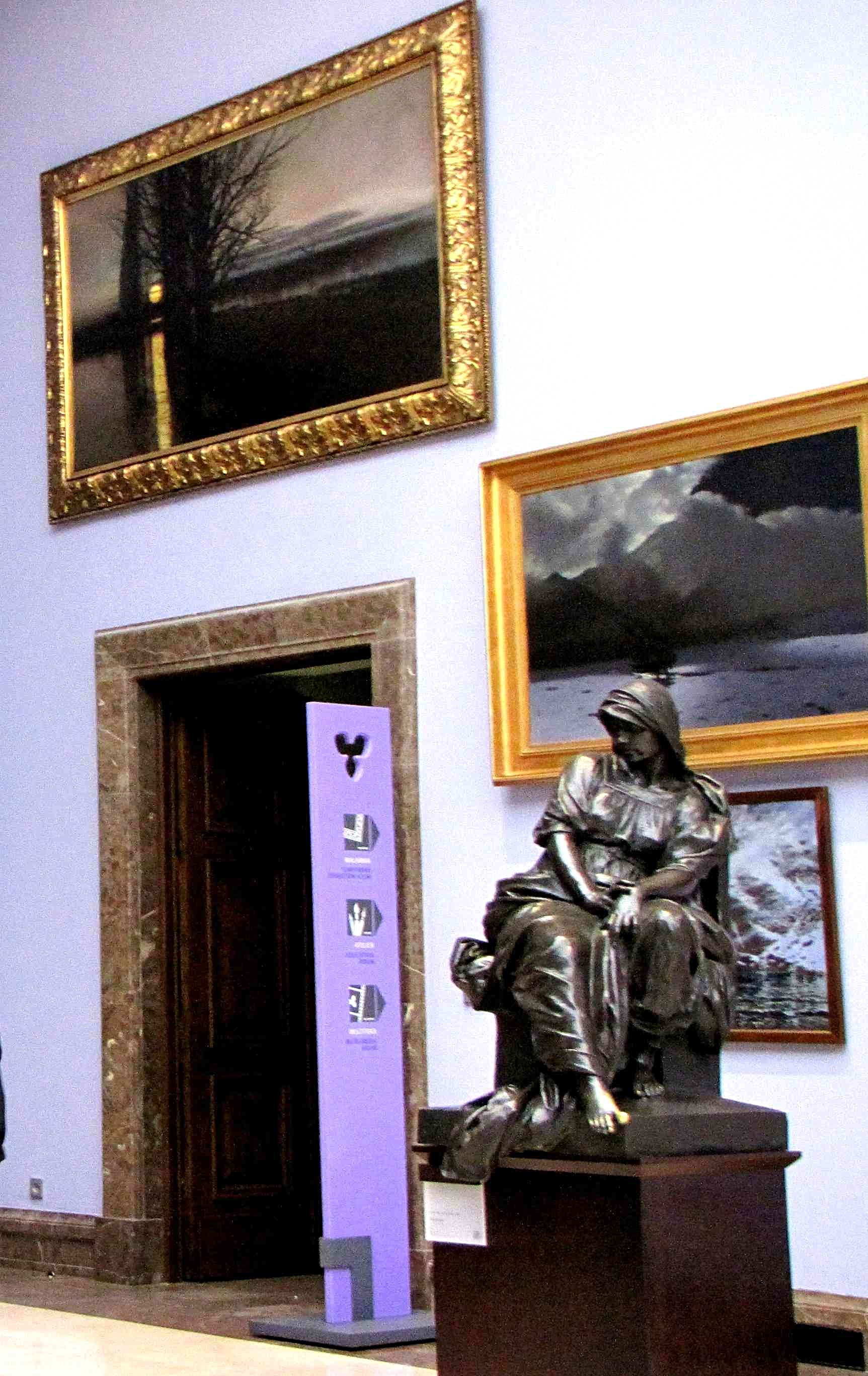
Moonrise, painting by Stanisław Masłowski – hanging right, above the door; National Museum, Kraków – Division: "Sukiennice Museum", photograph of 28 June 2011

Moonrise (Polish: Wschód księżyca) is an 1884 nocturne, landscape painting by the Polish artist Stanisław Masłowski. It is an oil-on-canvas painting, which measures 124 x 220 cm and is signed: "SMasłowski/Wars. 84.".

== Description ==
The painting shows a late evening, nocturne view of the vast panorama of the sky and the water. The water view is separated by a streak of sandy levee/dike and a number of trees – almost naked, leafless trunks. On the sky's background, gray horizontal cloud streaks are visible. Just above the horizon the golden-yellow shield of the Moon, partially covered with a gray, cloudy stripe, is painted. Its reflection over the surface of the water is visible in the shape of a golden vertical streak running from a distant horizon, towards the viewer. In the present painting Masłowski has solved the problem of dim light, the problem of its subtle gradation. The water, the sky, and the trees are the object of careful painter's attention.

== History and analysis ==
The present painting Masłowski has accomplished in the early stage of his artistic career, when he was just about thirty (1884).

Maciej Maslowski, artist's son, art historian noticed (1957), that the Moonrise painting was one of the few "nocturne pictures" where the moon was a "principal hero". First of them was the Distress – "unsuccessful melodrama" painting – originating of 1881. It's significant, that 1881 (August the 21st) was a date of artist's mother death

It was important in the artist's creative development in 1884–1887, when Masłowski [...] has entered a new phase of creativity and went into a new environment of art and has established close relations with a group of painters and writers associated with Wędrowiec magazine (A. Gierymski, A. Sygietyński, and young: J. Pankiewicz and W. Podkowiński).

The special place of the Moonrise painting in the development of Masłowski's work has been emphasized by Tadeusz Dobrowolski, an art historian and professor of the Jagiellonian University, in the following words (transl.): [...] "About 1880, the artist’s relationship with nature and a living model began to strengthen. However it was still understood in traditional (non-impressionist) terms. [...] The element of air and water, bare trees on the dike, which cuts into two parts a vast sheet of ponds, and the evening, the cloudy sky, and a mirrored moonlight on the water, bring a complete illusion of reality". The image is not typical for Maslowski's art, since the watercolour was his favourite technique of painting, particularly in later years.

The painting has been initially exhibited and reproduced under the different names – for instance: "Evening" (the exhibitions at The Society for the Encouragement of Fine Arts in Warsaw, 1884, and at The Kraków Society of Friends of Fine Arts, 1886); Moonrise (at the first Great Exhibition of Polish Art in Kraków, 1887); "Landscape at the moonlight" (at the Exhibition of Polish Art in Lviv, 1894, where it was praised), and in 1924 – as "Grobla Boruszkowiecka" ('Boruszkowce Dike')

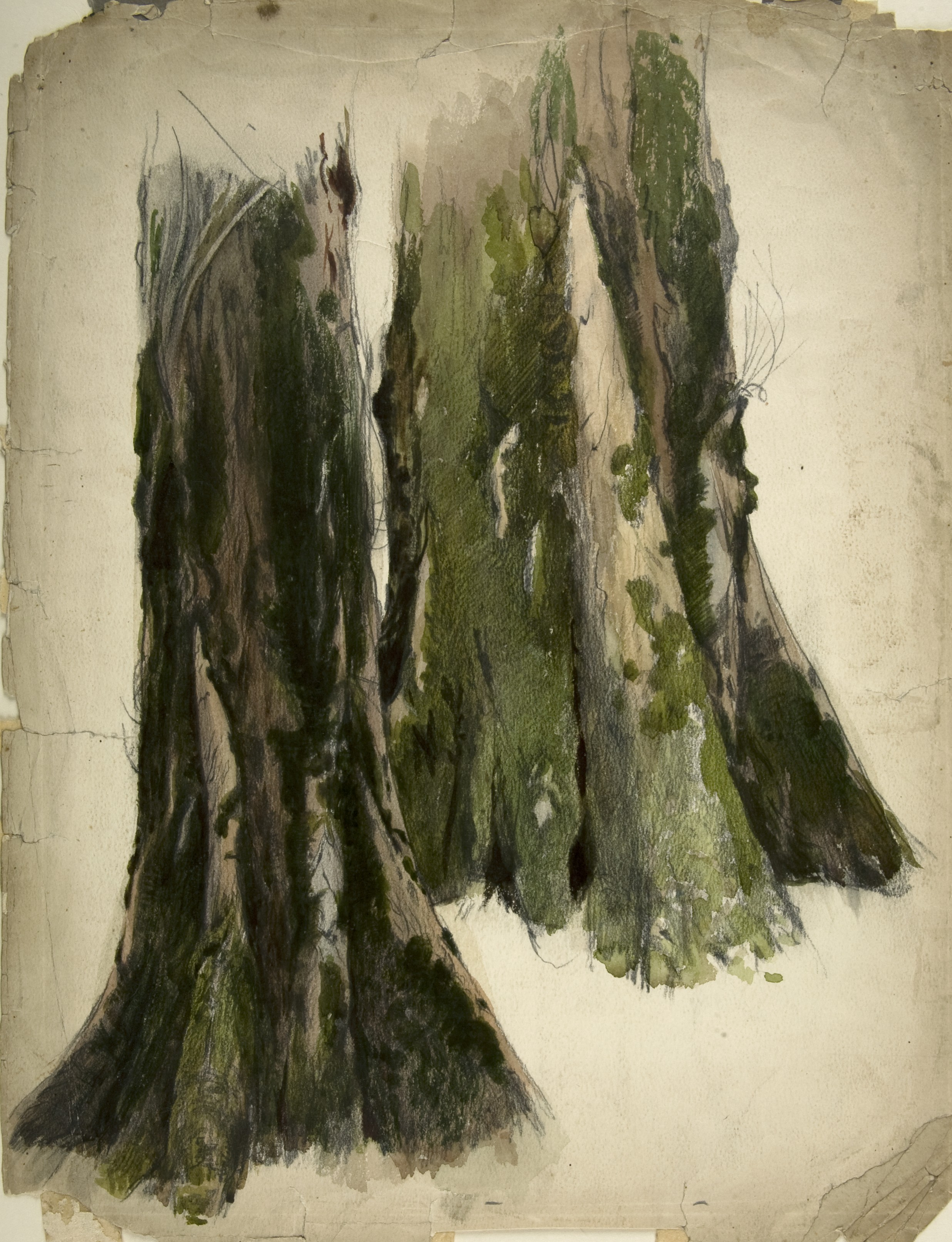
The Trunks sketch of The Populus trees to Moonrise painting, ca 1880 (phot. National Museum, Kraków)

In 1900 it has been purchased for the collection of the National Museum in Krakow and then reproduced, among others in Tygodnik Illustrowany, 1902, part I, p. 405; and in another Polish weekly Świat ("World"), Warsaw, 1907, no. 29, p. 5, as well as on the separate card, issued by The National Museum in Krakow.

According to the Maciej Masłowski, the painter's son and an art historian, despite the fact that the painting was created in realistic style – it had been inspired by Polish romantic poetry – by Słowacki's Beniowski poem.

Though the demonstrated here painting has been created in Poland, it has inspired the American lyric poet Sara Teasdale (1884–1933), who has written the following poem:

>>MOONLIGHT

It will not hurt me when I am old,

A running tide where moonlight burned

Will not sting me like silver snakes;

The years will make me sad and cold,

It is the happy heart that breaks.

The heart asks more than life can give,

When that is learned, then all is learned;

The waves break fold on jewelled fold,

But beauty itself is fugitive,

It will not hurt me when I am old.<<

Sara Teasdale

== See also ==
- List of Polish painters
