= Wojciech Gerson =

Polish painter (1831–1901)

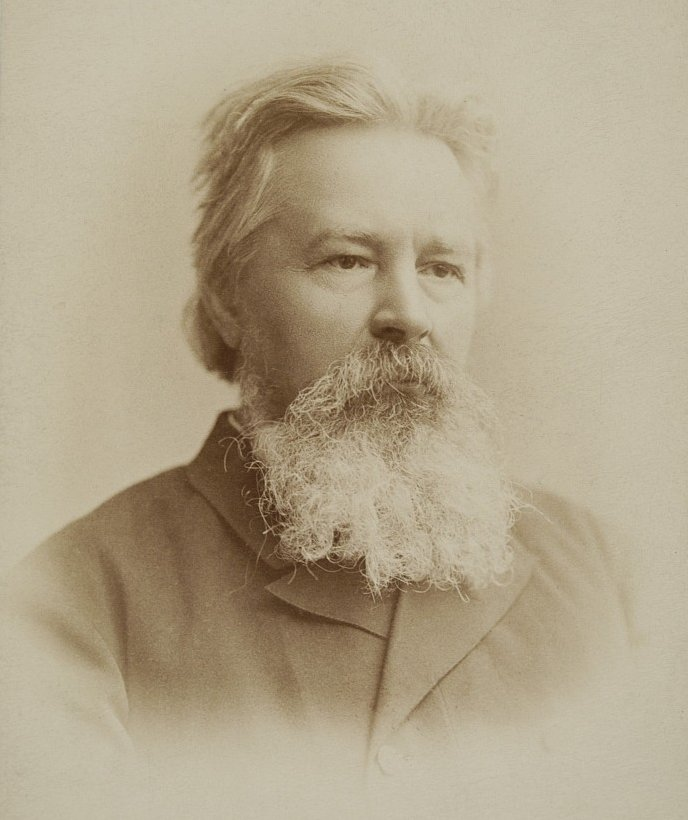
- Born: 1 July 1831; Warsaw, Congress Poland
- Died: 25 February 1901 (aged 69); Warsaw, Congress Poland
- Education: Academy of Fine Arts in Warsaw; Member Academy of Arts (1873) Professor by rank (1878)
- Known for: Painting, art education
- Movement: Romanticism

Wojciech Gerson (Polish: [ˈvɔjt͡ɕɛɣ ˈɡɛrsɔn]; 1 July 1831 – 25 February 1901) was a Polish painter, educator, architect and art critic who was one of the foremost representatives of the Polish school of Realism during the foreign Partitions of Poland. He served as long-time professor of the School of Fine Arts in Warsaw, and taught future luminaries of Polish neo-romanticism including Józef Chełmoński, Leon Wyczółkowski, Władysław Podkowiński, Józef Pankiewicz and Anna Bilińska-Bohdanowiczowa among others. He also wrote art-reviews and published a book of anatomy for the artists. A large number of his paintings were stolen by Nazi Germany in World War II, and never recovered.

== Biography ==
Gerson was born in Warsaw during the November Uprising against the Russians. He enrolled at the School of Fine Arts in Warsaw in 1844 and graduated with honors in 1850. In 1853 Gerson received a scholarship to the St. Petersburg Academy of Arts, and spent two years studying historical painting with Alexey Markov. He graduated with a silver medal in St. Petersburg and returned to Warsaw in 1855. He left for Paris in 1856 and studied under Léon Cogniet and others. Gerson came back to Poland in February 1858. He resided in Warsaw for the rest of his life, nevertheless continued to travel abroad, until the turn of the century.

Gerson was a co-founder of the Fine-Arts Society "Zachęta" established in 1860. It was the first support-group of its kind in Warsaw under the foreign occupation. He began to teach art in his own workshop in 1865, and became professor at the School of Fine Arts (future Academy of Fine Arts in Warsaw) in 1872. He trained a generation of future Polish artists there, until his retirement in 1896. Gerson introduced the outdoor landscape trips and genre studies to his students with considerable impact on the art of Józef Chełmoński, the monumental painter with gallery named after him at Sukiennice; Leon Wyczółkowski, the leading field painter of the Young Poland movement; Antoni Piotrowski revered as far as Bulgaria for his epic war-scenes, as well as impressionist Władysław Podkowiński and his contemporaries. Gerson was granted the title of academic by the St. Petersburg Fine Arts Academy in 1873 and named a professor in 1878.

Gerson also worked as an architect and art critic. He is revered in Poland for his historical paintings of patriotic nature, scenes of country life, and mountain landscapes. Gerson died in Warsaw, at the age of 70, and is buried in the Evangelical Cemetery of the Augsburg Confession in Warsaw. His paintings can be seen at the National Museum, Warsaw; Upper Silesian Museum in Bytom, and in other branches of the National Museum of Poland as well as in selected churches.

== Selected historical paintings ==
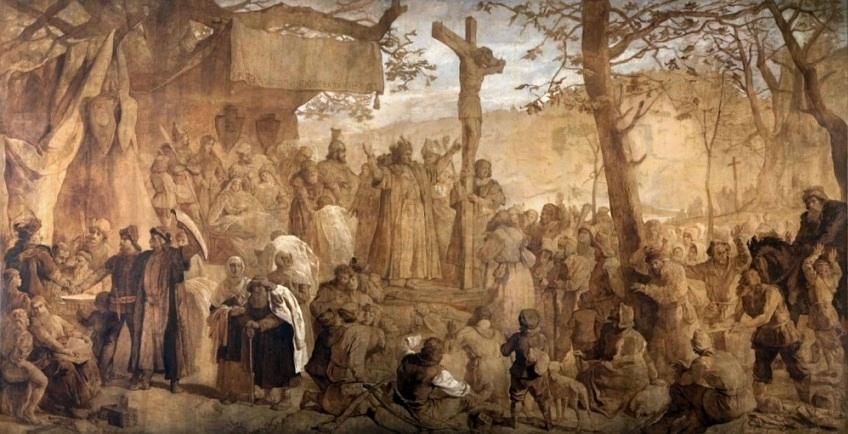
Baptism of Lithuania, Museum of John Paul II Collection

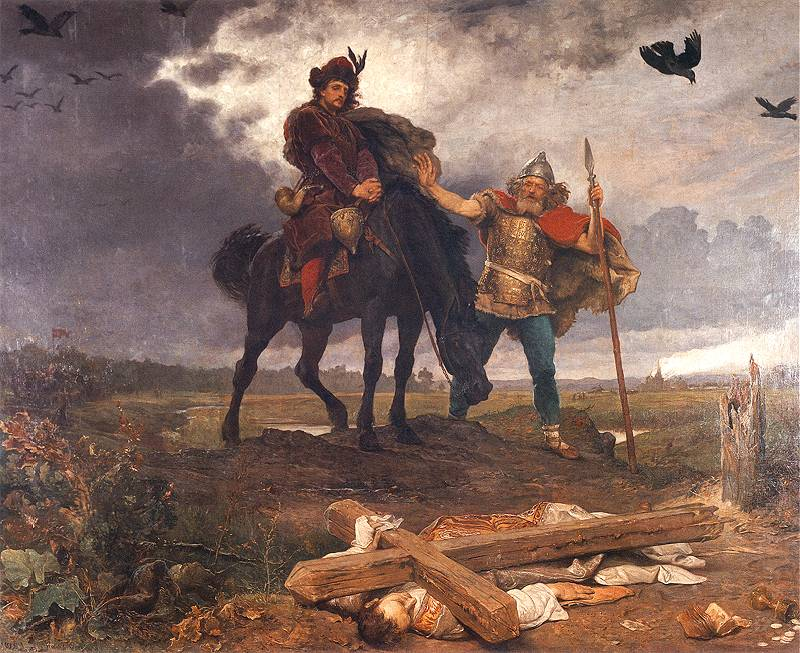
Kazimierz Odnowiciel, National Museum, Wrocław

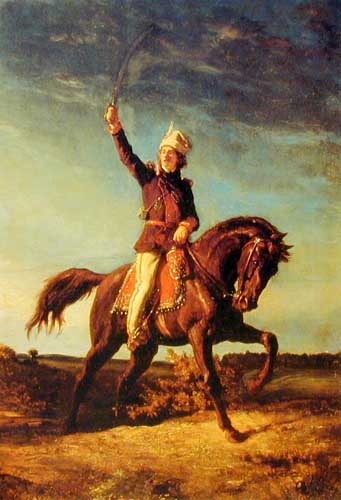
Kościuszko

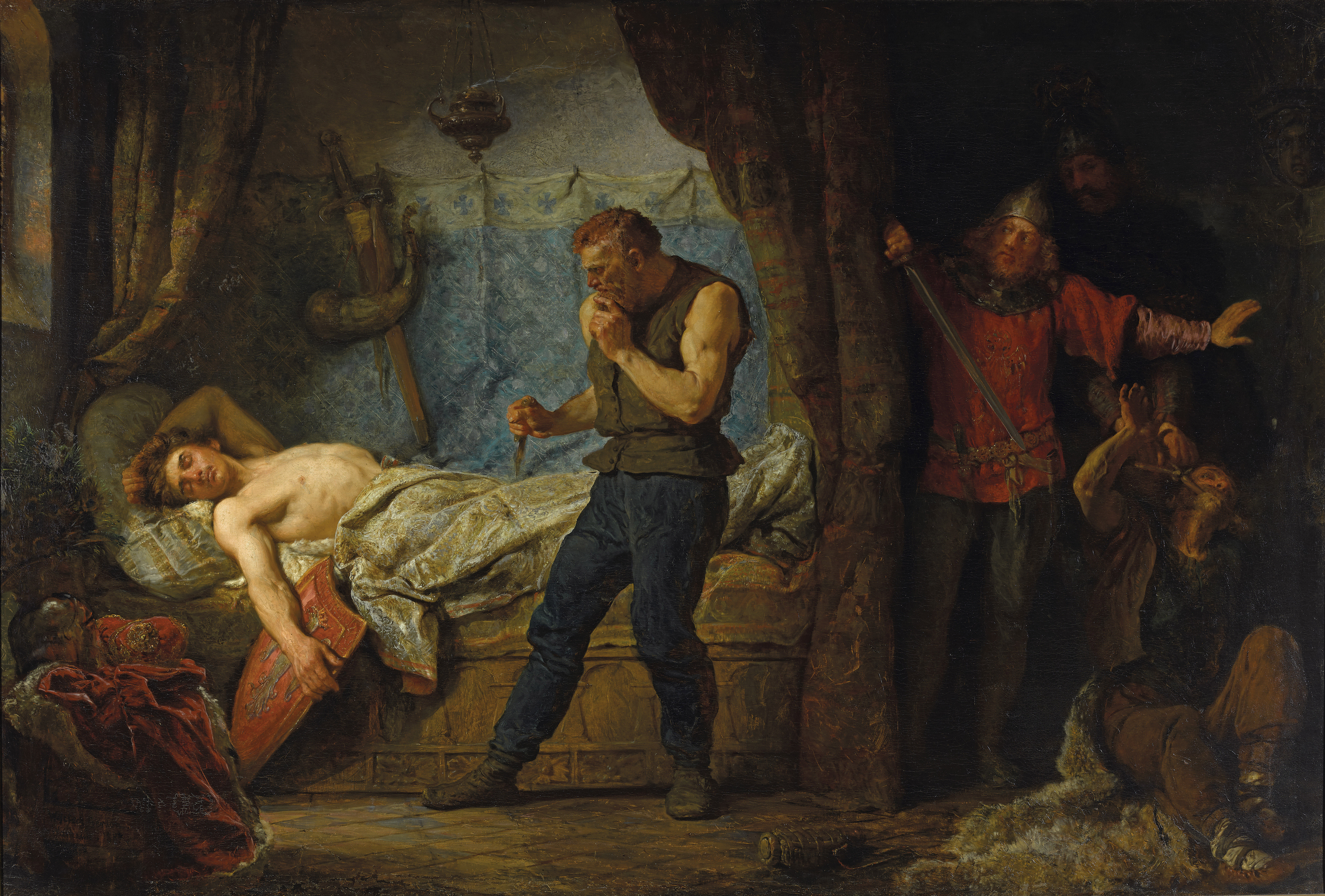
Death of Przemyslaw II, National Museum, Warsaw

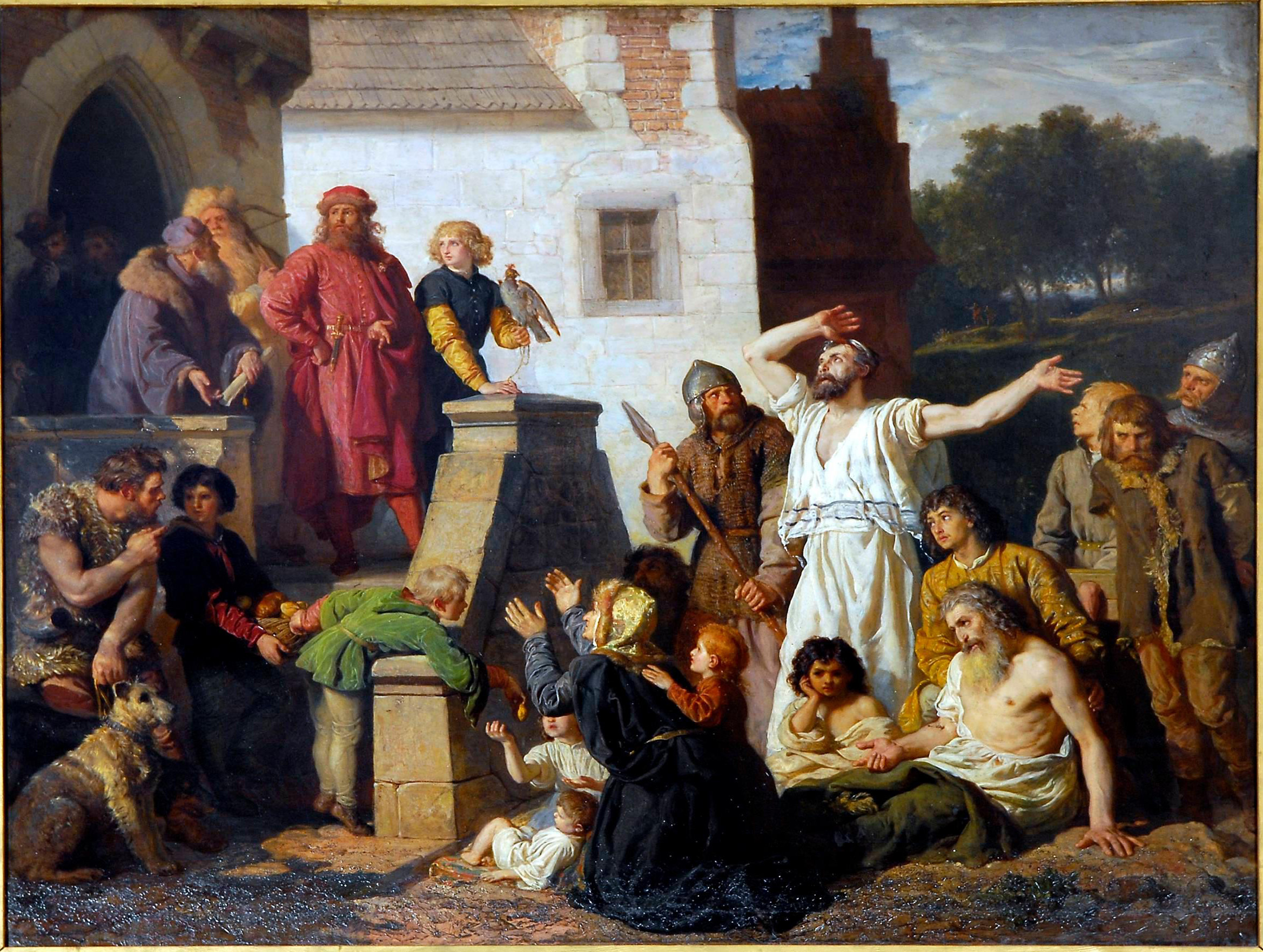
Kazimierz Wielki and Jews, National Museum, Warsaw

== Archival photographs of selected artwork looted by Germans ==
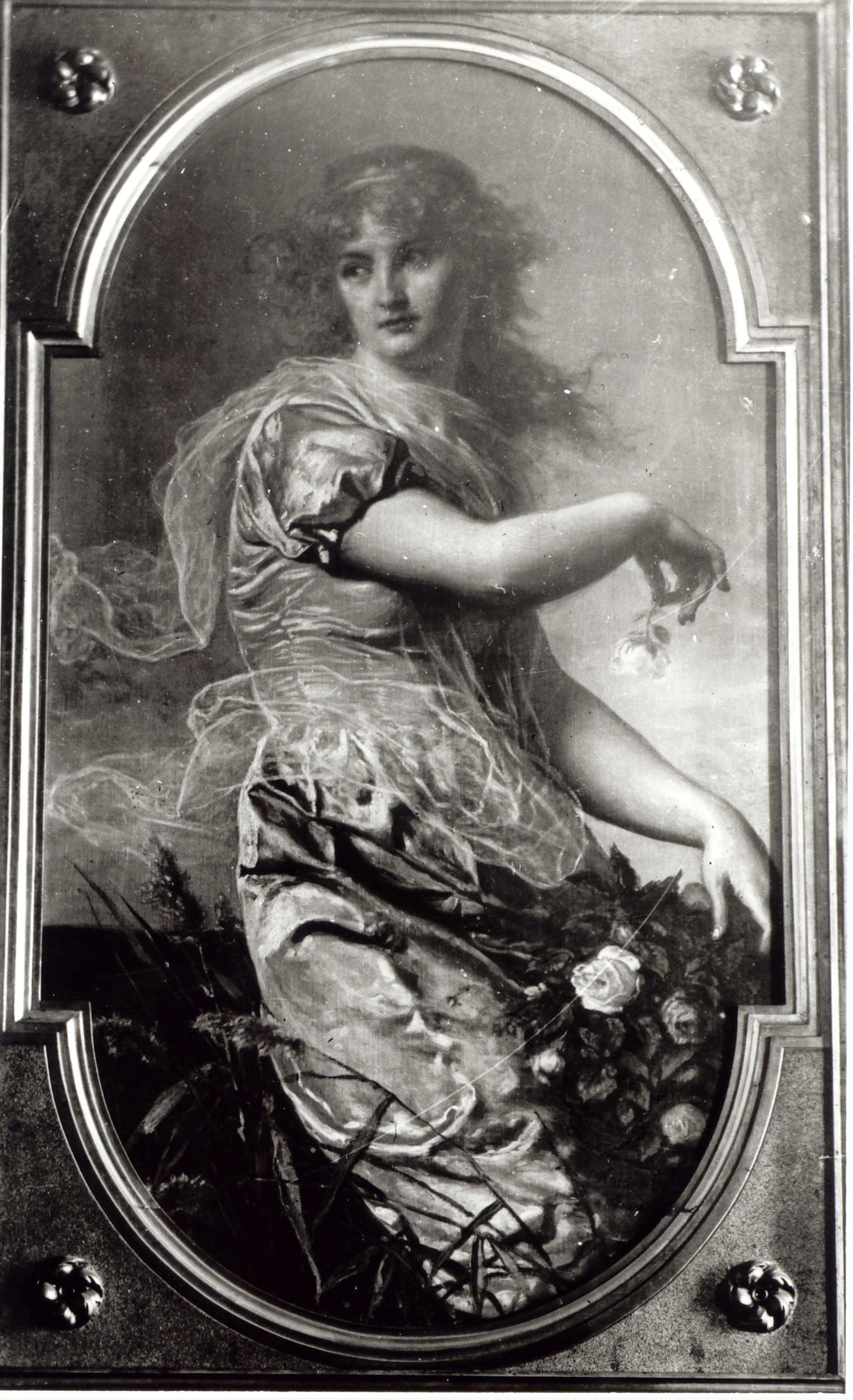
Morning

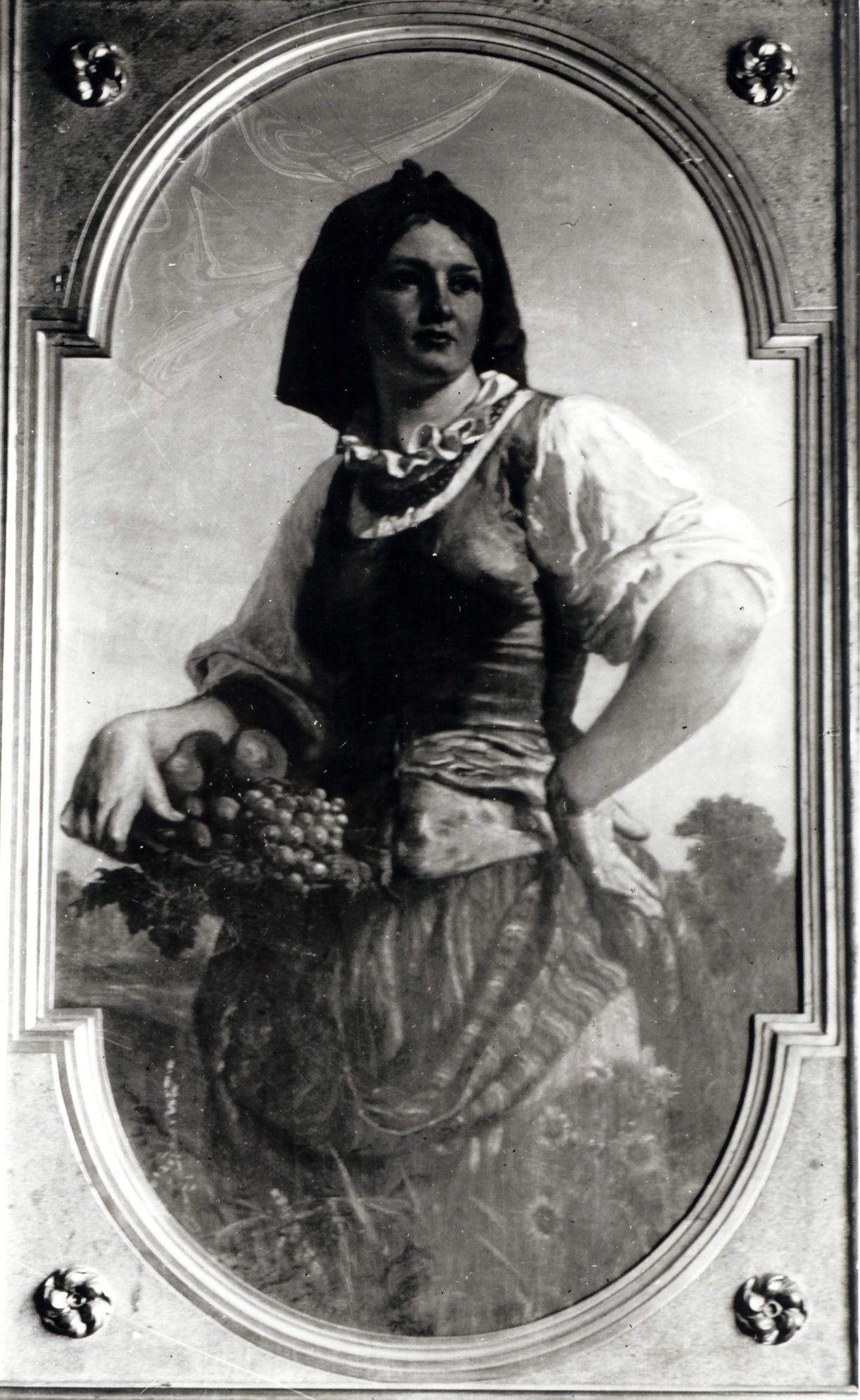
In the Evening

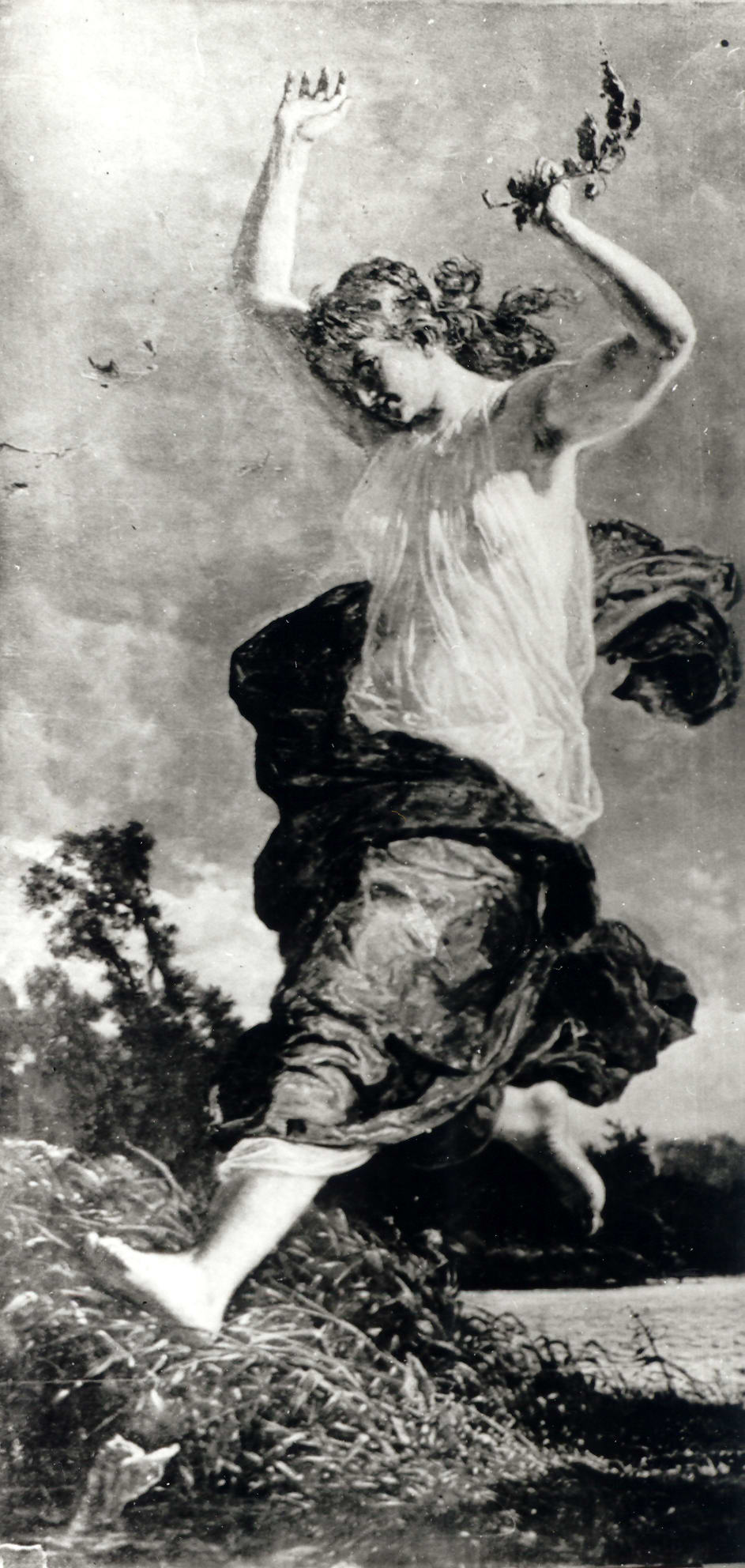
Whirlwind

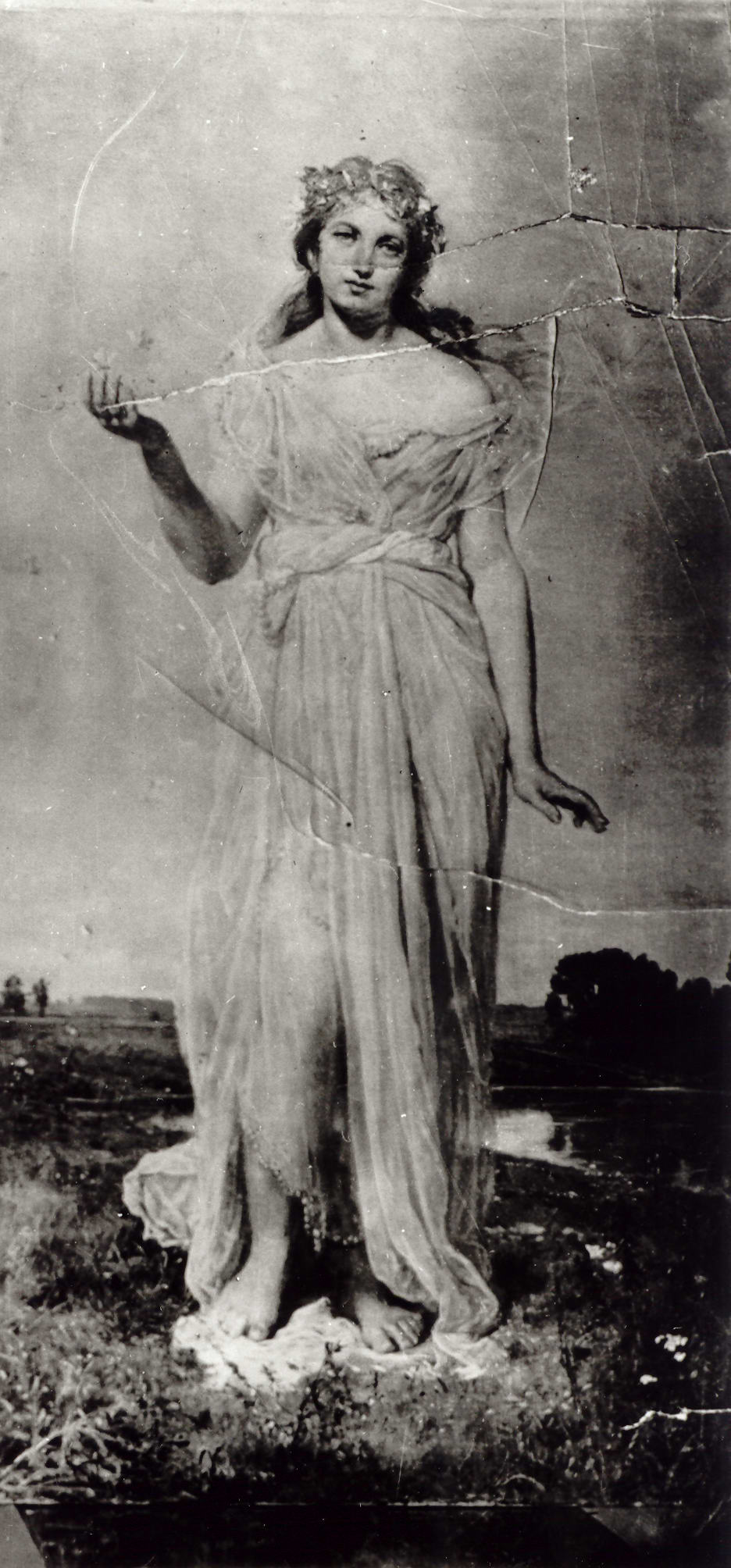
Weather

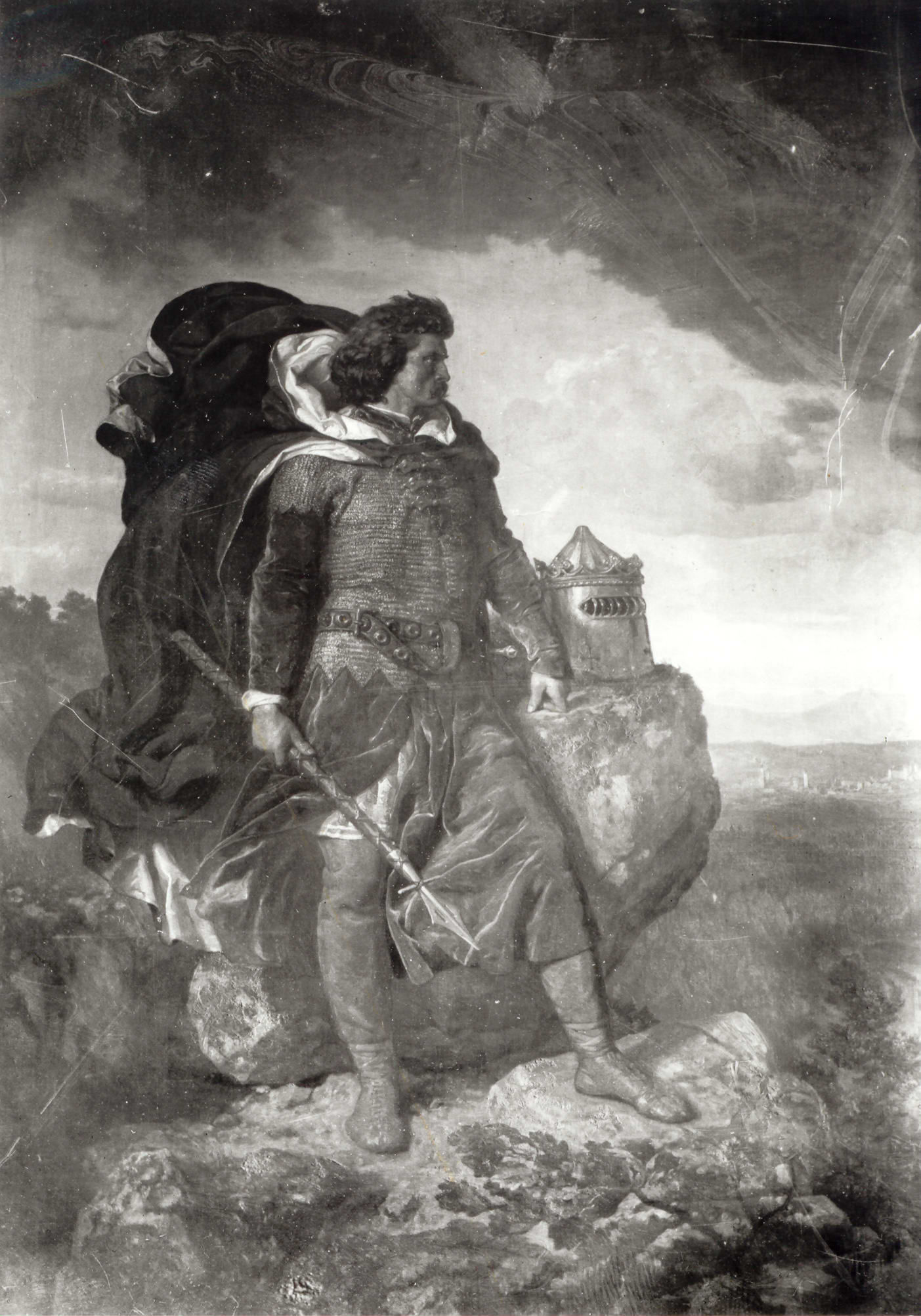
Łokietek on Skałki

== Literature ==
- С. Н. Кондаков (1915). Юбилейный справочник Императорской Академии художеств. 1764-1914 (in Russian). Vol. 2. p. 47.
