= Sukiennice Museum =

Coordinates: 50°03′42″N 19°56′14″E

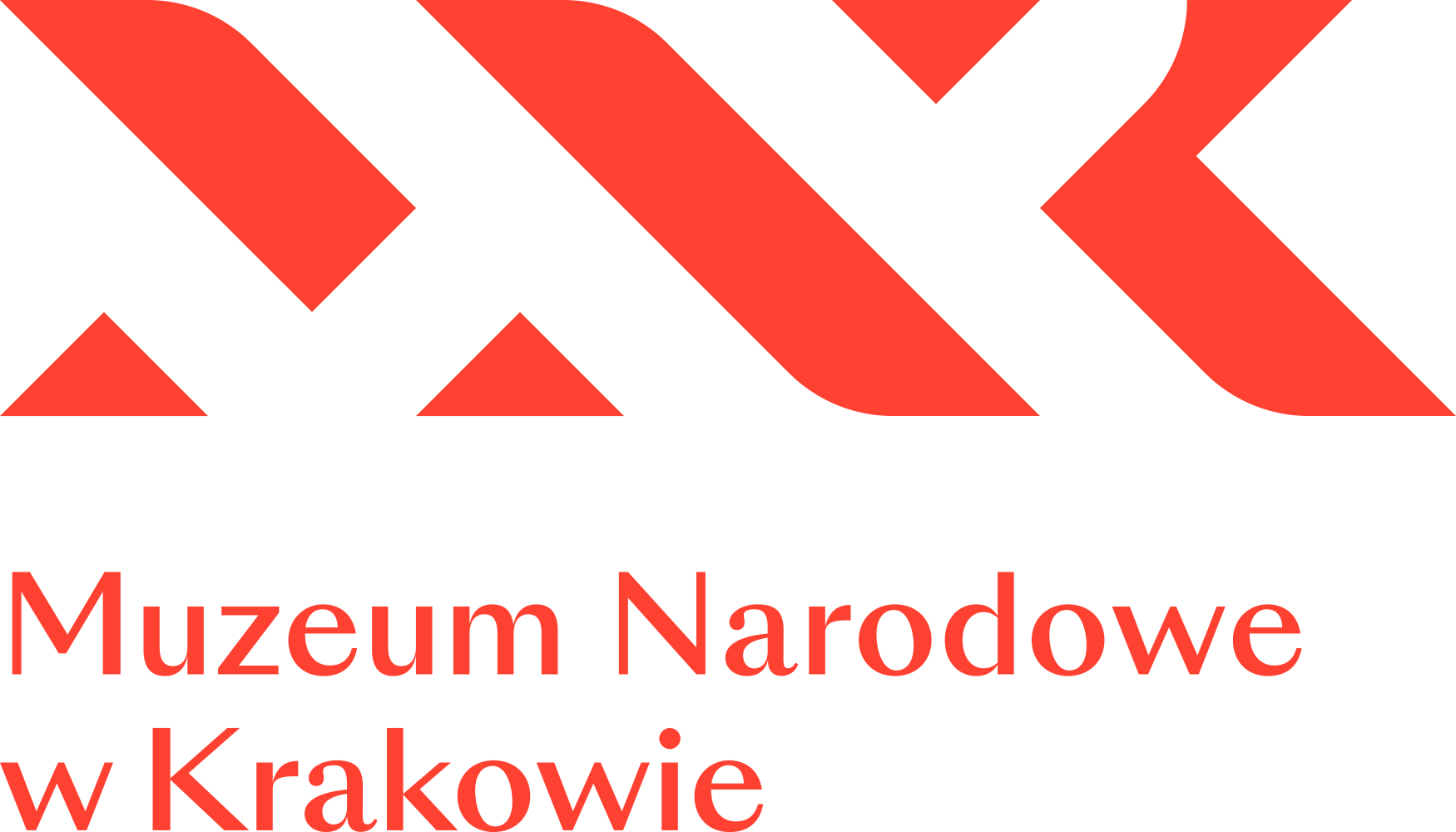

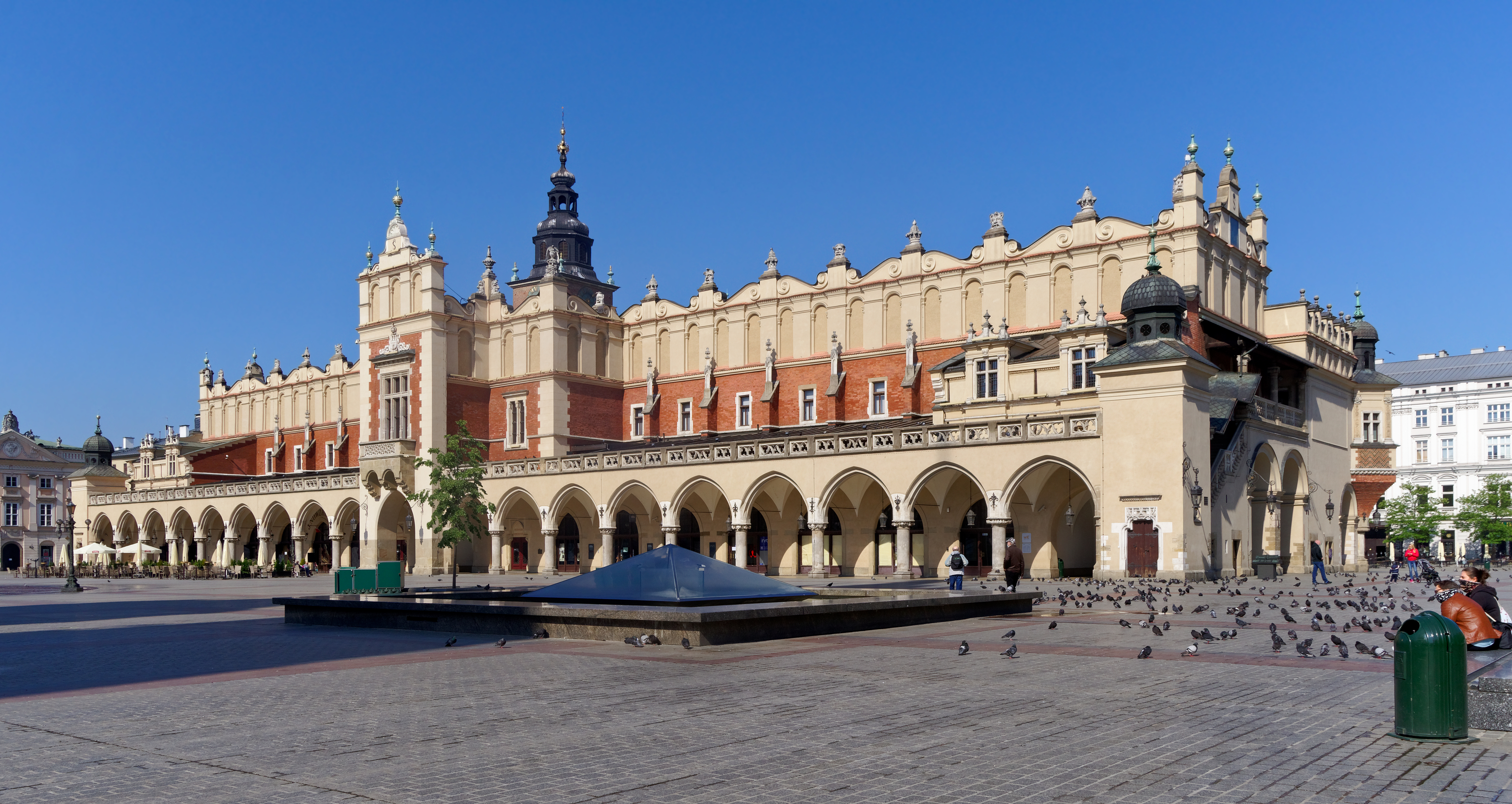
- Established: 1879
- Location: Main Market Square; Kraków, Poland
- Type: National museum
- Director: Jerzy Derdaś
- Website: mnk.pl/branch/mnk-the-sukiennice

The Gallery of 19th-Century Polish Art at Sukiennice (Polish: Galeria Sztuki Polskiej XIX wieku w Sukiennicach), is a division of the National Museum, Kraków, Poland. The gallery is housed on the upper floor of the Renaissance Sukiennice Cloth Hall in the center of the Main Market Square in Old Town Kraków.

The gallery holds the largest permanent exhibit of 19th-century Polish painting and sculpture, in four grand rooms. The majority of today's collection at Sukiennice comprises gifts from collectors, artists, and their families.

== History of the collection ==
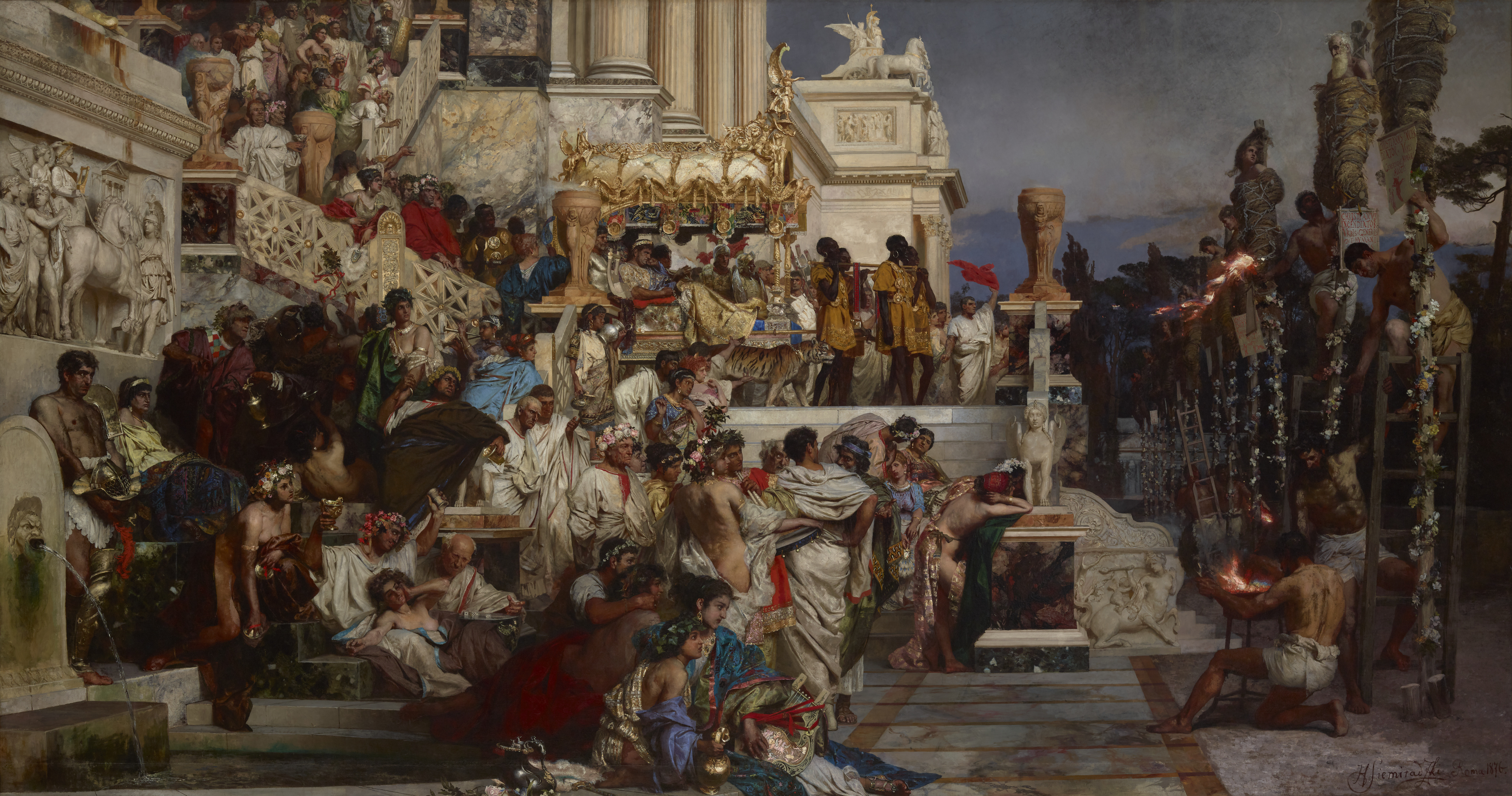
Pochodnie Nerona (Nero's Torches) by Henryk Siemiradzki, 1876

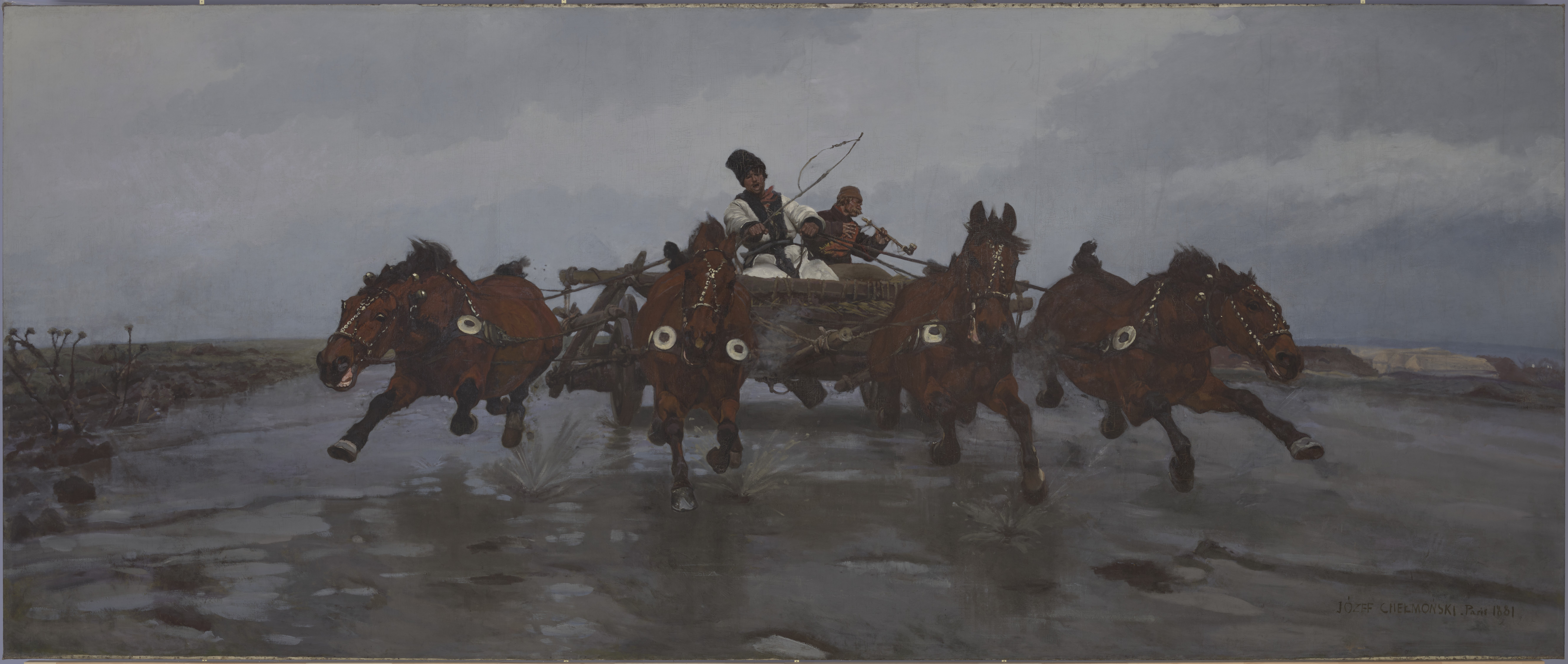
Czwórka (Four-in-Hand) by Józef Chełmoński, 1881

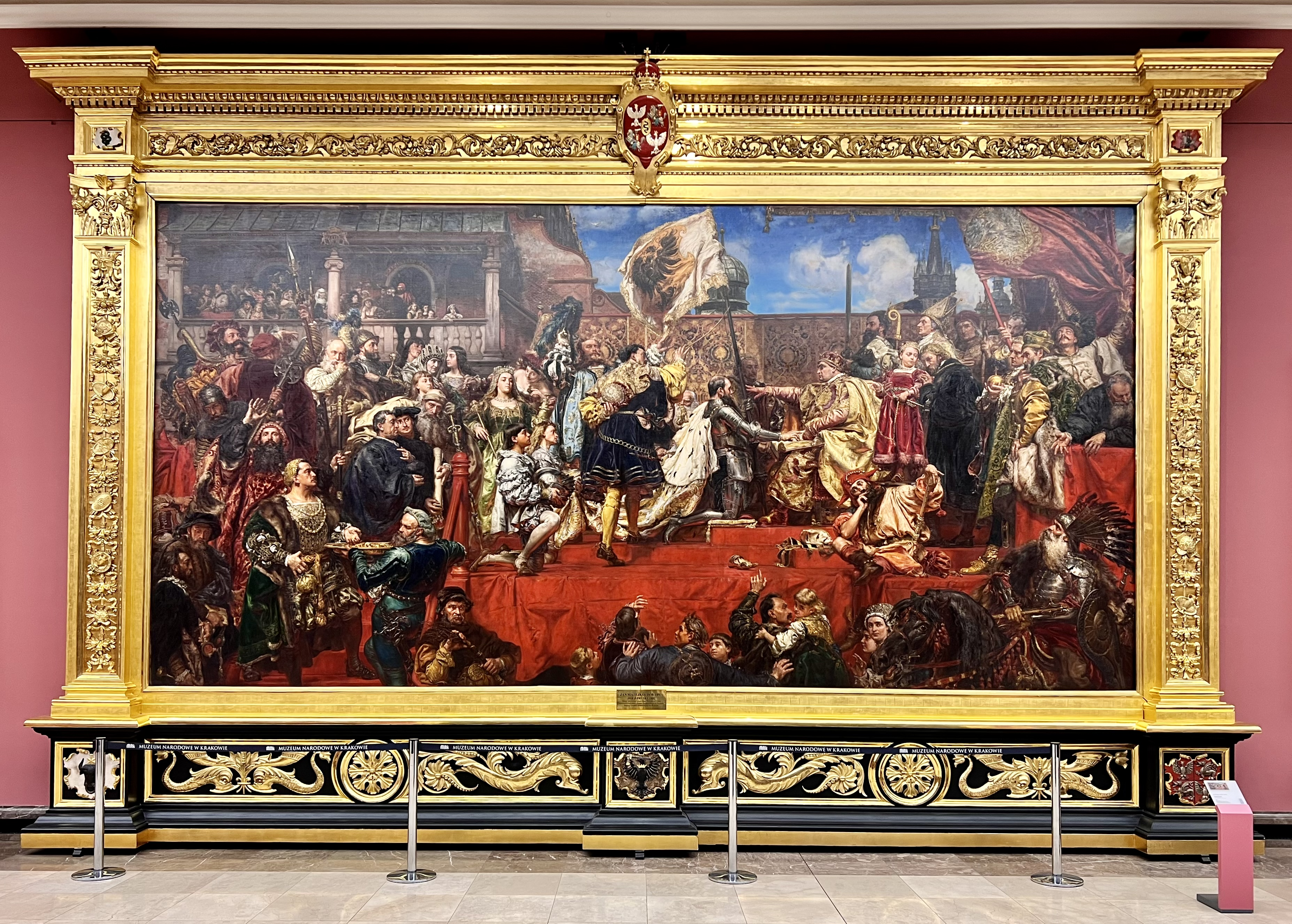
The Prussian Homage by Jan Matejko, 1879-1882, in Siemiradzki Room

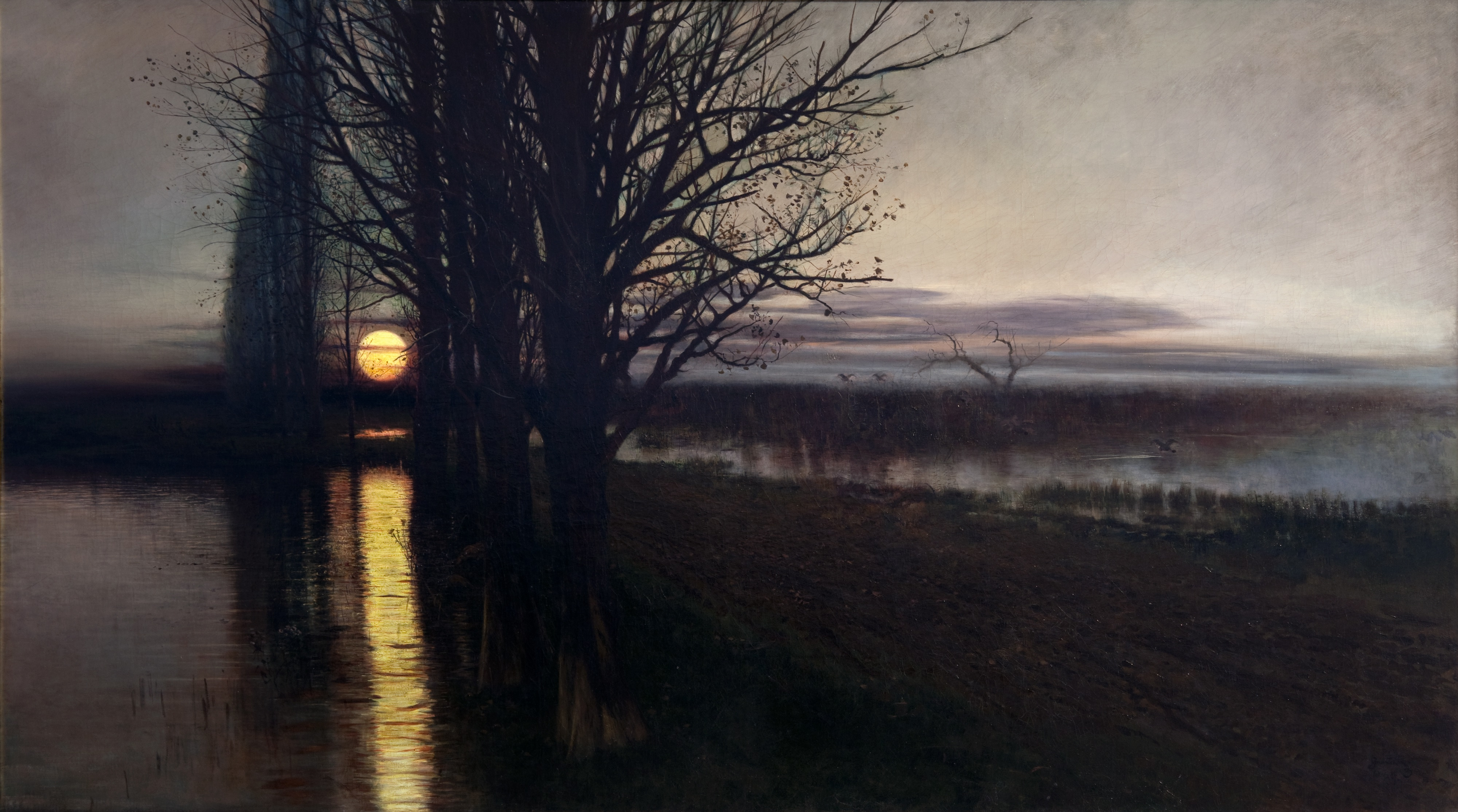
Wschód księżyca (Moonrise) by Stanisław Masłowski, 1884

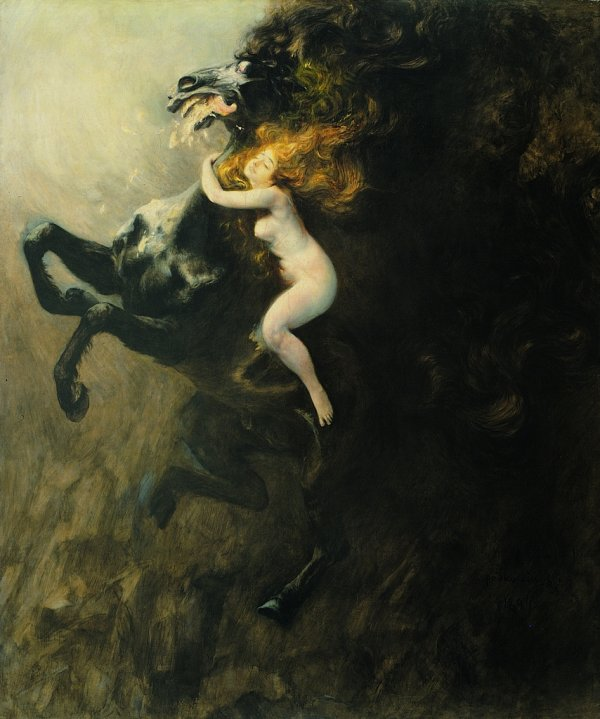
Szał uniesień (Ecstasy) by Władysław Podkowiński, 1894

The National Museum in Kraków was founded on October 7, 1879, by the decree of Kraków City Council following two-year-long renovations of the Sukiennice Cloth Hall under the direction of Mayor Mikołaj Zyblikiewicz. At a ceremonial ball of October 3, 1879, it was announced that artist Henryk Siemiradzki had offered his monumental painting called Nero's Torches (Pochodnie Nerona) as gift to the city, with the intention of creating a brand new national gallery in the building. The new museum elected Władysław Łuszczkiewicz, rector of the Academy of Fine Arts, as its first director. It was a major cultural venue from the moment it opened. The collection grew rapidly under the foreign partitions, with spontaneous donations pouring in from local gentry, as well as artists themselves.

By the late 1930s, the collections consisted of almost 300,000 items. The list of major benefactors grew exponentially, including many noble families. In 1920, the museum acquired over 15,000 objects donated by a single collector, Feliks Manggha Jasieński, Dołęga coat-of arms. The construction of the museum's contemporary New Main Building, located at 3 Maja Street, started in 1934. All holdings, ranging from antiquity to modern times were moved there.

The gallery was closed to visitors from October 2006 till 2009 for major renovations; the bulk of the gallery's collections moved to Niepołomice Castle for temporary display. The gallery re-opened in 2010 with new technical equipment, storerooms, and service spaces, as well as improved thematic layout of the display, providing a broader view of Polish art of the time.

== Arrangement ==
The gallery's arrangement resembles that of a 19th-century salon. Each of the four large exhibition halls is defined by historical period and the theme usually revolving around the one central painting extending into an entire artistic epoch.

Bacciarelli Room

The Enlightenment Room, also known as the Bacciarelli Room, features late Baroque, Rococo, and Classicist 18th-century portraits from the court of Stanisław August, as well as historical paintings and battle scenes by Polish and foreign pre-Romantics; most notably, artwork by Marcello Bacciarelli, Josef Grassi, Giambattista Lampi, Per Krafft, Józef Pitschmann, Aleksander Orłowski, Franciszek Smuglewicz, Michał Stachowicz, Kazimierz Wojniakowski and similar others.

Michałowski Room

The Piotr Michałowski Room, called Romanticism or the age of insurrections, includes the art of Artur Grottger and Michałowski's own battle scenes with his famed "Somosierra" as well as paintings of "The Cardinal", "Seńko" and portraits on horseback. Other artists include Henryk Rodakowski, Jan Nepomucen Głowacki – father of Polish school of landscape painting, Józef Simmler and Aleksander Józef Płonczyński among others.

Siemiradzki Room

The Henryk Siemiradzki Room, entitled "Around the Academy", prominently displays the monumental Nero's Torches, a gift by an already world-renowned Siemiradzki to the museum, painted around 1876. The exhibit revolves around the art of the late 19th century; mythological and biblical scenes, major historical events, independence themes, landscape, and still-life. Featured artists include Jan Matejko, Wojciech Gerson, Jacek Malczewski, Tadeusz Ajdukiewicz, as well as Władysław Łuszczkiewicz, Henryk Rodakowski and others. Following major 2007 conservation the historical panorama Prussian Homage by Matejko is also prominently featured.

Chełmoński Room

The Józef Chełmoński Room, also called "Realism, Polish Impressionism and Symbolism", is devoted to new trends in Polish art of the late 19th century featuring landscape and genre painting, portraits, battle and domestic scenes by leading painters of the Young Poland movement, notably by Chełmoński himself with his Four-in-Hand (Czwórka, pictured), Maksymilian and Aleksander Gierymski, Józef Pankiewicz, and Leon Wyczółkowski (prominent impressionists); paintings by Wojciech Gerson, Julian Fałat, Adam Chmielowski, Stanisław Masłowski ("Moonrise") and Józef Brandt, as well as large and controversial Ecstasy, or Frenzy of Exultations (1894, pictured) by Władysław Podkowiński, and many others. Symbolism is represented by the art of Jacek Malczewski.

Sculpture

Sculptures include Pius Weloński's "Gladiator", Walery Gadomski's "Salome", Piotr Wójtowicz's "Perseus With the Head of Medusa", Teodor Rygier's "Bacchante" – he is the author of Adam Mickiewicz Monument adorning the entrance to the museum on the east side of Kraków Main Square; Antoni Pleszowski's "Sadness", Piotr Michałowski's "Napoleon on Horseback" and Stanisław Lewandowski's "A Slav Breaking Chains". Among the collection of portrait sculptures are, Piotr Michałowski's self-portraits, Antoni Kurzawa's "Mickiewicz Awaking the Genius of Poetry", Antoni Madeyski's "Portrait of Aleksander Gierymski", Wiktor Brodzki's "Instigations of Love", Piotr Wójtowicz's "After a Bath" and Antoni Madeyski's "Greyhound".

== See also ==
- Sukiennice (Kraków Cloth Hall)
- National Museum in Kraków
- EUROPEUM – European Culture Centre
- Culture of Kraków

== Theme rooms ==
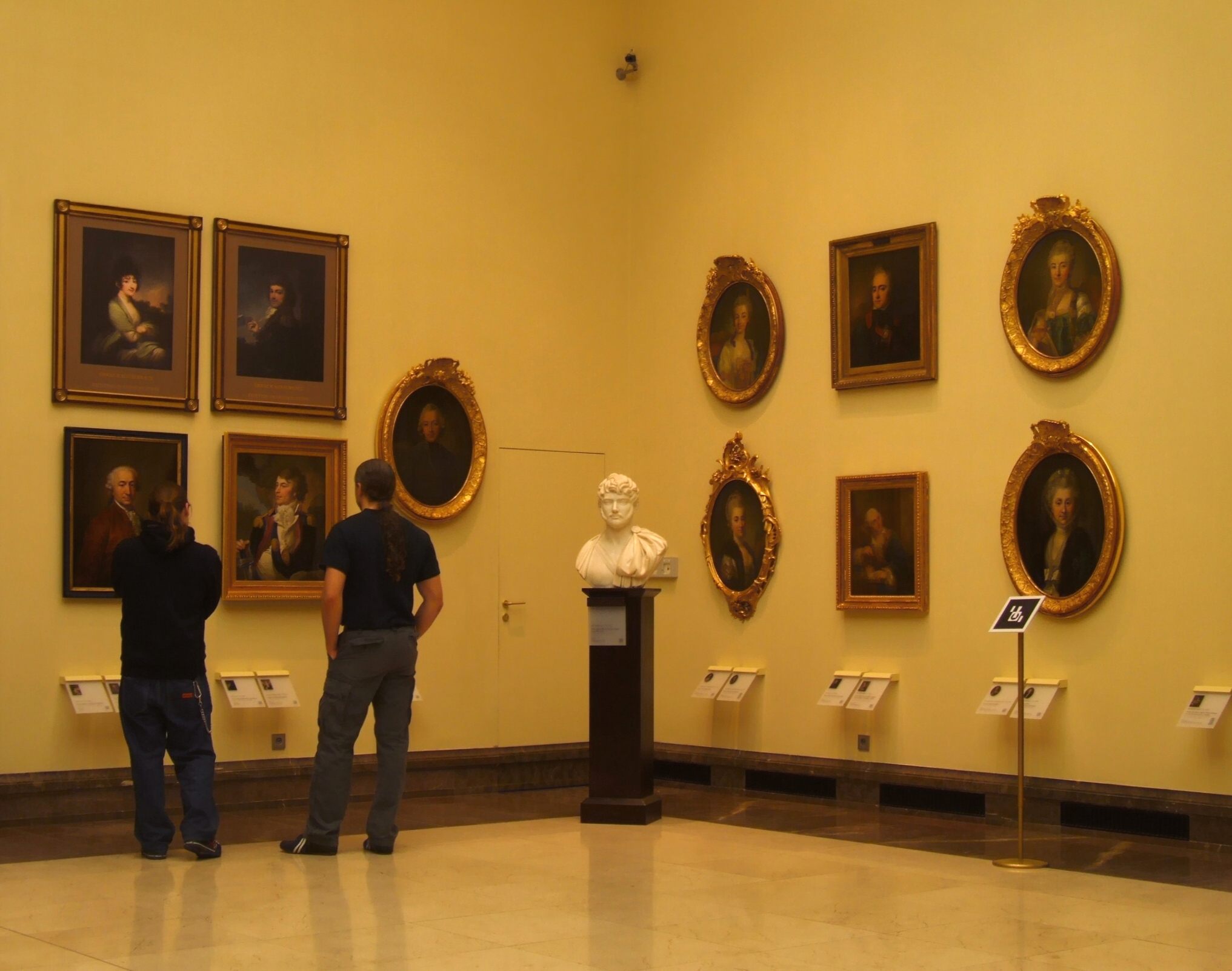
Bacciarelli Room

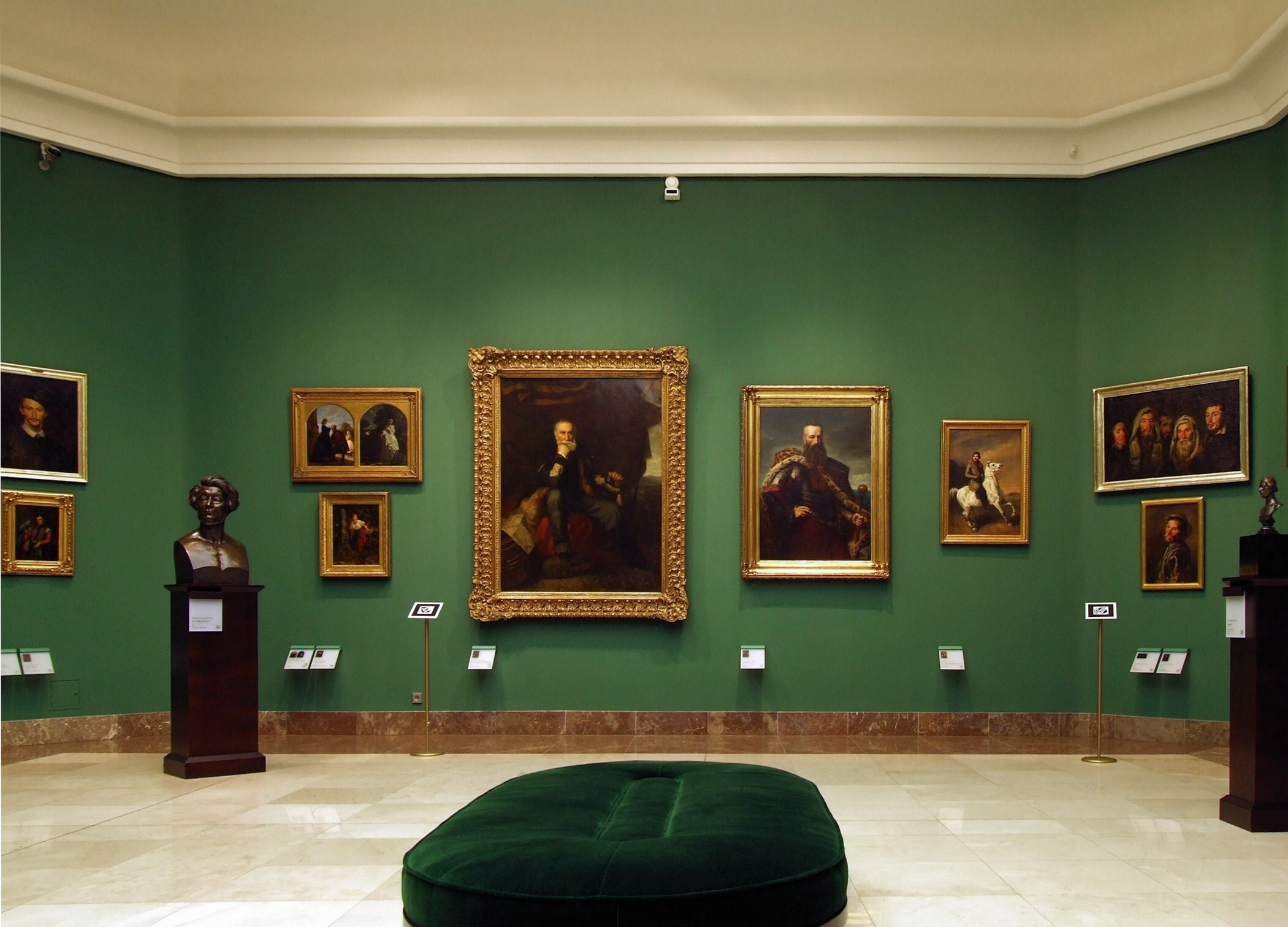
Michałowski Room

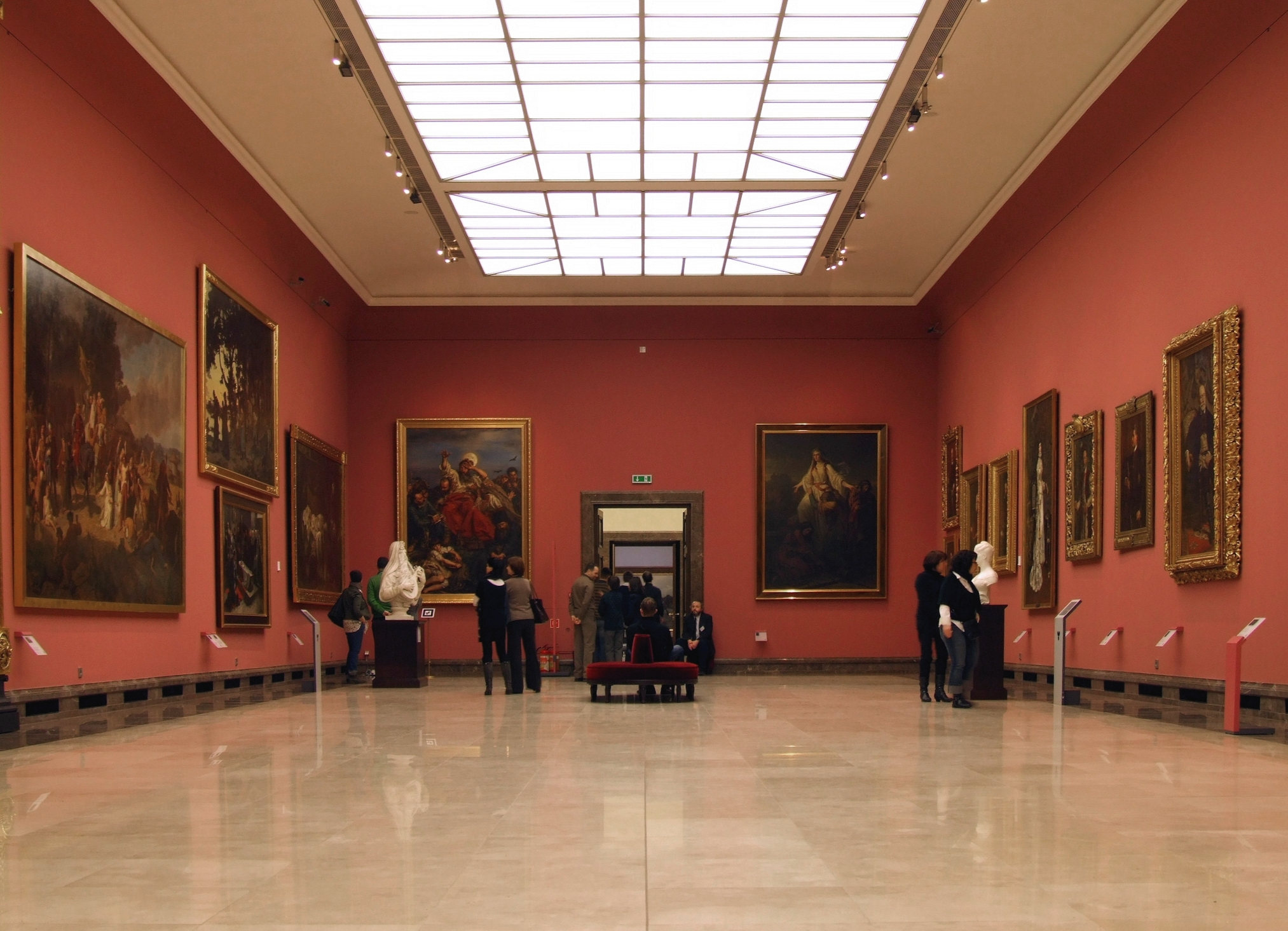
Siemiradzki Room

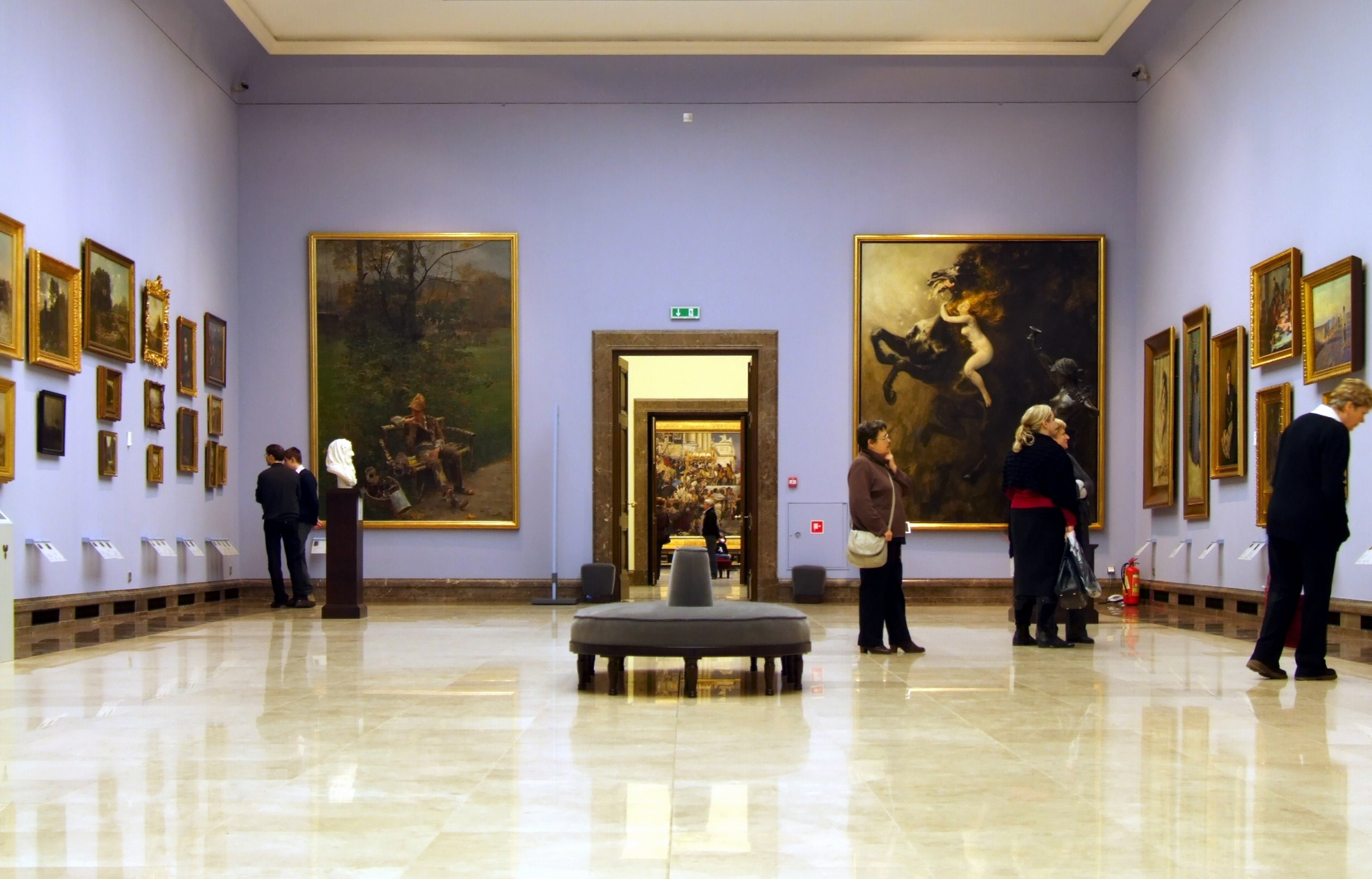
Chełmoński Room
