= Polish Impressionism =

Art movement inspired by French Impressionism

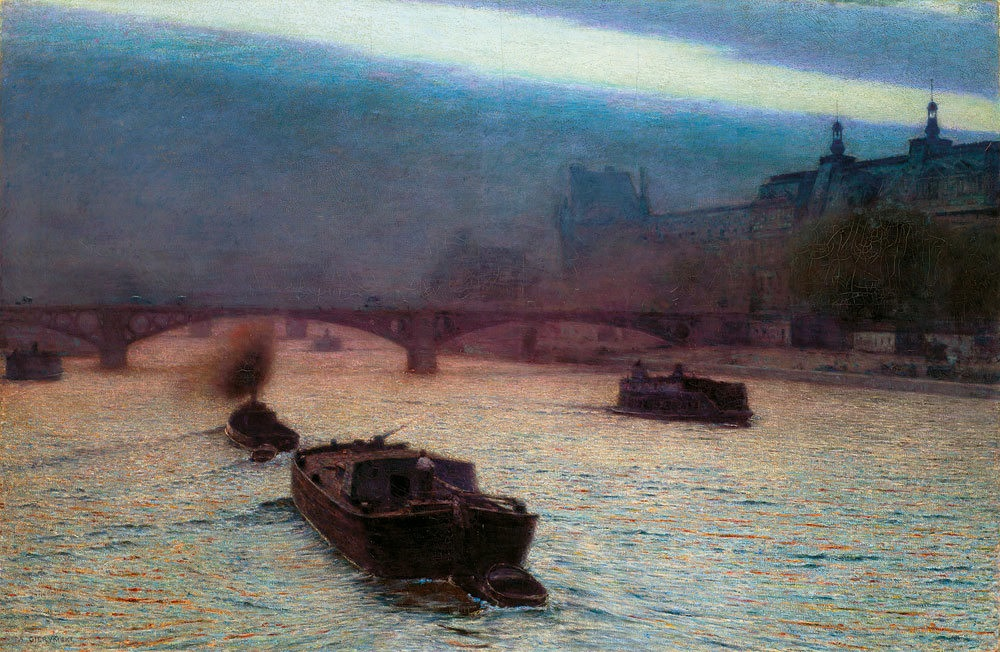
Alexander Gierymski, Evening on the Seine, 1893

Polish Impressionism was an art movement inspired by French Impressionism. Władysław Podkowiński is generally credited with introducing the movement to Poland after a trip to Paris in 1889, where he was profoundly influenced by French Impressionist painters including Claude Monet. Toward the end of his life, however, he turned more toward Symbolism. Olga Boznańska is possibly the most well known Polish Impressionist, recognized in London and Paris, and winning many prizes. The French Government purchased two of her works.

== Overview ==
Impressionism began in France in the second half of the 19th century, when Paris-based artists publicly showed their art. The movement is characterized by the exposition of light in its changing stages, open composition and visualization. Artists worked mainly in the outdoor – en plein air, the most important thing being to emphasize vivid colors from everyday life. Although impressionism brought freshness and a completely new perspective of the world, it was received with skepticism at first. Contrary to expectations it received the attention of artists and soon won recognition all around the world. Within a short period of time it came also to Poland.

== Notable artists ==
=== Olga Boznanska ===
The first Polish artist who represented impressionism was Olga Boznańska (born on 15 April 1865 in Kraków, died on 26 October 1940 in Paris), who studied painting in her childhood. As a daughter of a Polish engineer she had an opportunity to practice in Germany, Austria, and France. In 1894 she was awarded 1st prize by Archduke Karl Ludwig of Austria in Vienna for her "Paul Nauen" portrait, and for her portrait of "Miss Marry Breme", she obtained recognition in London. In 1986 jury of Societe des Beaux-Arts in Paris accepted one of her works for the exhibition. After moving to Paris she joined the Polish Artistic Society "Art".

In 1900 at the exhibition in New Gallery she was awarded the golden medal. The French government bought "Bretonka" and "Miss Dygat portrait" for their national collection. She also became a member of Société Nationale des Beaux Arts. After her later successes she represented France, with Claude Monet and August Renoir, at the exhibition in Pittsburgh in 1912.

Most of her works were portraits, many self portraits, and interiors. She used oils in the grey and dark green tones, her paintings were full of nostalgia and sorrow.

The best known of her paintings are: "Woman’s portrait", "Girl with chrysanthemums", "Miss Dygat Portrait", "Flowers".

=== Józef Pankiewicz and Władysław Podkowiński ===
Both were born in 1866 and at the age of 19 they went on to scholarships in Saint Petersburg.

After acquainting themselves with the works of the French impressionists, Jozef Pankiewicz started to be forerunner of impressionism in Poland. In the beginning his works faced skepticism of Polish critics. After gaining golden medal for "Mrs. Oderfeld" portrait on the Universal Exhibition in Paris his talent started to be highly considered in his mother land. His paintings were outdoor compositions: he created landscapes full of brightness and vivid colors.

Jozef Pankiewicz's famous works were: "Girl in the red dress", "Swans in the Saski Park", "Still life with fruits and knife", "Street in Madrid", "Terrace in Madrid", "Still life with green pitcher" and, in opinion of many critics, the most ideal painting "Fruits in the basket".

Władysław Podkowiński painted landscapes, portraits and symbolic scenes. His best known painting is scandalous "Range". He is also known for his "Nowy Swiat street", and for his illustrations for magazines, books and calendars.

== Bibliography ==
- "Wielcy Malarze. Ich życie, inspiracje i dzieło", nr 15, ISSN 1505-9464
- "Historia sztuki polskiej" Wydawnictwo Literacki Kraków, 1965, tom III
- Janusz Janowski, Józef Pankiewicz wobec "łacińskiej tradycji" malarstwa europejskiego, "Pamiętnik Sztuk Pięknych. Uniwersytet Mikołaja Kopernika" 1(4) z 2003, pp. 9–36.
