= Władysław Podkowiński =

Polish painter (1866–1895)

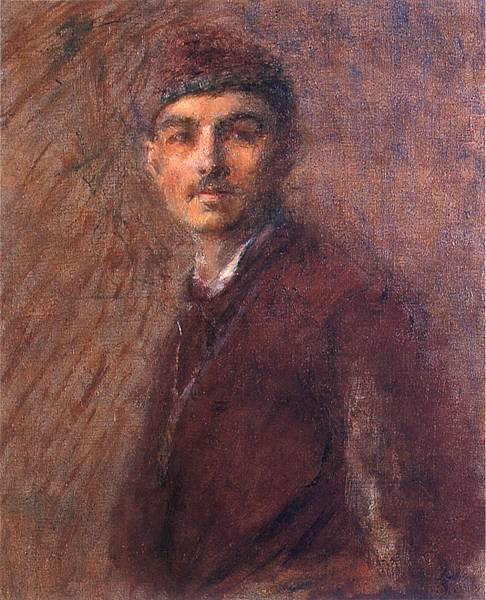
- Self-portrait, 1887 (age 21), from Silesian Museum (Katowice)
- Born: 4 February 1866; Warsaw, Congress Poland
- Died: 5 January 1895 (aged 28); Warsaw, Congress Poland
- Notable work: Frenzy of Exultations (Szał uniesień)

Władysław Podkowiński (Polish: [vwaˈdɨswaf pɔtkɔˈvij̃skʲi]; 4 February 1866 – 5 January 1895) was a Polish master painter and illustrator associated with the Young Poland movement during the Partition period.

== Career ==
Podkowiński was born in Warsaw and began his artistic training at Wojciech Gerson's drawing school, he then transferred to the Warsaw Academy of Fine Arts where he studied between 1880 and 1884. After graduating, Podkowinski began to contribute to many of the leading art journals in Warsaw at the time. In 1885, he travelled, along with Józef Pankiewicz, to the Imperial Academy of Arts where he studied from 1885 to 1886. Returning from St. Petersburg in 1886, Podkowiński obtained a position of an illustrator for the Tygodnik Ilustrowany magazine where he became one its most renowned artists.

His first watercolor and oil paintings were produced during this time, but Podkowiński still considered them personal, not a public endeavor. Those early paintings were mainly influenced by Aleksander Gierymski. He adopted painting as a profession after a trip to Paris in 1889, where he was profoundly influenced by French Impressionist painters including Claude Monet. Podkowiński was later credited for bringing the Impressionist movement to Poland, but toward the end of his life, his failing health inclined him toward Symbolism. He died in Warsaw at the very early age of 28 due to tuberculosis.

His best known painting, Frenzy of Exultations (Szał uniesień), exhibited first in Zachęta, is surrounded by the turn-of-the-century atmosphere of scandal and public outcry. In 1894, it was featured in a Warsaw art exhibition and violently criticized. The exhibition lasted only 36 days because Podkowinski brought a knife on the 37th day, and slashed his work on display. The painting was restored after his death and is prominently exhibited at the Sukiennice Museum in Kraków.

== Selected paintings ==
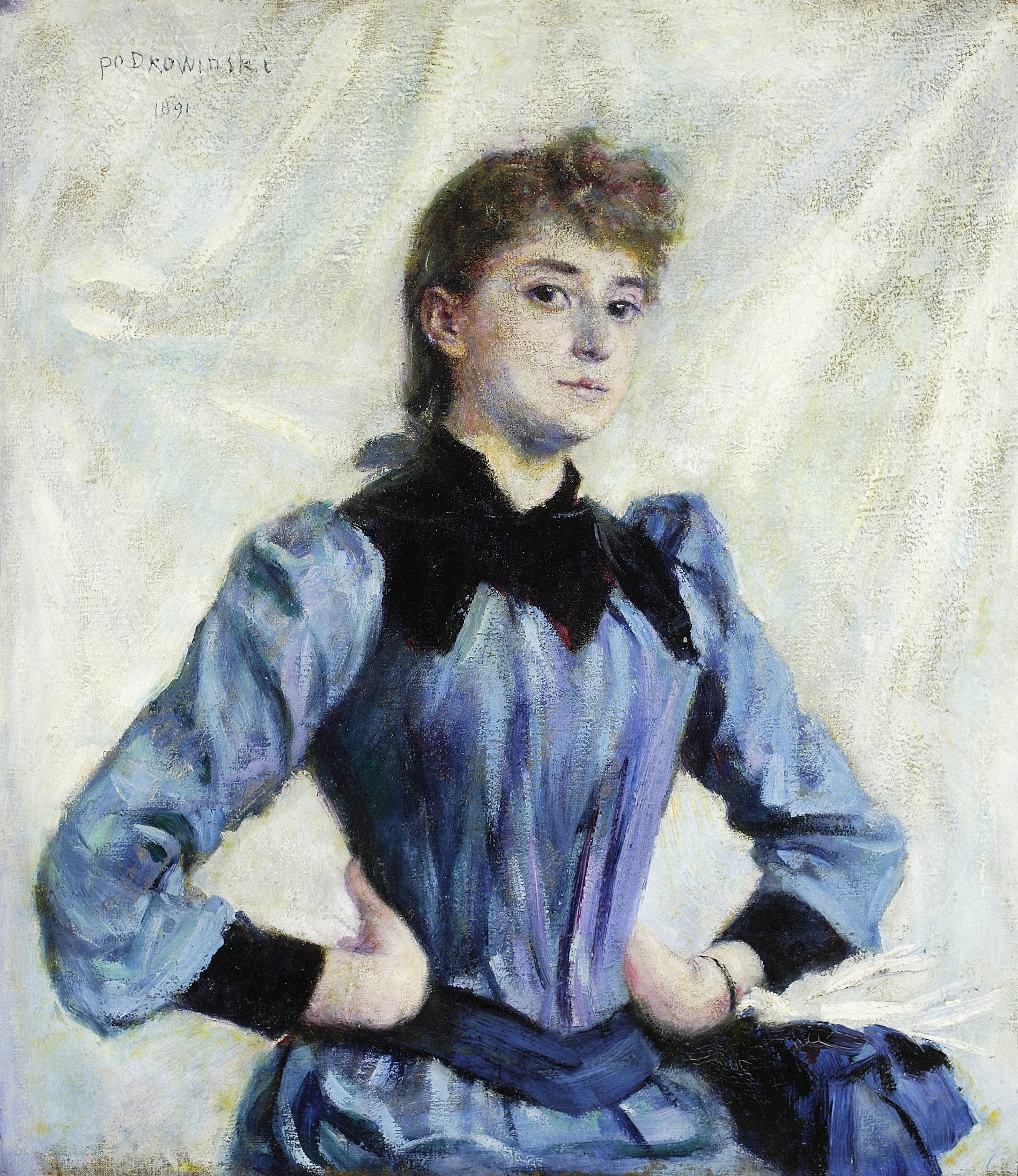
Study of a Blonde, National Museum in Warsaw

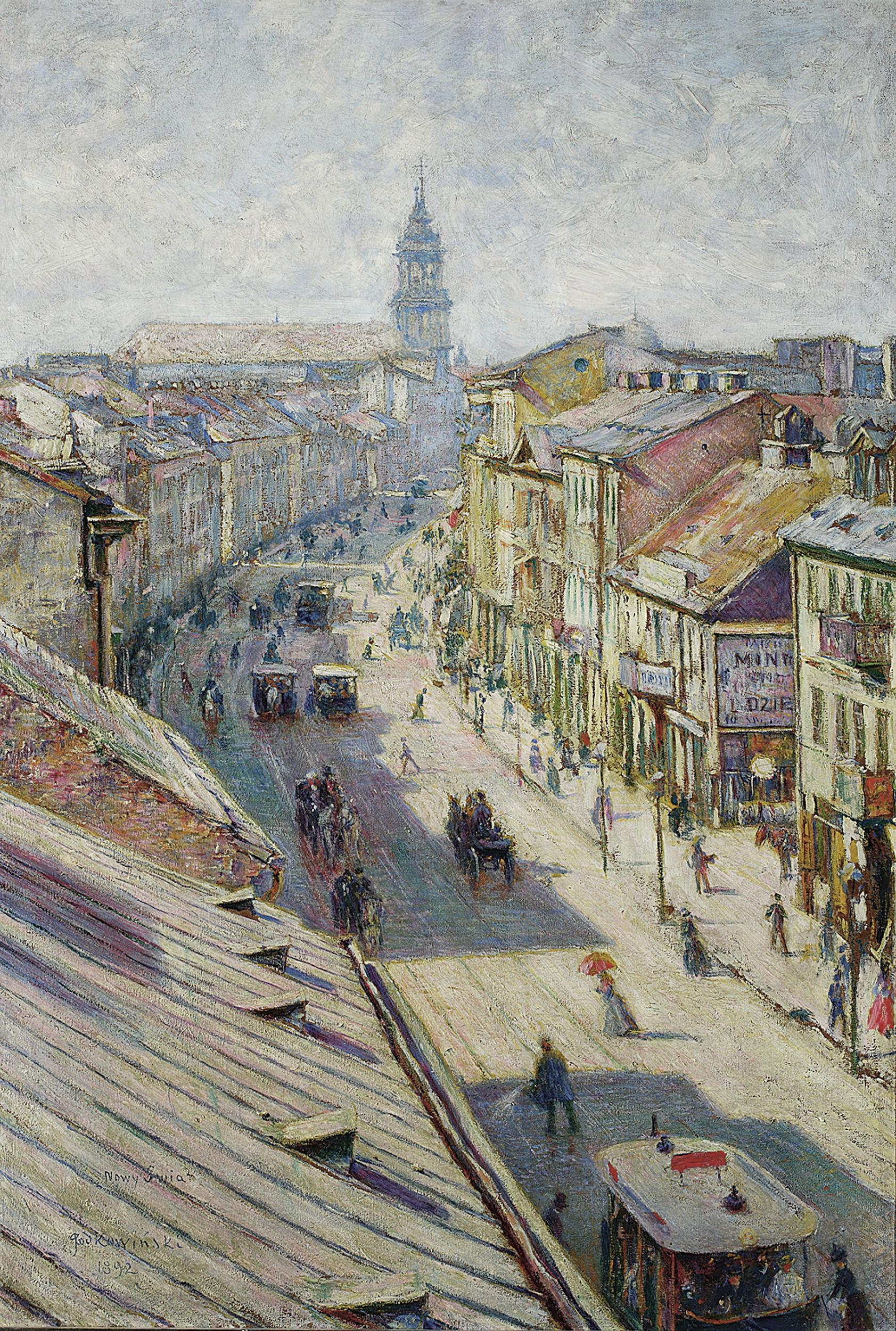
Nowy Świat
on a Summer Day, National Museum in Warsaw

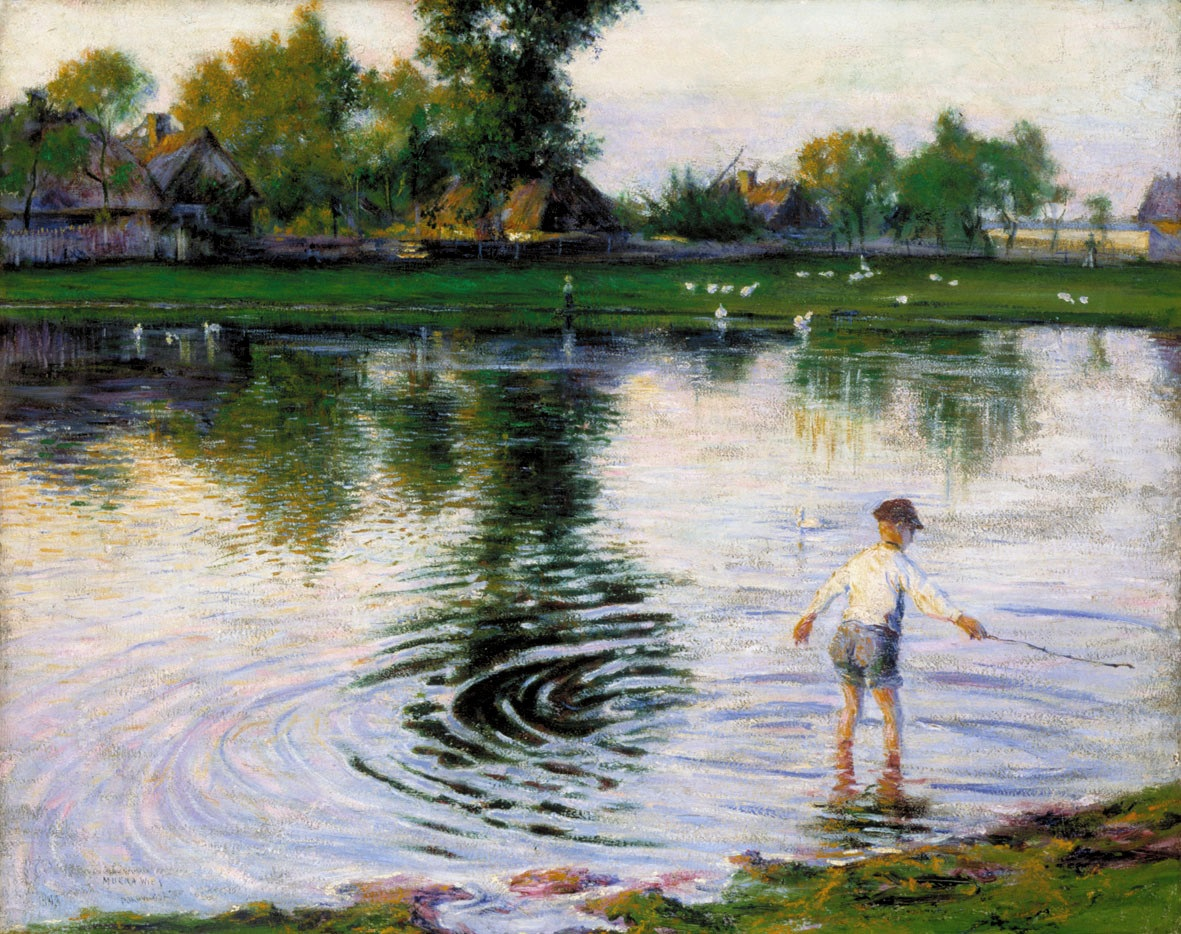
Village by the Water, National Museum in Poznań

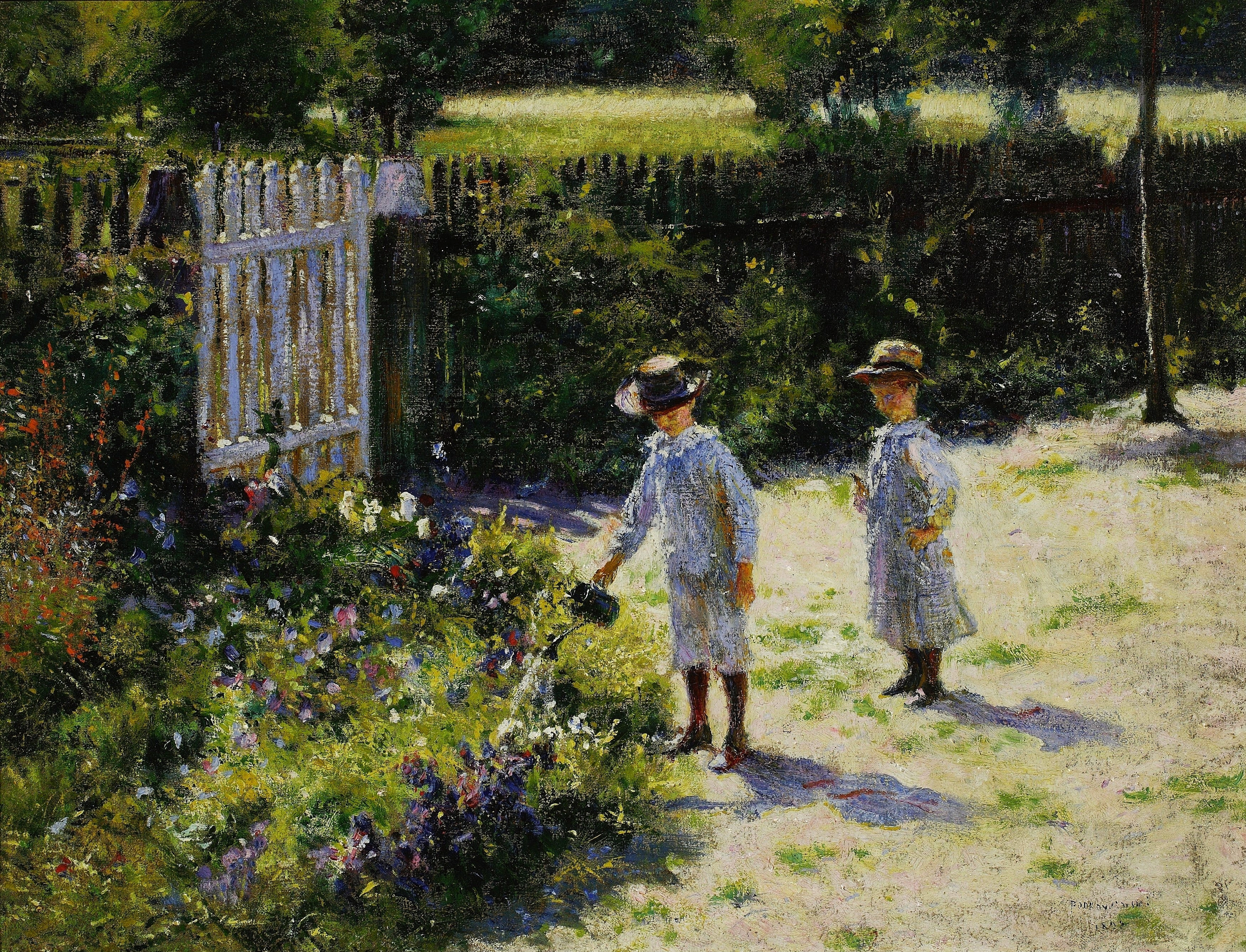
Children in the garden, National Museum in Warsaw

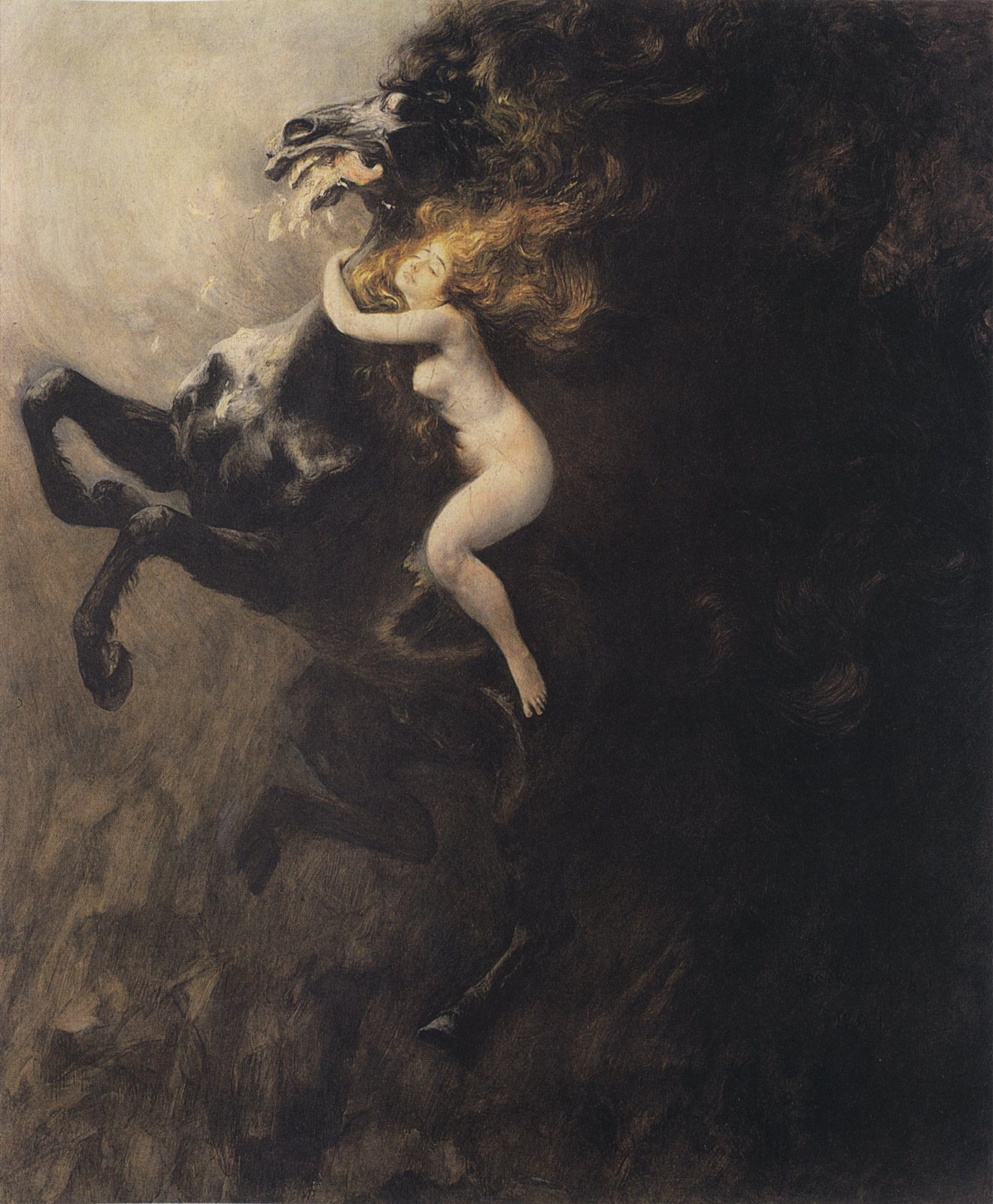
Frenzy of Exultations, National Museum in Kraków

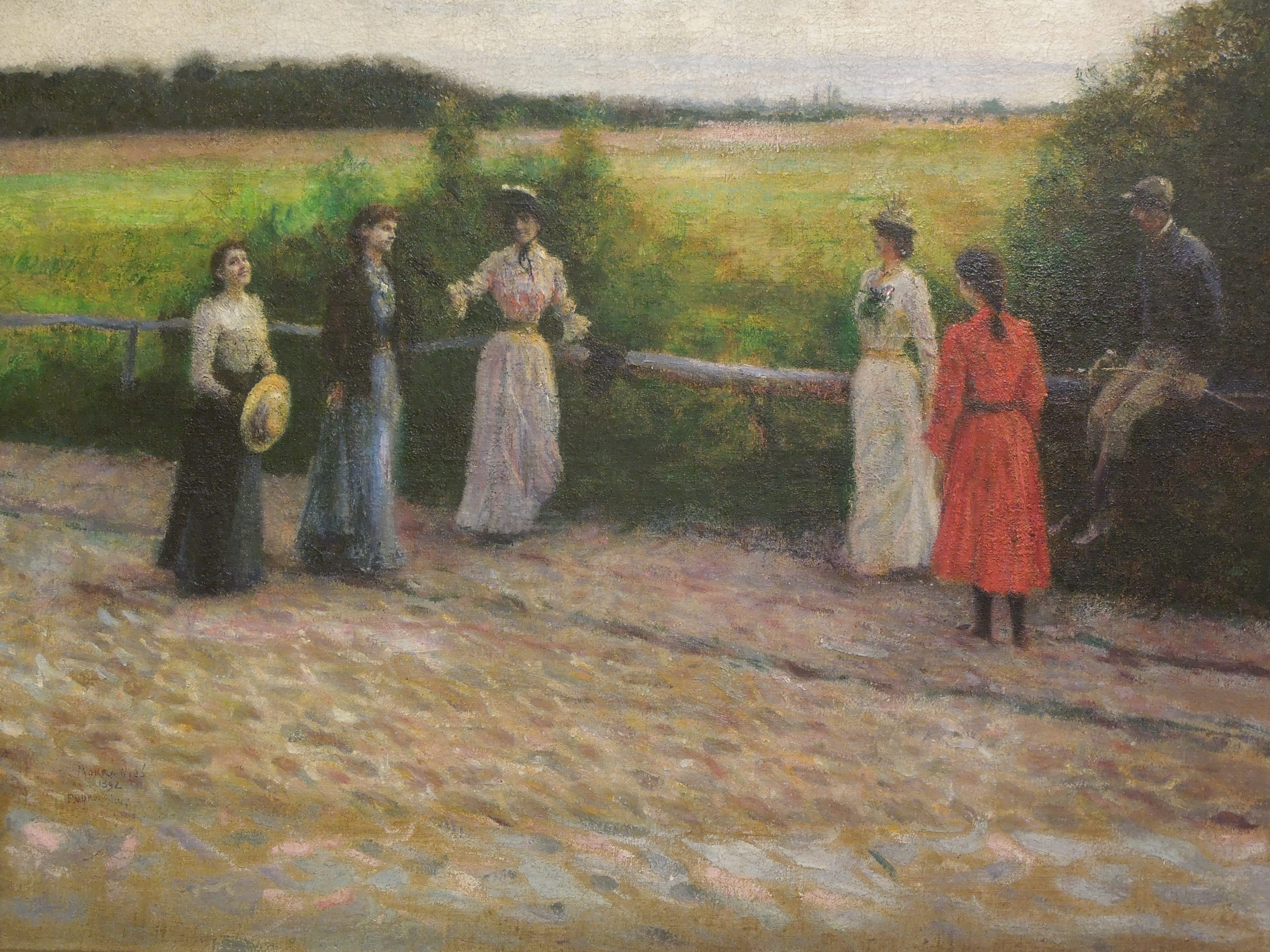
The Encounter, National Museum in Wrocław

== See also ==
- Polish Impressionism
- Young Poland movement
