= Expo 2010 pavilions =

Pavilions at the international exhibition

Coordinates: 31.194118°N 121.486387°E

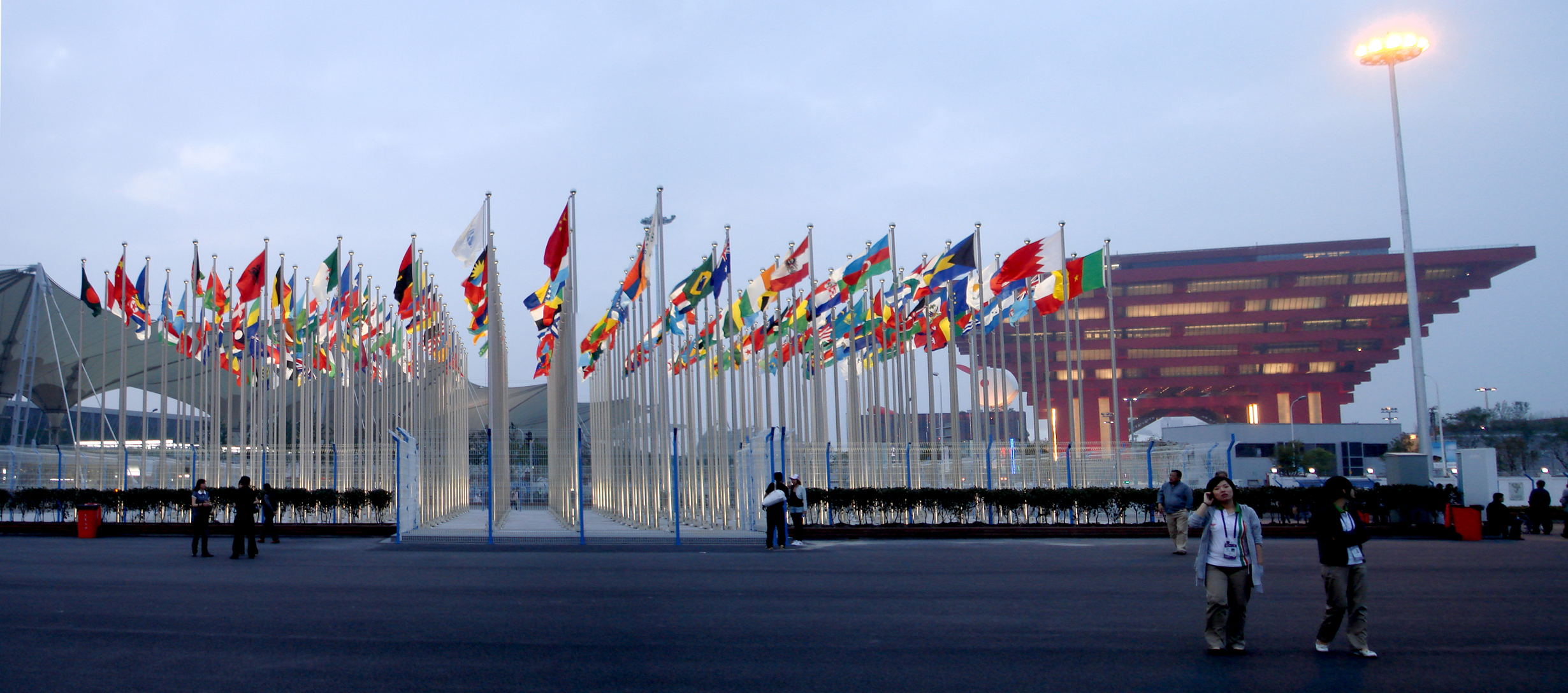
Flags of participating countries fluttering in front of the China pavilion

This article contains the details of the pavilions at Expo 2010. The 2010 World Expo Shanghai is the largest Expo site ever, covering more than 5.2 square kilometers and containing more than 70 exposition pavilions. More than 190 countries and 50 international organizations registered to participate in the 2010 Shanghai Expo. After the six-month run, the Expo had attracted well over 70 million visitors. The Expo 2010 is also the most expensive fair in the history of the World's Fair, with more than 45 billion US dollars invested by the Chinese Government. There were five central theme pavilions at the Expo, each exploring different aspects of urban development.

== Theme pavilions ==
There were five central theme pavilions at the Expo 2010 – Urban Footprint, Urban Planet, Urbanian, City Being, and Urban Future – each exploring different aspects of urban development.

Three of the five theme pavilions were located in the Central Exhibition Building constructed by the host country. Covering an area of 11.5 hectares, it is the largest exhibition structure in the history of World Expositions. The building was located near the Expo Axis, in Zone B. The total exhibition space of this building was 80,000 m^{2}. A 7,000 m^{2} multifunctional room in the building's center had an atrium in which some of the individual pavilions opened. Construction was completed in September 2009 before interior construction began.

=== Urban Planet Pavilion ===
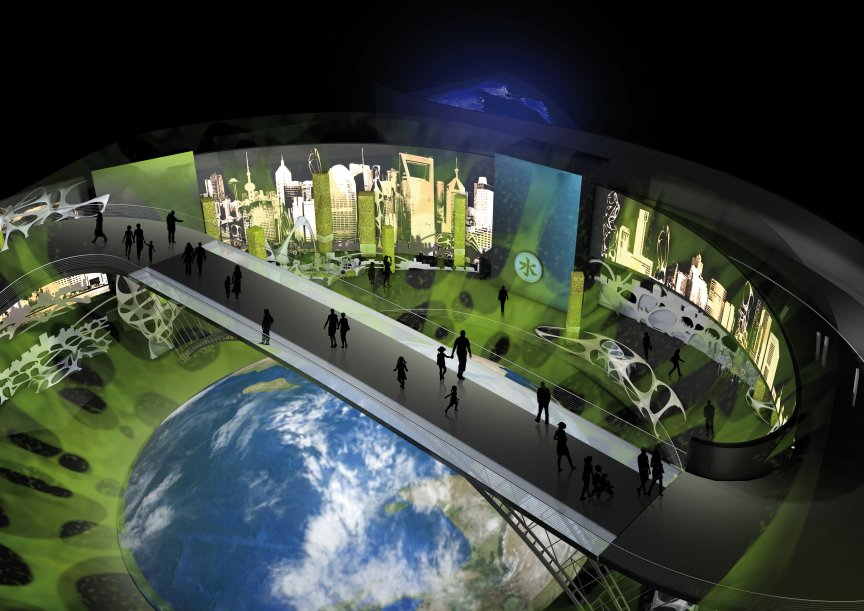
Reaching the highest point of the "Road of Crisis", visitors could look down on the "Blue Planet"; design for the Urban Planet pavilion, November 2008

The Urban Planet Pavilion was located in the central exhibition building on the Expo Axis. The concept and design were contributed by the German communication agency TRIAD Berlin. The company, which had already designed a pavilion for the Expo 2000 in Hanover, won an international bidding contest against more than 150 competitors. TRIAD Berlin was responsible for construction management and the supervision of the artistic aspects of the pavilion.

With its total floor space of 12,000 m^{2}, the Urban Planet pavilion addressed the complex processes marking urbanization. According to its designers, the scenography combined Western forms of artistic expression with ideas from the Chinese Feng shui heritage. The exhibition was characterized by a dichotomous structure illustrating the two-faced character of the city as both a consumer of environment and as a place for innovation and technology in the service of an ecological renewal for the future.

The first part of the exhibition "Road of Crisis" is made of five chapters, each corresponding to the five elements in Wu Xing: Water − Fire − Metal − Wood − Earth. It reflected the potential of destruction emanating from the cities, the threats facing the ecosystem, and the depletion of Earth's natural resources. The second part of the exhibition, "Road of Solution" offered possible approaches to the problems that were expressed.

The pavilion was one of the largest in this Expo 2010. The wide corridors and enormous size of the pavilion were to provide a visit with limited waiting times, compared to other pavilions.

=== Urbanian Pavilion ===
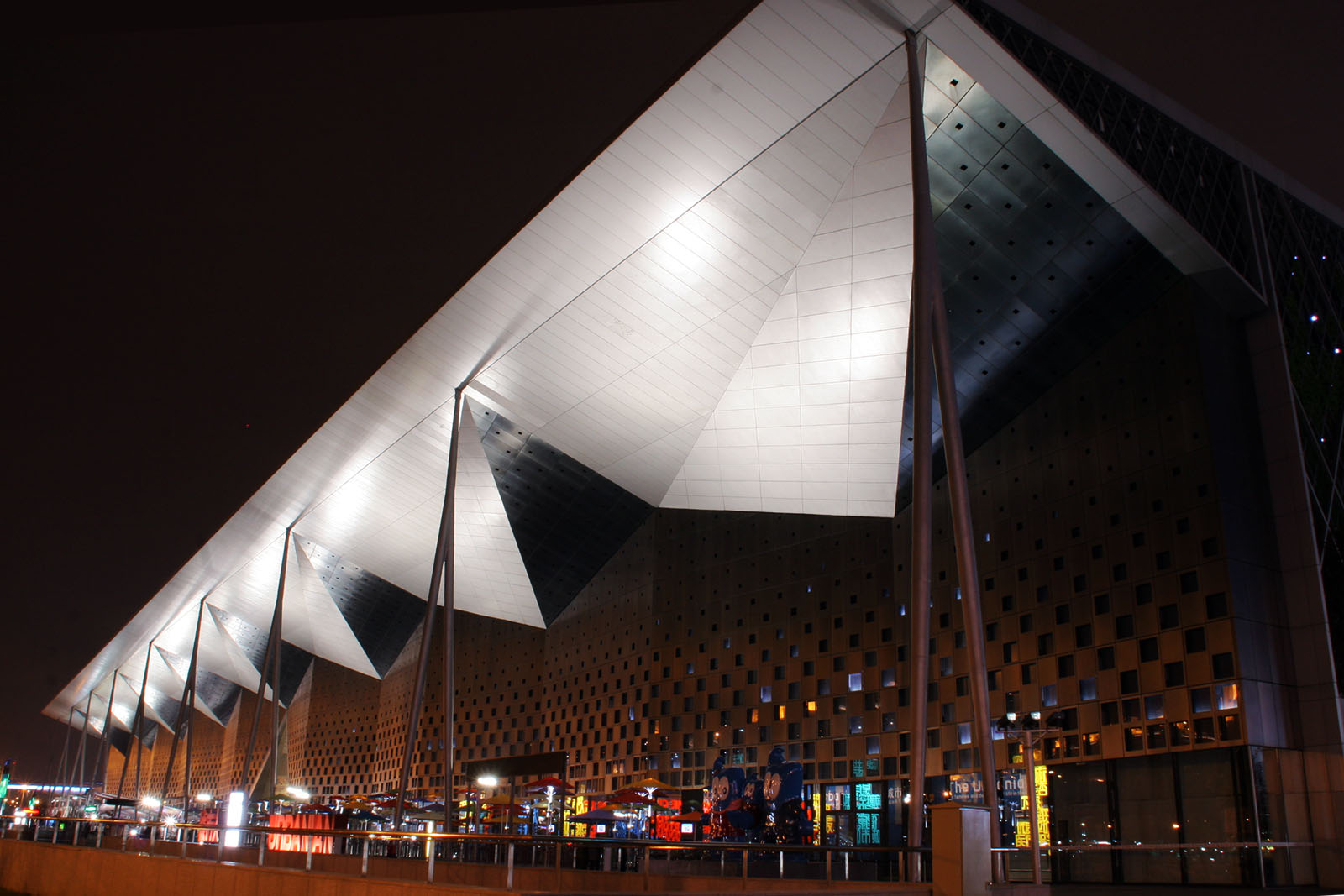
Urbanian Pavilion

The concept for the Urbanian Pavilion was contributed by the Dutch designer Herman Kossmann and focused on residents of modern cities. According to Kossmann, its guiding principle was the awareness that city planners have to address the urgent needs of the residents as "the prerequisite for the city's sustainable development."

Video clips in the exhibition illustrated the stories of six real families, from cities in six continents: Paris (Europe), São Paulo (Latin America), Phoenix, Arizona (North America), Lijiang, Yunnan (Asia), Melbourne (Oceania), and Ouagadougou (Africa). The videos covered different issues – such as family, work, relationship, education, and health – of an average city dweller's life.

=== City Being Pavilion ===
The City Being pavilion is designed by the joint venture of the China Central Academy of Fine Arts and Land Design Studio in London. The exhibition examined the growth of infrastructures of modern cities, presenting the networks of both traffic, water, and energy supply as core elements in an urban setting. The pavilion was located in the Central Exhibition Building on the Expo Axis.

The exhibition included a "Dynamic Station", reminiscent of the architecture of train stations in the early 20th century. Train models from different generations were presented. The "Circular Pipeline" provides visitors into the insights of the underground infrastructures of a city. In the "Soul Square", an 8-minute video clip was shown through a large theater with seven folded screens and a 7000 m^{2} velarium.

=== Urban Footprint Pavilion ===
The concept and design for the Urban Footprint Pavilion were contributed by the Xiao Hui Wang Art Center under the supervision of the Shanghai Museum. The pavilion portrayed the growth of the cities as a decisive factor for human progress over the ages. The pavilion is divided into four exhibition halls, "Ideal Fantasy City", "City Origin", "Urban Development", and "City Wisdom." The main lobby, "Ideal Fantasy City" shows the Western and Eastern characteristics of an ideal city. The pavilion used high-tech installations as well as cultural relics loaned from international museums. The organizers described their concept for the presentation of the city's evolution as "an inspiration for urban development in the future."

=== Urban Future Pavilion ===
The Urban Future pavilion in Zone B. The exhibition was designed by the Spanish agency Ingeniaqued in cooperation with the Chinese artist Bu Hua. The concept involved an imaginary journey into the future, adopting an optimistic view of opportunities for developing habitable cities via a combination of technological progress and tradition.,

Visitors walking through five exhibition rooms found examples of sustainable solutions for urban problems concerning living, traffic, energy supply, and city planning. There were specific references to innovations put into practice in such diverse cities as Beijing, Kōbe, Freiburg im Breisgau, Canberra and San Diego. The tour included an animated movie shown in a 35-meter-high hall which presented a colorful fantasy world.

The pavilion is located in an old renovated manufacturing plant. It is the first building to receive a MOHURD three-star green building certification, equipping many energy and eco-housing technologies such as solar panels, wind turbine, as well as LED lighting.

== National pavilions ==
189 of the world's 196 nations were represented at Expo 2010, either in stand-alone pavilions or within larger pavilions. The three largest national pavilions were the China Pavilion, the Africa Pavilion, and the Pacific Pavilion.

=== Africa Pavilion ===
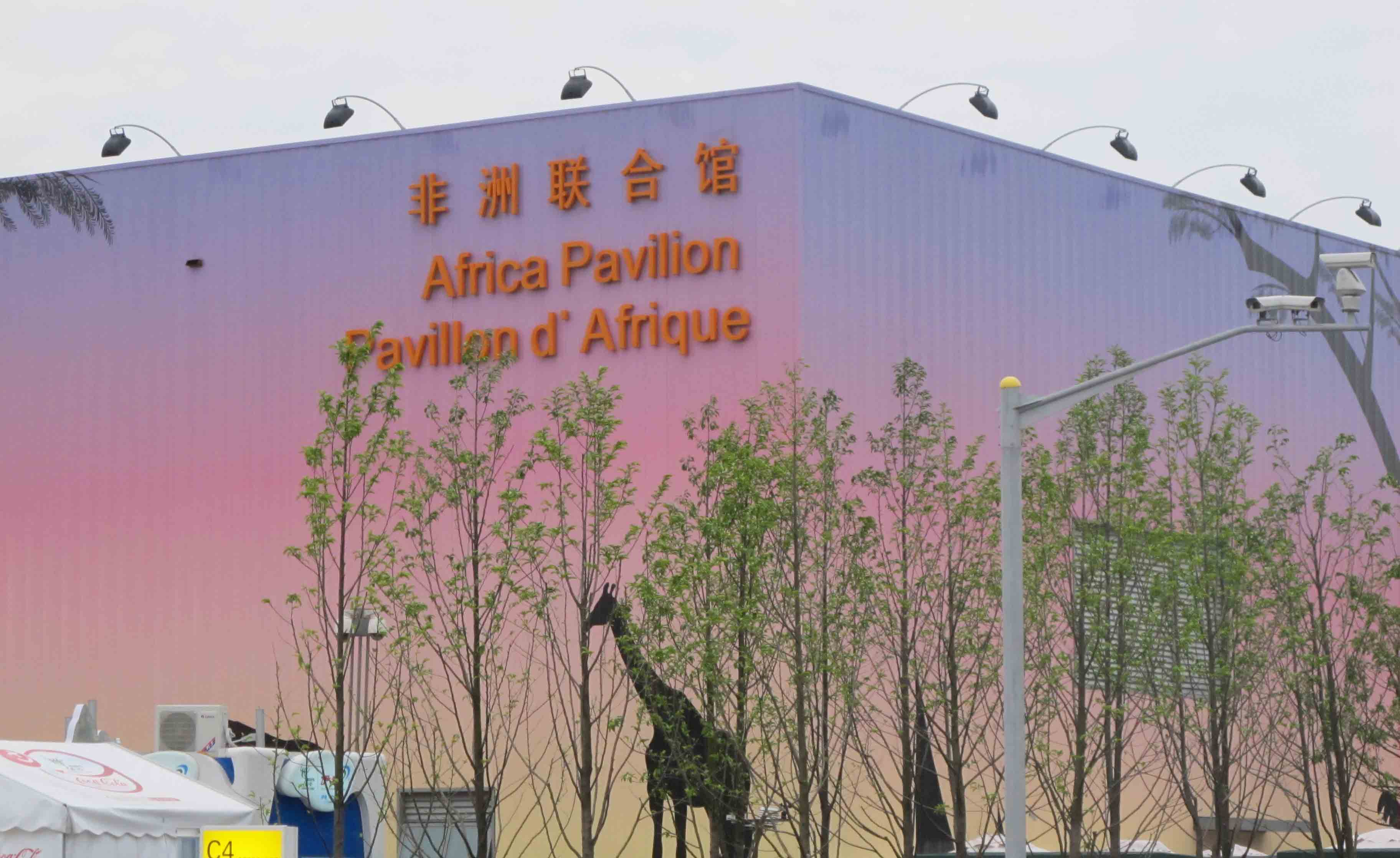
Africa Pavilion

The Africa Pavilion was made up of a joint presentation by 42 nations and 1 organization from Africa.

It received a total of about 23 million visitors during the duration of the Expo.

=== Argentina ===
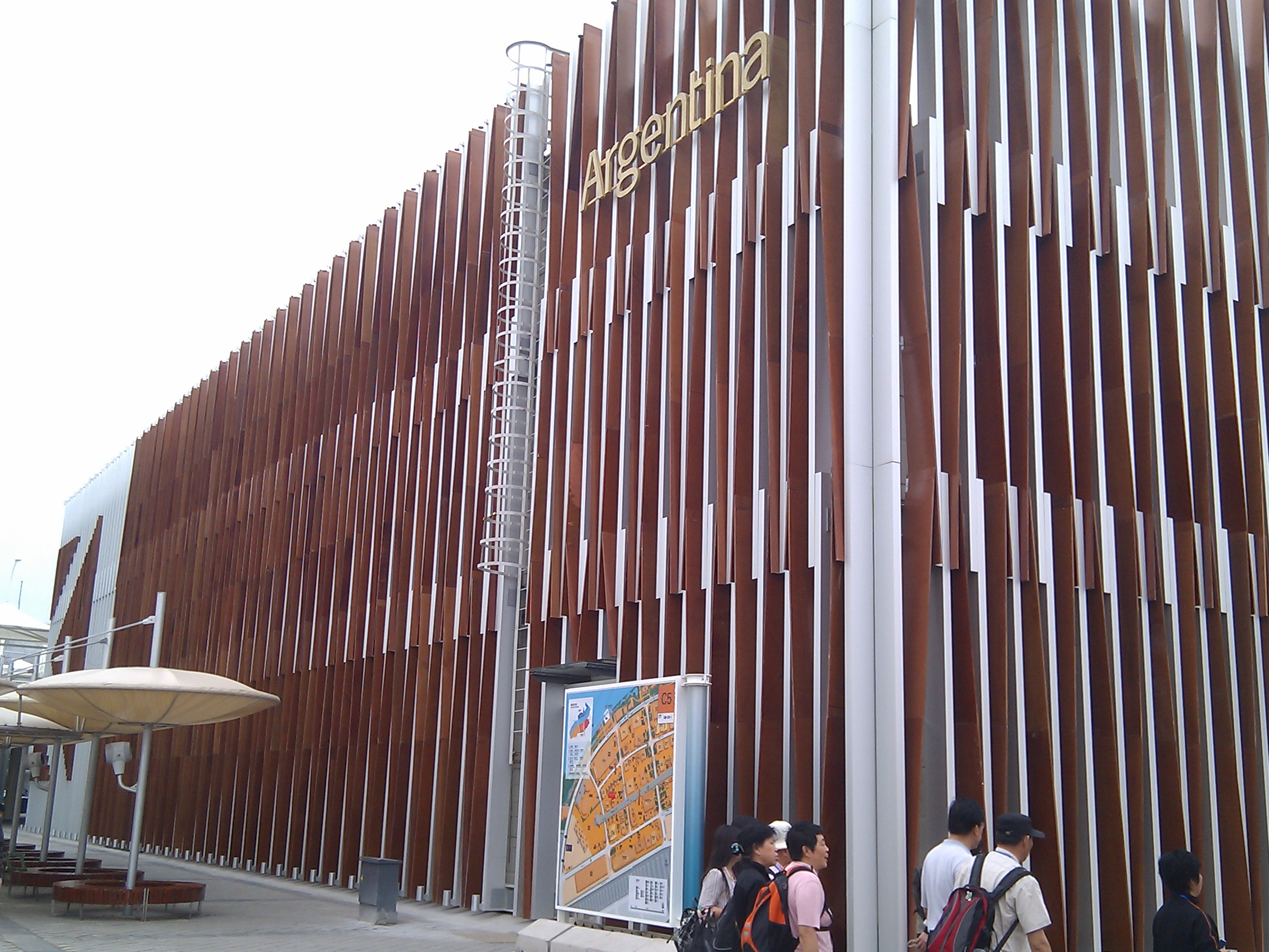
Argentina Pavilion

More than 4 million visits were made to the Argentina Pavilion during the duration of the Expo.

=== Australia ===
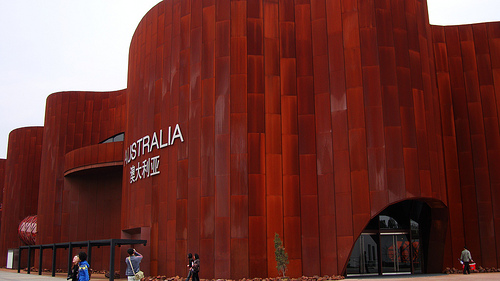
Australia Pavilion

The three-story Australia Pavilion was constructed on a 4,800 m^{2} site and designed by leading Australian architectural firm Wood Marsh in conjunction with creative design firm Think!OTS. The façade of the structure was composed of weathered steel, which oxidized in the months preceding the expo's opening. The red ochre color was meant to represent the "red center" desert regions of central Australia.

The pavilion cost A$83 million, the most Australia has ever allocated for a pavilion in history. A$6 million of the total cost was contributed by the state of Victoria, whose largest foreign trading partner is China.

The mascot of the Australia pavilion was Peng Peng, a kookaburra.

=== Bangladesh ===
The Bangladesh Pavilion was themed as "The Spirit and Growth of Golden Bengal." The pavilion entrance was decorated with colorful traditional Bangladeshi patterns, a sculpture, pictures of Bangladeshi urban areas, and models of traditional architecture. The pavilion mainly emphasized two key features: the national features and the traditional gourmet of Bangladesh.

The pavilion celebrated its pavilion day on September 20 with a performance of traditional singing and dance. News at the website remarked it "Bravo and a big day for the country". The country's performance – "Eternal Bangladesh" was also highly praised.

=== Belgium ===
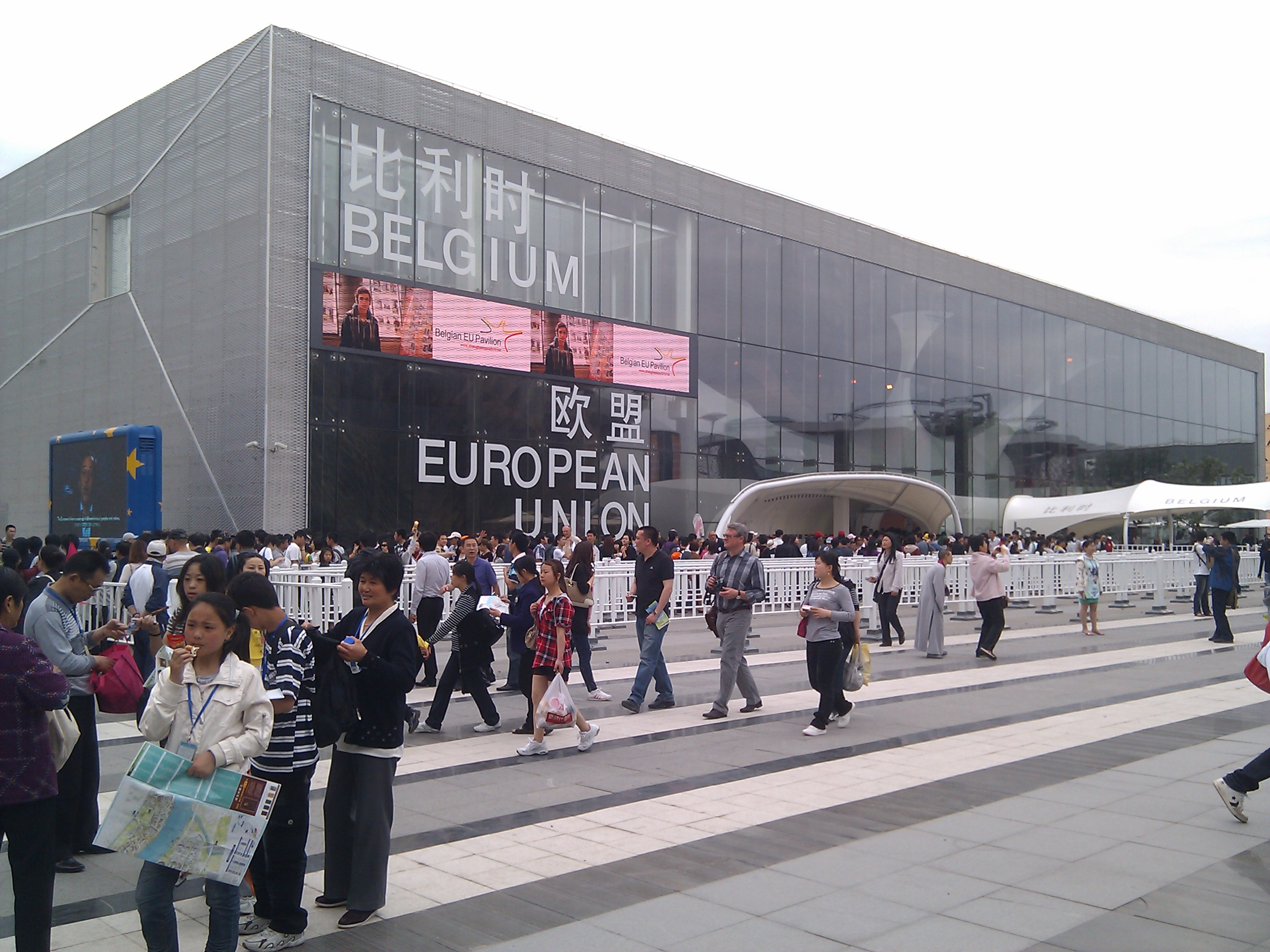
Belgium Pavilion

The Belgium Pavilion received 7 million visitors during the expo. The interior of the pavilion featured a giant model of a brain cell, representing innovation in Belgium. Because Belgium was due to assume the presidency of the European Union in 2010, the pavilion also housed the joint initiatives of the EU. The pavilion was opened by José Manuel Barroso.

Exhibits in the Belgian part of the pavilion included "the Wall of fame" – showing pictures of the most famous Belgians; "the Wall of Smurfs," and a solar car. There was also a shopping area inside the pavilion which mainly sold chocolate by Godiva, Neuhaus and Guylian.

The second floor housed a restaurant that served typical Belgian dishes, like waterzooi, a dish of sausage with mashed potatoes and fries. There was also a take-out service outside the pavilion, selling Belgian specialty food such as French fries, Belgian ice cream, and Belgian waffles.

=== Brunei ===
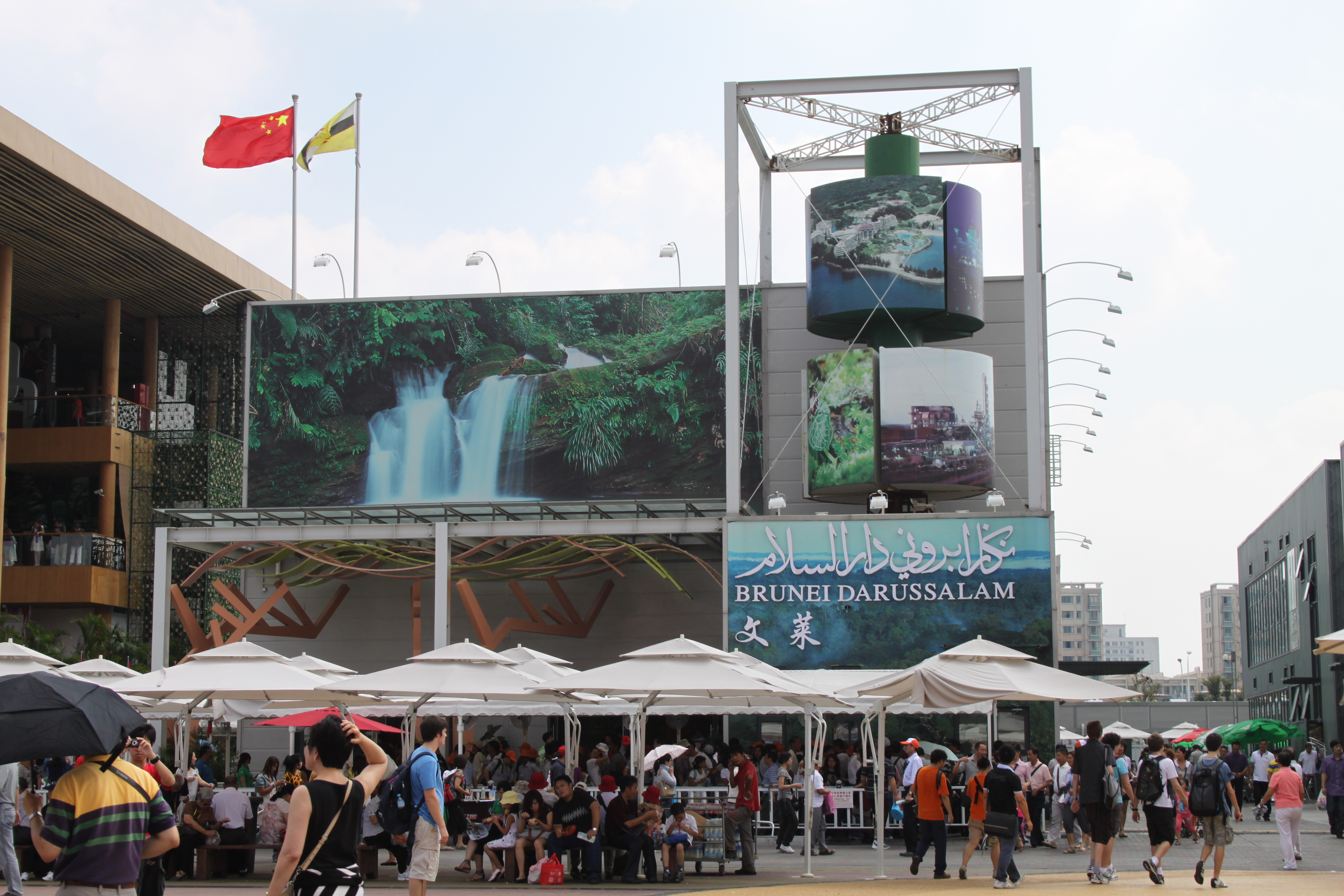
Brunei Pavilion

The 1,000 m^{2} Brunei Pavilion was themed "Now for the Future". It opened to the public on May 8, 2010, one week after the opening of the Expo. The interior design mainly consisted of vertical, revolving patterns which symbolized development and the improvement of the lives of Brunei's citizens. The pavilion featured a pathway through the rainforest of Borneo and emphasized efforts to protect Brunei's environment and culture. A 4-D theater introduced attendees to Brunei using recreated rainwater, wind, sound and video.

The pavilion presented Bruneian cuisine and local food brands throughout the Expo. The Brunei Ministry of Foreign Affairs and Trade hired Royal Brunei Catering (RBC), the largest catering firm in the country, to create a monthly rotating list of halal certified local foods for pavilion visitors. Local drinks offered included teh tarik mixed with "Gula Angau" – local sugar and tongkat ali, which consists of boiled long jack root mixed with coffee. Cuisine elements served included Brunei fried noodles, nasi lemak, dim sum, and murtabak.

=== Canada ===
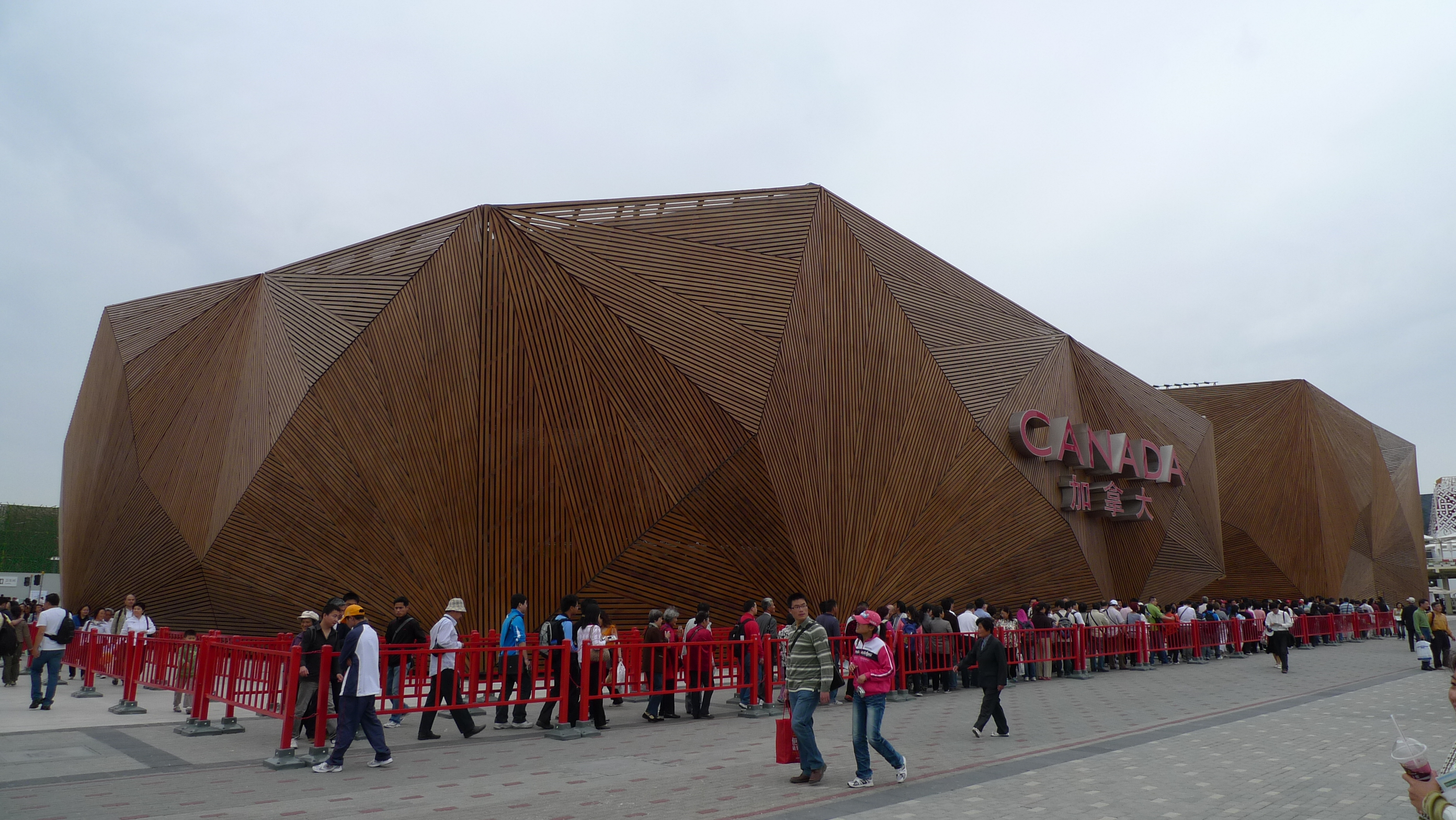
Canadian pavilion

The 6,000 m^{2} Canada Pavilion featured an exhibition themed "The Living City: Inclusive, Sustainable, Creative". The pavilion was expected to receive up to 5.5 million people or 30,000 visitors per day, during the six-month Expo period. Canada hired Mark Rowswell, (known as Dashan in China), to be the pavilion's general manager.

The overall budget for the Canadian pavilion was 45 million Canadian dollars (US$43.57 million). Cirque du Soleil designed the concept for the pavilion and also created public performances, organized cultural programs and developed strategic corporate alliances for the pavilion. The exterior of the pavilion was covered in polished steel and cedar. The pavilion was anchored by an open public square and surrounded by three large, wooden, curved structures. The square was a performing area, with performances by Cirque du Soleil. Part of the pavilion's exterior walls were covered by a special kind of greenery and rainwater was collected by a drainage system for use inside the pavilion.

The Canadian pavilion featured the National Film Board of Canada film Glimpses/Impressions, depicting a day in the life of a composite Canadian city. Directed by Jean-François Pouliot, Glimpses was created with over 3,000 animated photos projected onto a large screen with a 150-degree curve.

A restaurant in the pavilion served Moosehead Beer and poutine. A corporate boardroom was constructed by Bombardier Inc., and a V.I.P. suite for business dealings was sponsored by the Power Corporation of Canada.

Canada was the first country to sign a contract agreeing to open an exhibition at Expo 2010.

=== Chile ===
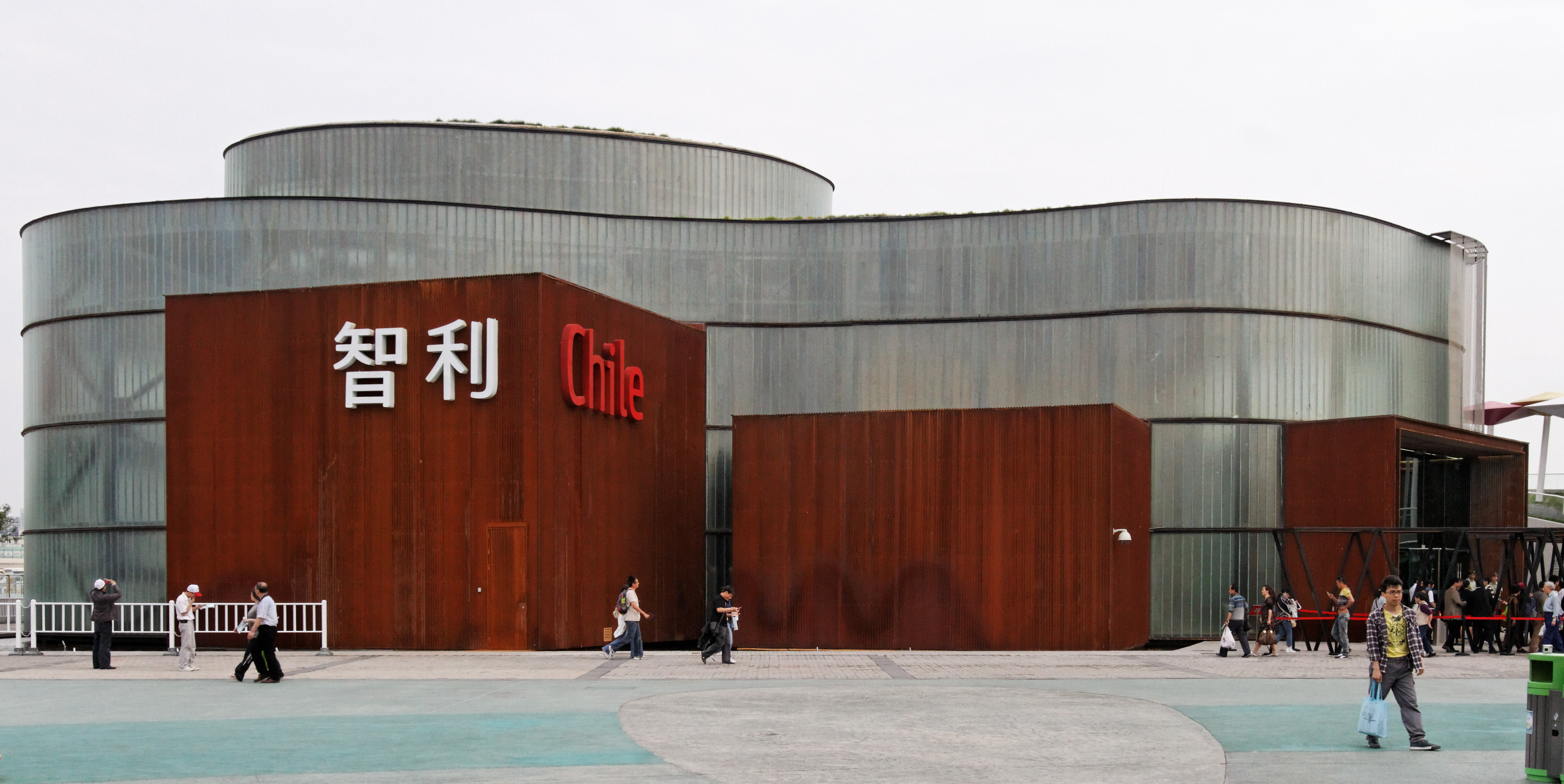
Chile Pavilion

The Chile Pavilion, also known as the "Sprout of a New City", was located in Area C and occupied approximately 2,000 m^{2}.

=== China ===
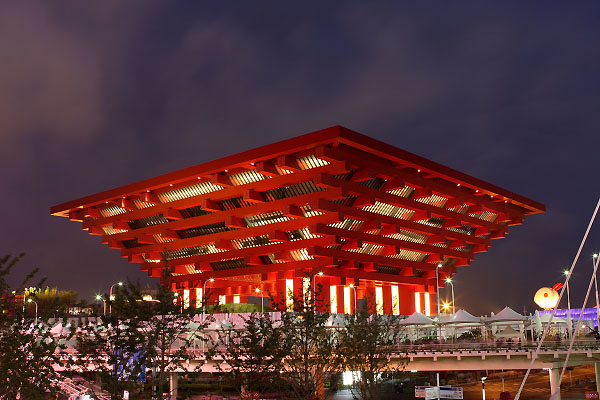
Chinese pavilion

The China Pavilion was the largest national pavilion at the Expo with a footprint of more than 71,000 m^{2} and a gross floor area in excess of 160,000 m^{2}. It is also the most expensive pavilion, costing an estimated US$220 million. The building is located halfway along the Expo Axis on its eastern side in Zone A of the Expo Park. The pavilion lay directly to the east of the Theme Pavilions and to the north of the Hong Kong and Macau pavilions.

The chief architect of the pavilion was He Jingtang, the director of the Architectural Academy of the South China University of Technology. The 63-meter high pavilion, the tallest structure at the Expo, is dubbed "The Oriental Crown" because of its resemblance to an ancient Chinese crown. The architectonic feature of the building was inspired by traditional Chinese roof brackets known as dougong which date back nearly 2,000 years. The exterior is painted in various shades of Chinese red, symbolising Chinese culture and good fortune.

The structure was built with a strong emphasis on sustainable and energy-saving practices with the exterior offering thermal insulation and natural ventilation. The inverted pyramid design and the lower courtyard offers a large overhang for shading. The environmentally friendly roof design allows rainwater harvesting and is decorated with Chinese-style landscaping.

The theme of the pavilion during the Expo was "Chinese Wisdom in Urban Development". The pavilion display was divided into three parts starting from the top of the building and finishing at the bottom.

- Exploring the Oriental Footprint: This first part highlighted the wisdom of Chinese urban practices in Chinese history, from the achievements of China's reforms in the late 1970s to the urban experiences of Imperial China. Among the highlights were two films exploring the developments in the lives of ordinary Chinese in the last 30 years, an animation of the famous painting "Riverside Scene at Qingming Festival" projected onto a huge screen, and the display of a four-horse chariot from the Terracotta Army.
- The Experience Trip: Excursion trains provided a journey exploring urban wisdom in modern and present times, with a track that followed close by for wheelchair users to share the experience.
- Focus on a Lower Carbon Future: An exploration of a lower carbon future in China.

Unlike most of the other pavilions, the China pavilion along with the theme pavilions, Expo Cultural Center and the Expo Axis were not dismantled following the Expo. On 1 October 2012, the China pavilion was reopened as the China Art Museum.

=== China's joint provincial pavilion ===
China's Joint Provincial Pavilion was a large box-shaped building located underneath the China Pavilion. It housed the individual pavilion stalls of every one of China provinces, municipalities and autonomous regions. In all there were 31 pavilions. Although each pavilion is relatively small in size, all were elaborately designed with cultural and architectural qualities unique to each province. For example, the exterior of the Heilongjiang Pavilion resembled blocks of ice, alluding to the extremely cold environment of the province, while the Guizhou pavilion strongly emphasised silver head decorations, displaying special folk characteristics.

=== Colombia ===
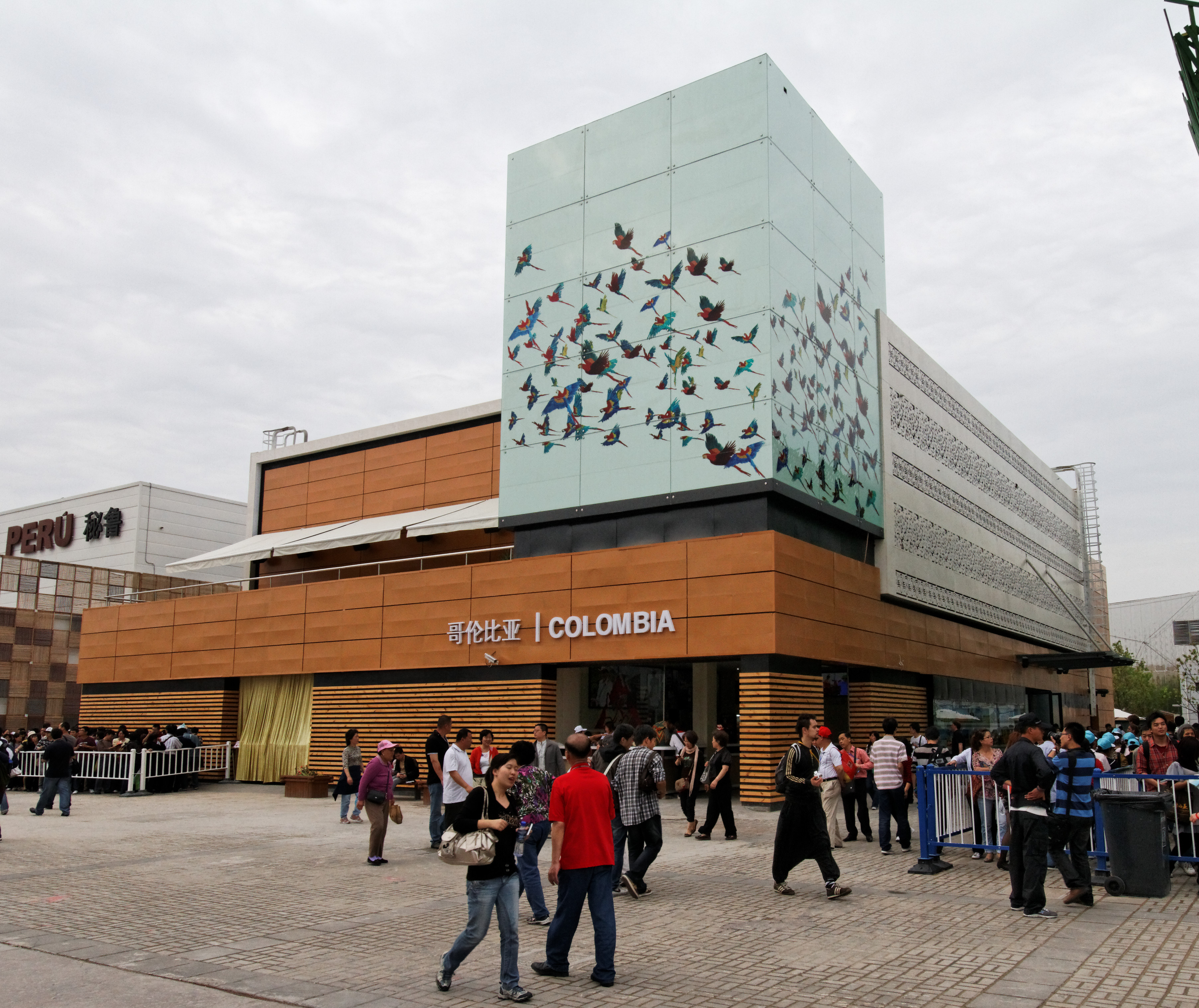
Colombia Pavilion

The Colombia Pavilion which was located in Area C of the Expo was designed by Colombian architects Alejandro Puentes and Esteban Castro from the firm 4H. The concept divided the building into three elements. The base was a glass wall imprinted with a series of pictures showing landscapes, people and city developments. The body of the building was in the form of laser-cut PVC panels showing Tumaco's fabric stamps to celebrate their harmonic relationship with the environment. The third part was a lighthouse, landmark and a glowing tower displaying a flock of parrots recalling the colors of the Colombian flag.

=== Denmark ===
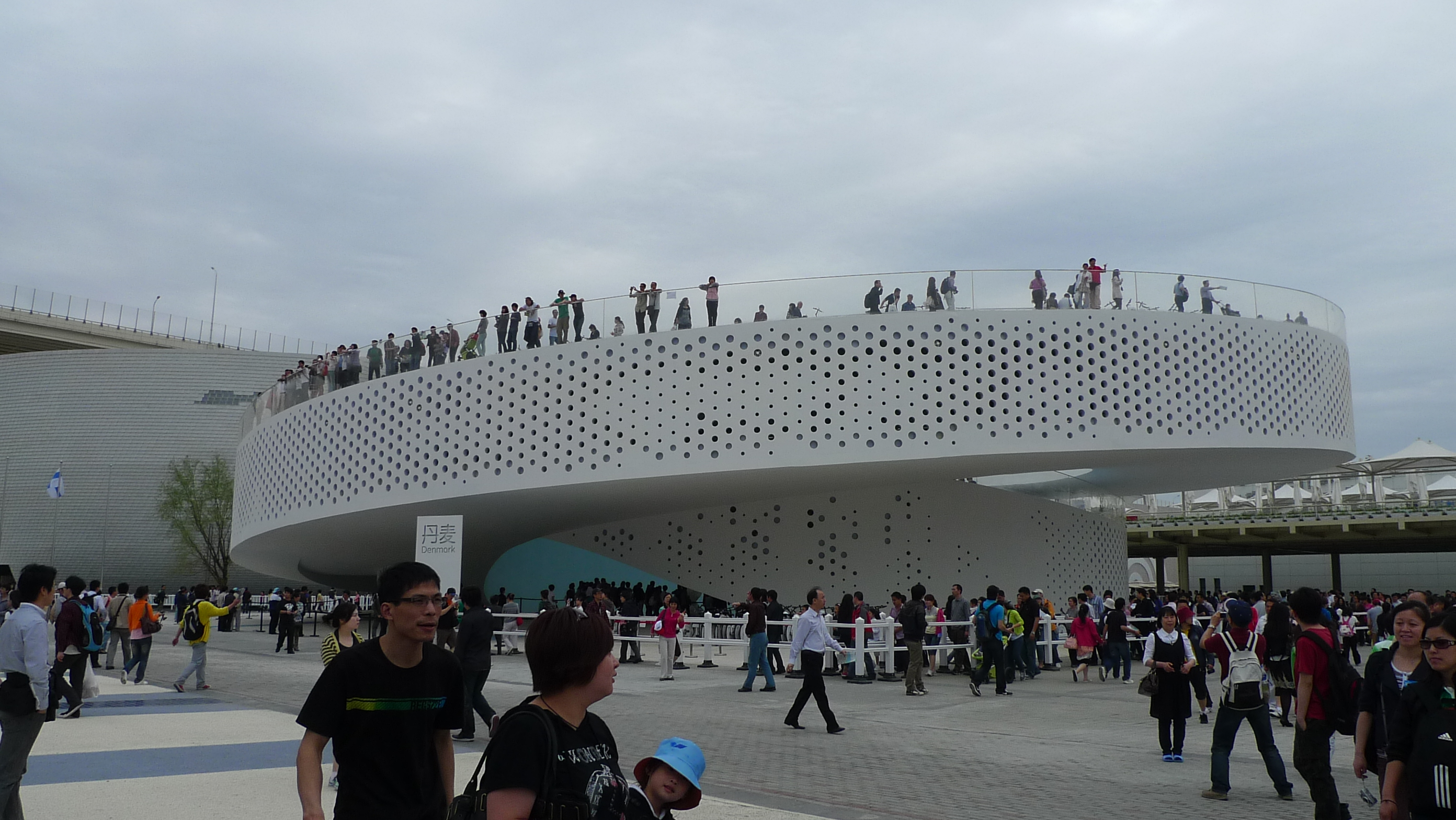
Danish Pavilion

The Denmark Pavilion designed by Bjarke Ingels Group showcased sustainability and energy solutions along with unique Danish architecture and design.

The pavilion's centerpiece was The Little Mermaid, marking the first time that the iconic statue had left Copenhagen. The Little Mermaid was displayed in the center of an artificial pond within the pavilion. The original plans for the exhibit called for seawater from Copenhagen's harbor to be transported, but that idea was dropped because the water would have turned rotten by the time it had reached Shanghai. The intention of transporting the seawater with the statue was to give a more authentic experience to spectators. The pavilion and Little Mermaid statue were unveiled on 25 April 2010, accompanied by a performance by singer Thomas Helmig, who performed a song called Swim, written expressly for the statue's debut. Denmark's Tax Minister Troels Lund Poulsen also delivered a speech to mark the opening of the pavilion.

According to the official site, the pavilion welcomed its 4 millionth visitor on September 12, 2010, and on October 30, 2010, it welcomed its 5.55 millionth visitor, matching the population of Denmark.

=== Egypt ===
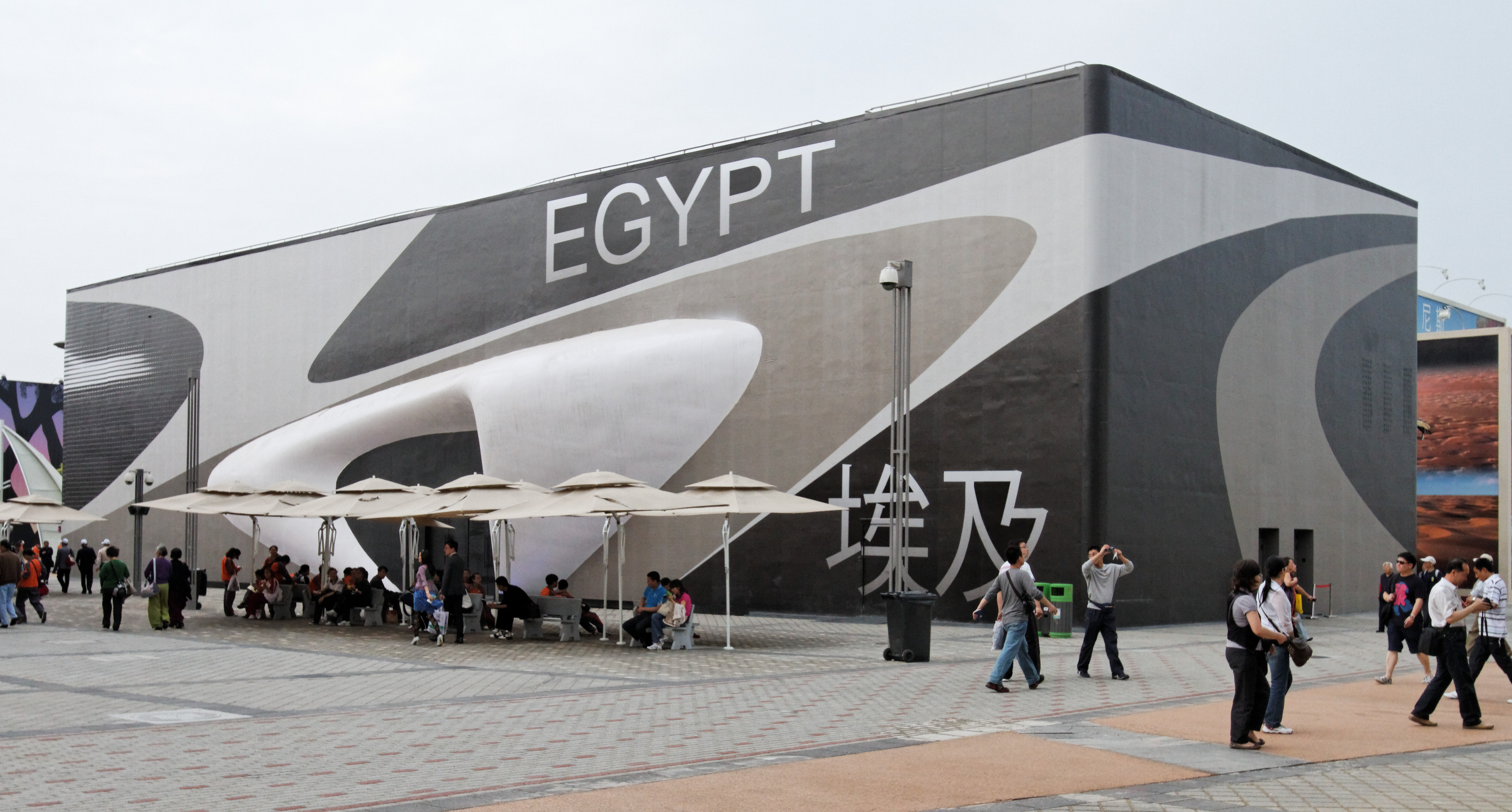
Egypt Pavilion

The Egypt Pavilion was located in Area C. Egypt's 1,000-square-meter pavilion was designed as a gift by Iraqi architect Zaha Hadid. A bit stark with swirling black and white swooshes, it is apparently meant to combine modernity with antiquity, represented by the constellation-like graphic of three pyramids above the arched entrance.

=== Finland ===
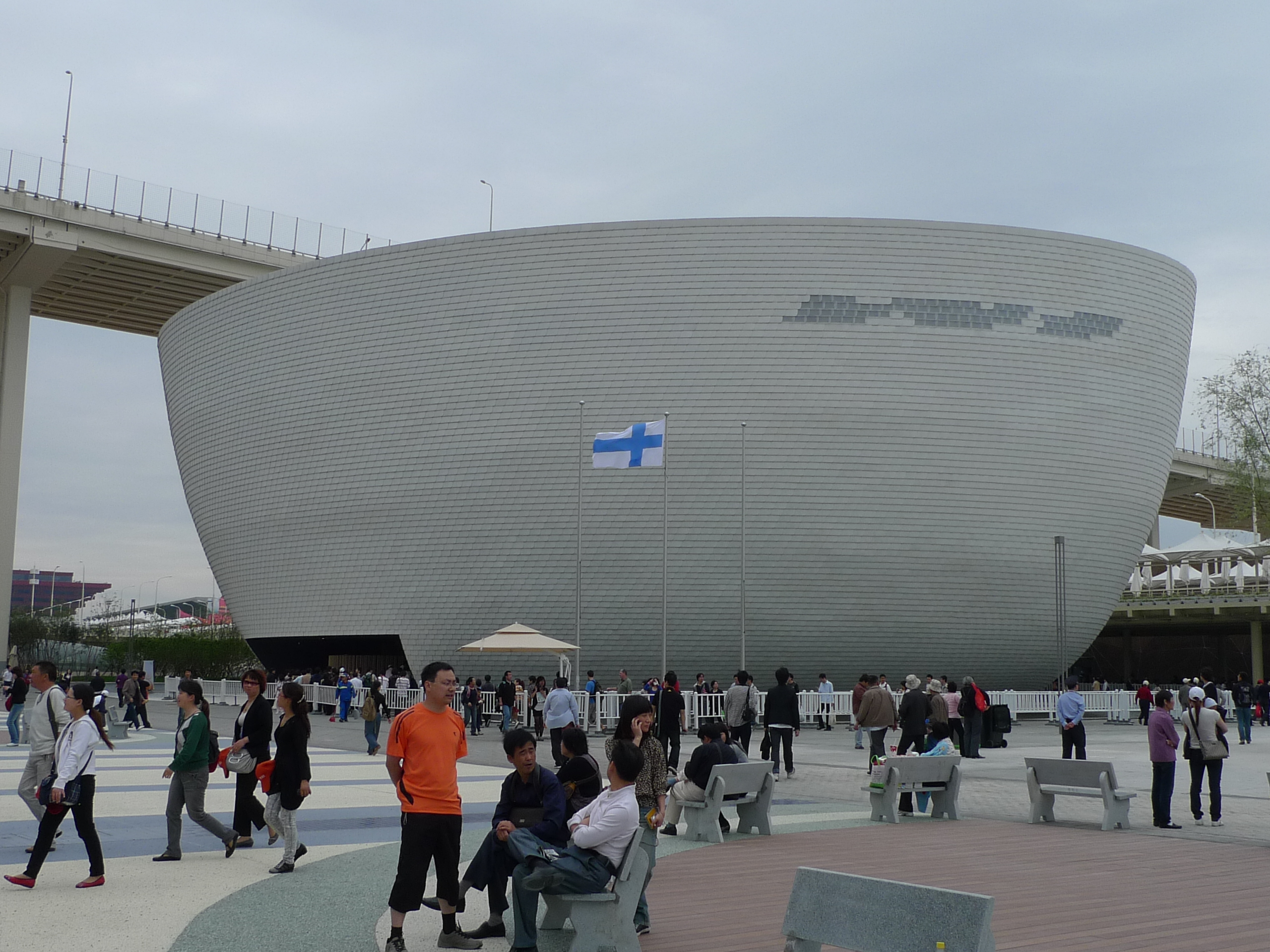
Finland Pavilion

The original name of Finland Pavilion was Kirnu – a Giant's kettle. The pavilion was a feat of Finnish design and showcased Finnish nature and society. Finland wanted to build the Finnish pavilion at the Shanghai EXPO 2010 as ecologically as possible. The main planning work for the pavilion was done in Finland, while the Chinese handled the construction in Shanghai. The pavilion featured a large video installation (70 meters × 7½ meters) designed by artist Jaana Partanen and architect Heikki Lamusuo as well as a unique elevator named 'Lantern', specially designed by KONE

=== France ===
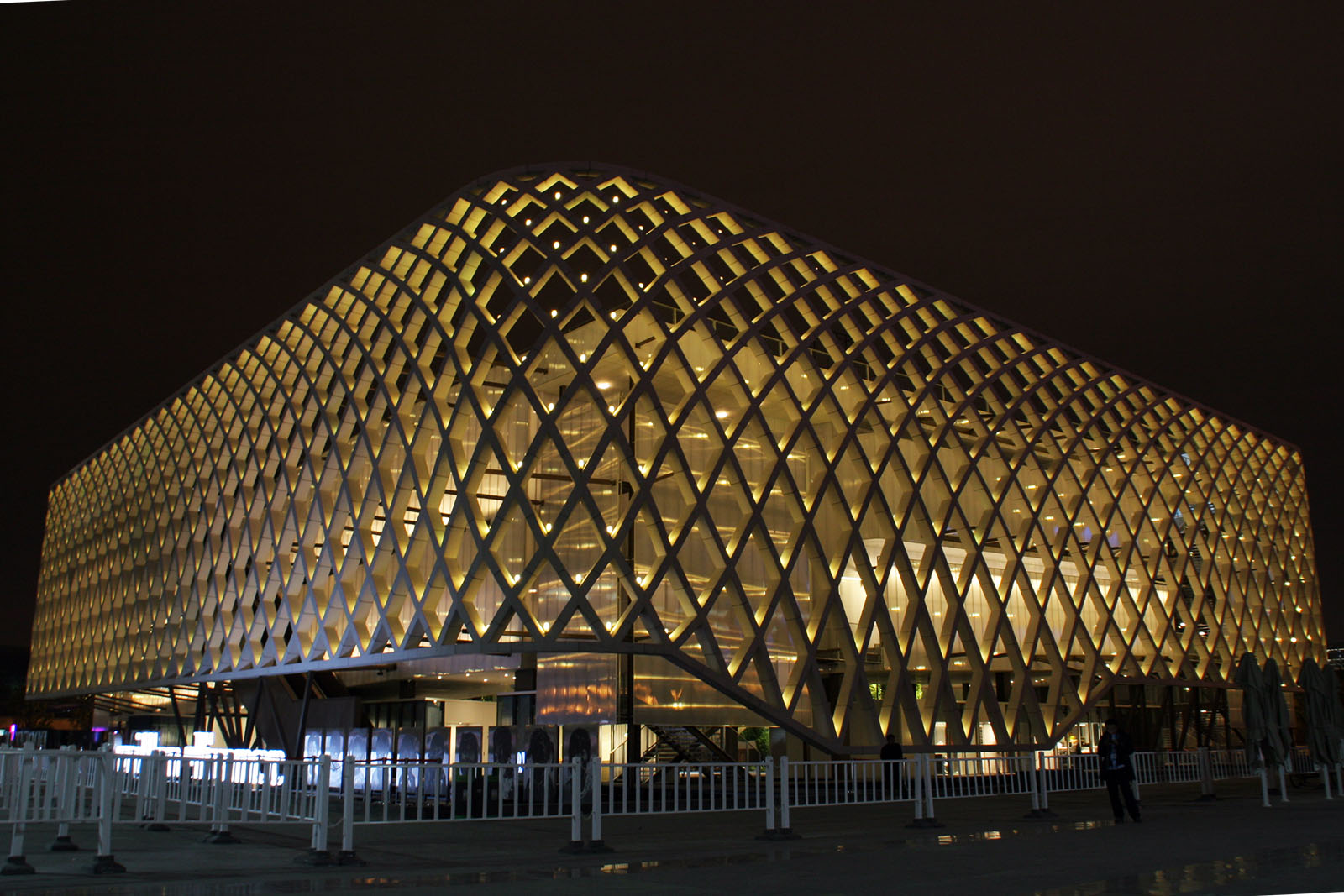
France Pavilion

The France Pavilion featured six paintings and one sculpture on loan from the Musée d'Orsay. The paintings included works by Paul Cézanne, Jean-François Millet, Édouard Manet, Vincent van Gogh, and Paul Gauguin, while the sculpture was Auguste Rodin's The Age of Bronze.

The Age of Bronze had previously been displayed at the Exposition Universelle in 1889 and the 1900 Paris Expo. The Angélus, by Jean-François Millet, was also shown at the 1867 Expo in Paris.

The French pavilion won 3rd prize for best development of theme in the pavilion, a prize category for pavilions at the expo.

=== Germany ===
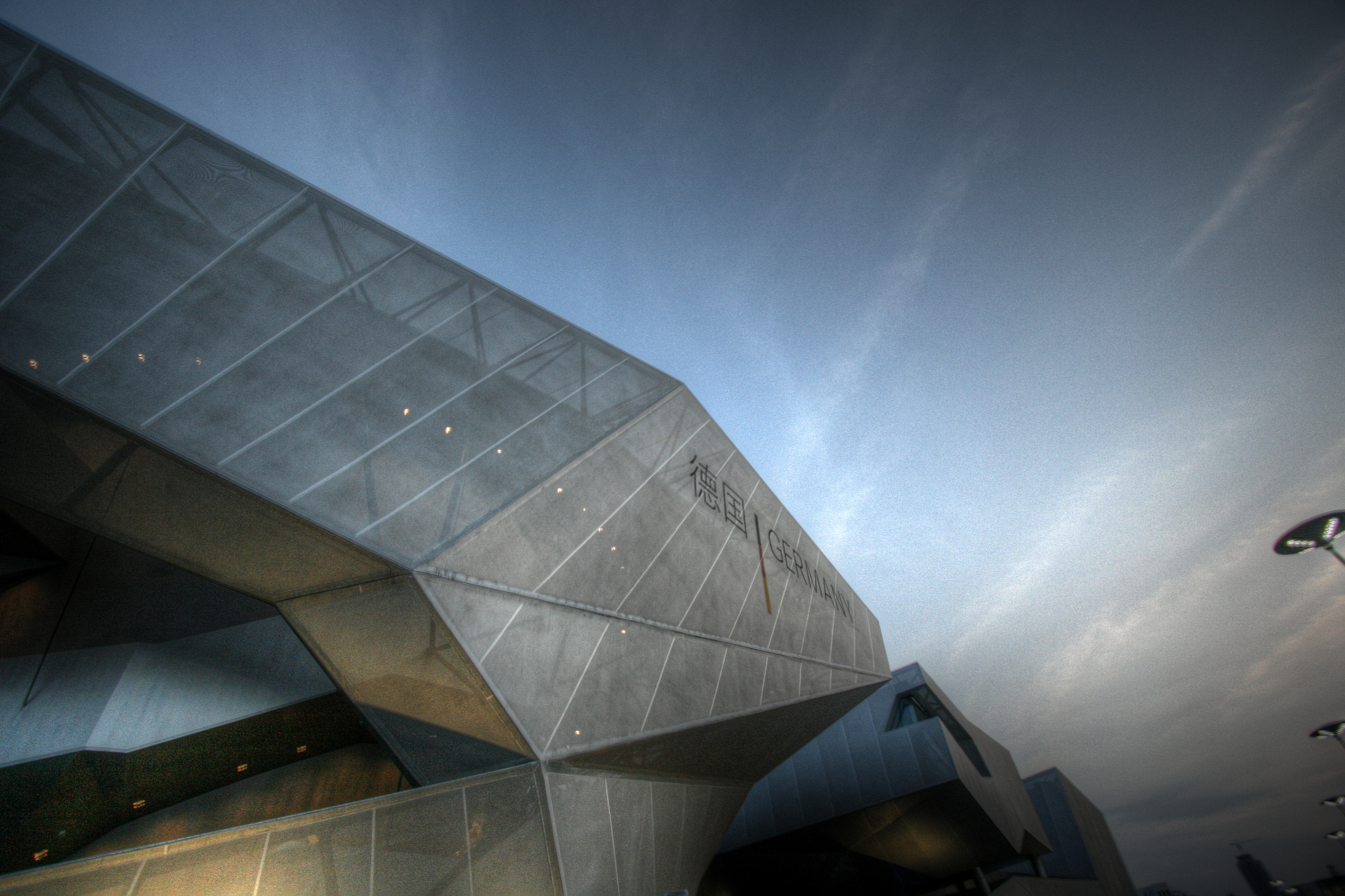
Germany pavilion

The 6000 m^{2}, Germany Pavilion was located in Zone C of the expo. The pavilion was themed "Balancity" – a portmanteau word created from two previously existing words, balance and city – representing a balance between modernization and preservation.

The centerpiece of the pavilion was a massive LED swinging ball that interacted in turn with the volume of the audience. The pavilion won first prize for the best theme development of Expo 2010 for class A pavilions

=== Greece ===
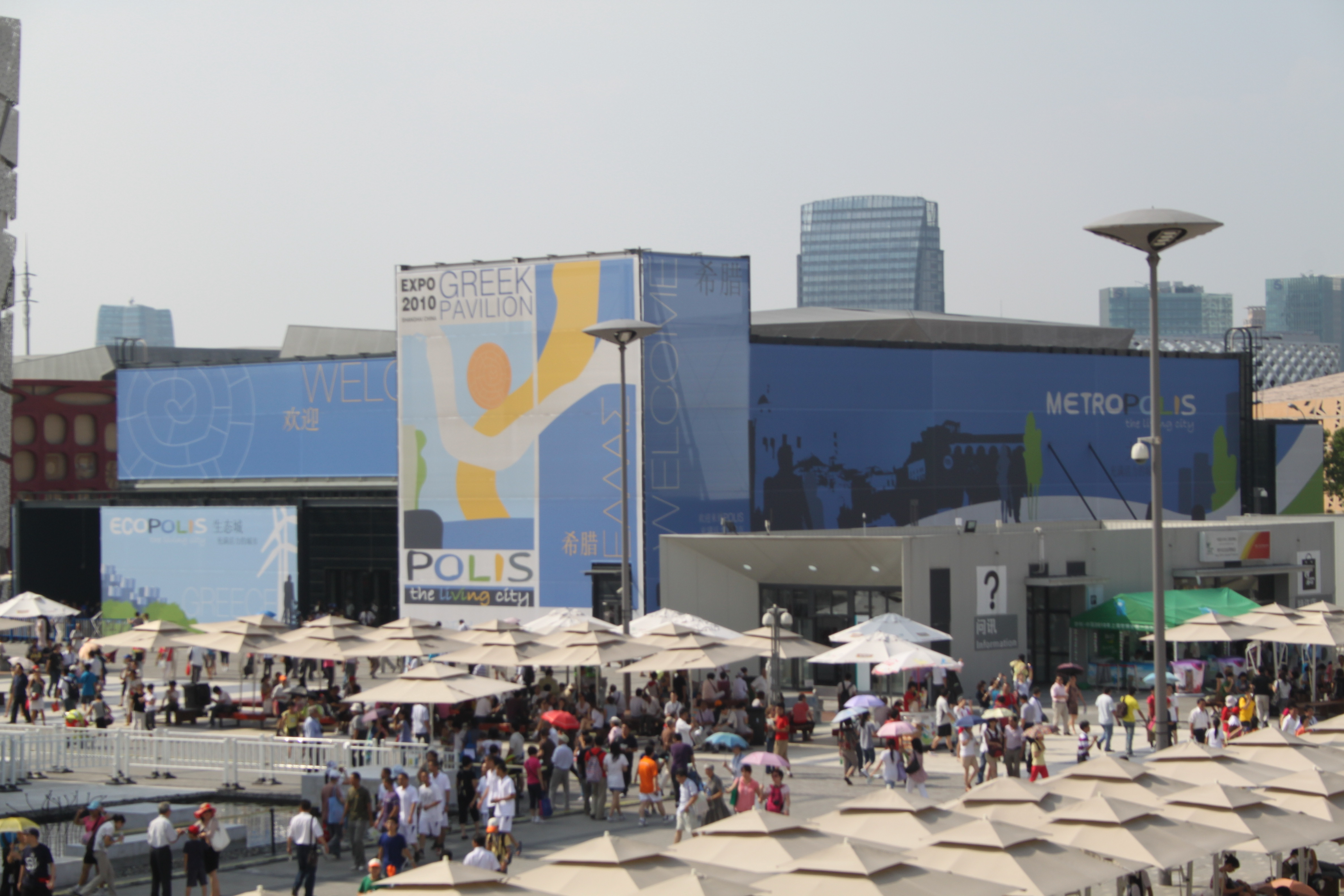
Greece Pavilion

Due to the financial crisis, the budget for the Greece Pavilion was cut short by 40%.. The exhibition featured the countries' main highlights, including its Olympic tradition, in the hope of attracting Chinese tourists to visit Greece. By presenting the 24 hours of a day, the Greek Pavilion hoped to give visitors an experience of Greek night life in addition to the exhibits.

=== Hong Kong ===
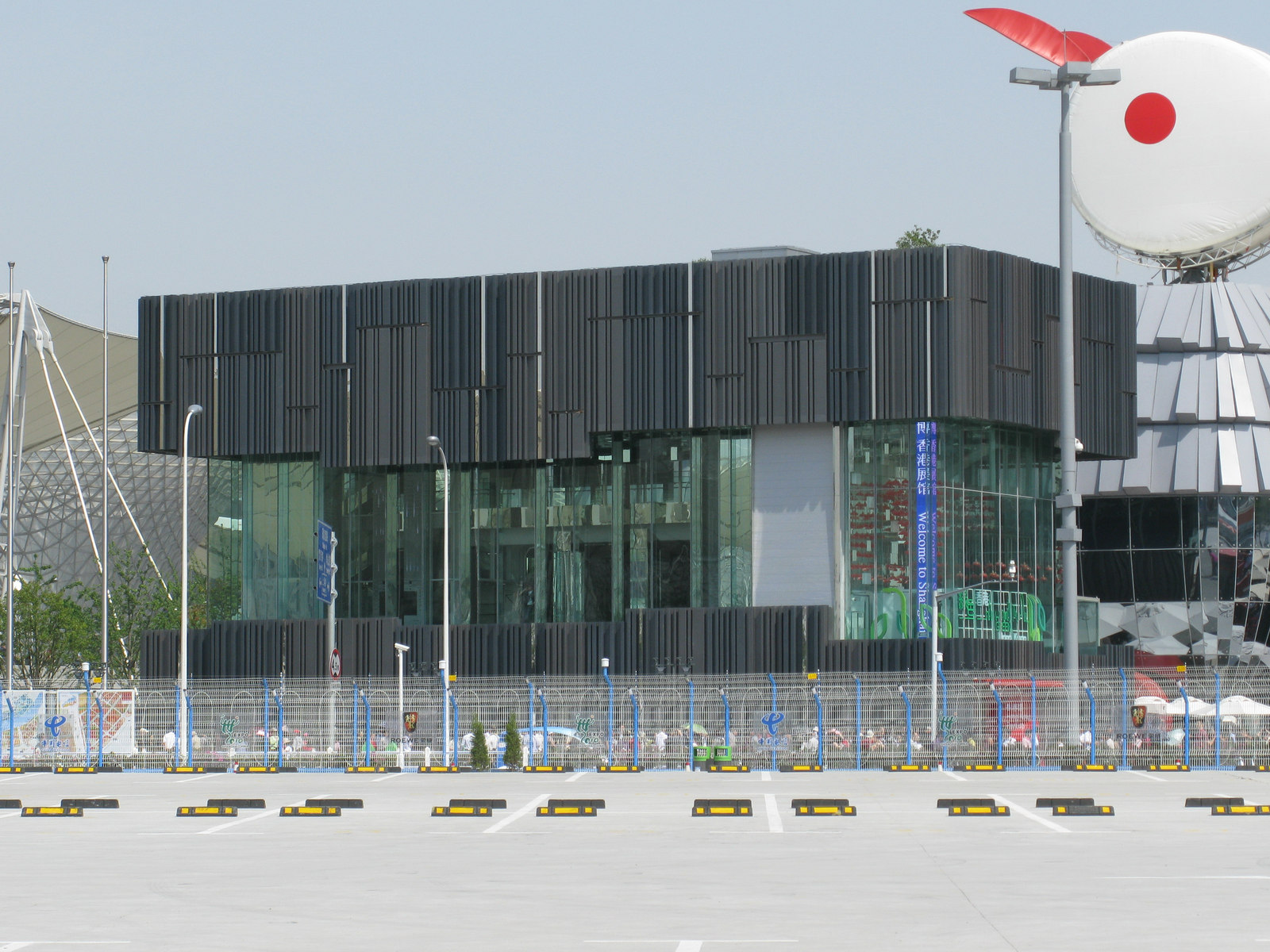
Hong Kong Pavilion

The 2,000 m^{2} Hong Kong Pavilion featured an indoor recreation of the Hong Kong Wetland Park. The main theme of the Pavilion was "Hong Kong – A City with Unlimited Potential".

According to the official site, the pavilion welcomed its 1 millionth visitor on July 31, 2010, and its 2 millionth visitor on August 17, 2010.

=== Hungary ===
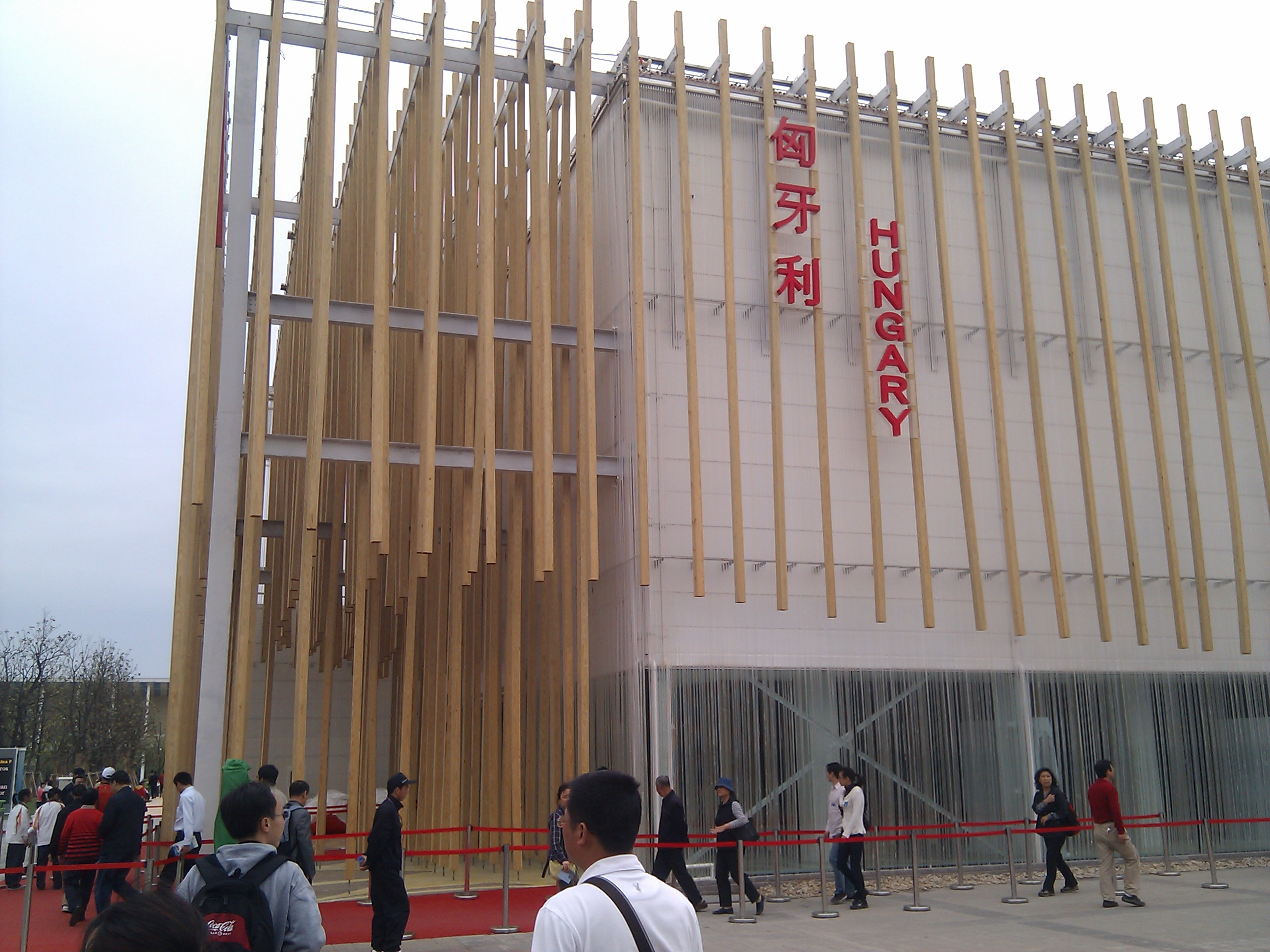
Hungary Pavilion

The Hungary Pavilion had a remarkable interior ceiling, consisting of about 1000 wooden bars hanging loosely from the ceiling, some 600 among them moved up and down by small motors. The pavilion was decorated with natural materials; wood and a pebble stone floor, all surrounded by a water curtain – representing green living in the city. The pavilion's center exhibition item was a Gömböc, a Hungarian invention by two mathematicians. Gomboc is a homogeneous object with the same self-righting feature as roly-poly toy. Gomboc symbolizes the creative and innovative spirit of the Hungarians, and also the philosophical aspect of mankind striving for harmony and balanced life.

On August 8, 2010, the pavilion welcomed its 3,333,333rd visitor – a third of Hungary's population. By the end of the expo, the Hungarian Pavilion received a total of 5,785,400 visitors. The Pavilion won the Silver Prize in pavilion design for Category C.

=== Iceland ===
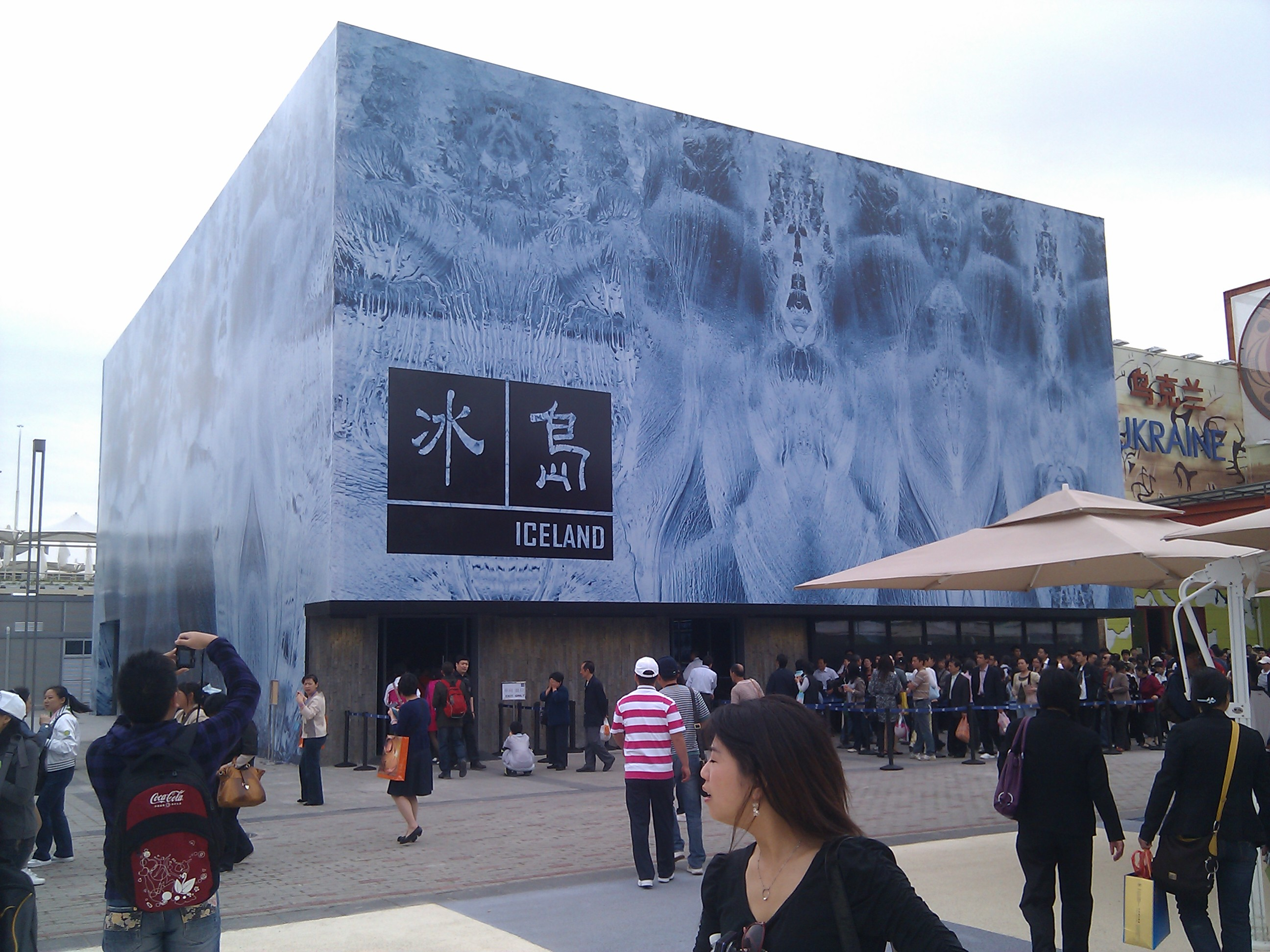
Iceland Pavilion

The Iceland Pavilion was built in the form of a cube with the outside covered with a blue and white photo of ice. The interior of the pavilion featured videos projected onto the walls and ceiling which depicted Icelandic nature, geysers, volcanoes, a lagoon and the night skyline of Reykjavík, Iceland's capital.

=== India ===
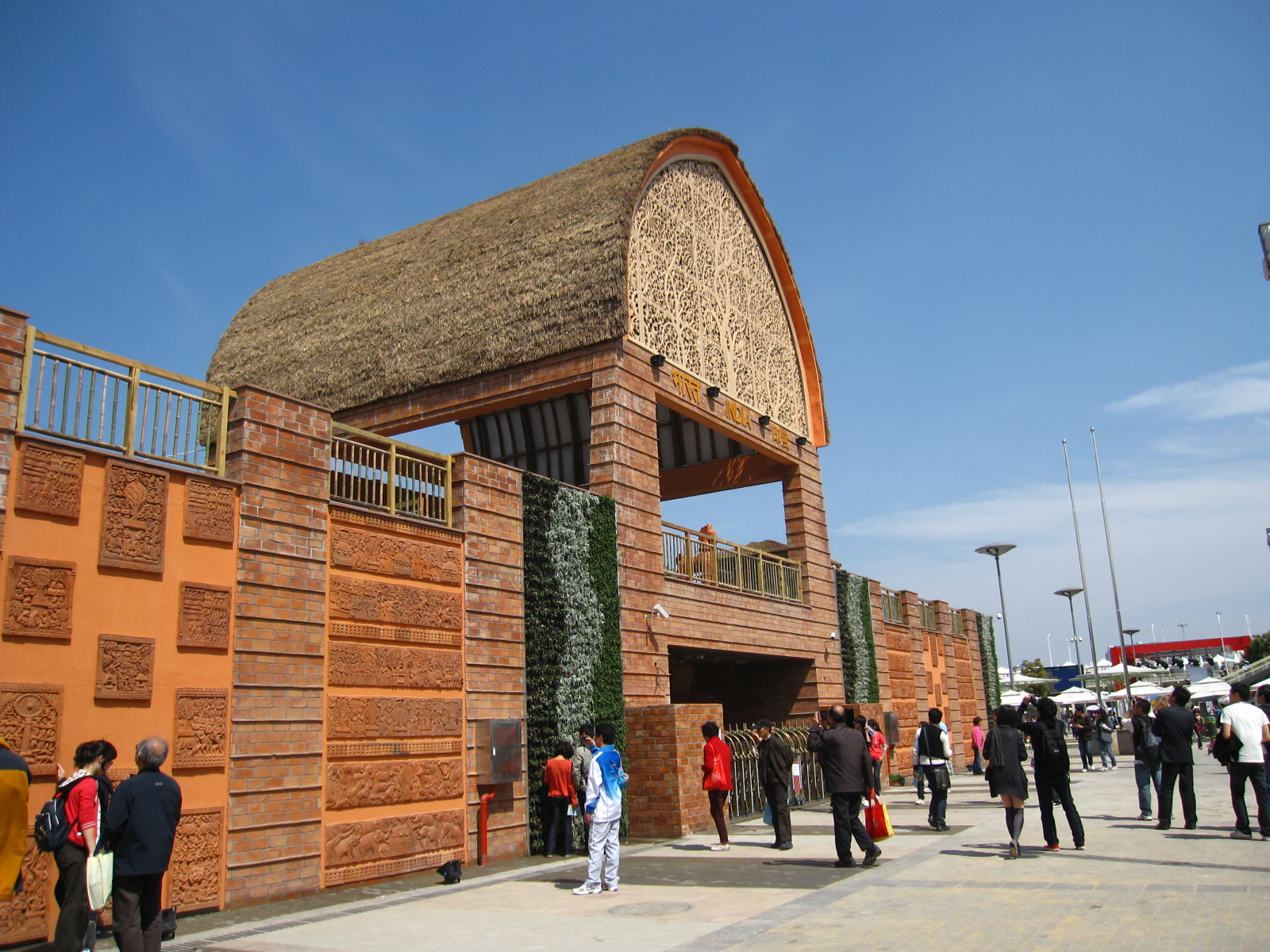
India Pavilion

The 4,000 m^{2} India Pavilion showcased the world's largest bamboo dome inspired by the Sanchi Stupa, an ancient Buddhist monument built between 321 and 187 BC by Ashoka. The main theme was "Cities of Harmony", reflecting the country's wide range of ethnic groups, religions and languages. The pavilion had a crimson central dome, while the focus of the exhibit was on the interaction between rural and urban areas through exchange of goods and services. Revolving around a journey of Indian cities from ancient times through medieval periods to modern India, the pavilion showcased India's rich cultural heritage, its faith, culture and language diversity, traditional and modern technological development, and urban-rural interface.

Notable pieces of the pavilion included:

- Tree of Life: The entrance to the pavilion was through a vaulted portal with the "Tree of Life" carving inspired by the Sidi Saiyyed Mosque at Ahmedabad. The central dome was herb-roofed with the "Tree of Life" in copper. The innovative combination of plants and metals distinguished the dome.
- Zero-chemical Area: The seemingly ancient India Pavilion was replete with marvelous modern technologies. The pavilion was designed as a zero-chemical Area. Energy efficiency was made possible through the use of solar panels, wind mills, herbs, and bamboo. The terracotta and stone floor was inspired by the palace at Rampur in Varanasi and was cooled by embedded pipes, so that visitors would be touring around the pavilion in a cool and comfortable temperature even in the summer.
- Indian Market: The "Indian Market" was open for curious visitors. In fact, the attic in this market belonged to one of the exhibition areas of the India Pavilion, from which one could get a bird's-eye view of the whole pavilion. The market was also a catering service area where traditional food from India was served.
- 360-degree Holographic Projection: Depicted India's evolution from the ancient times of Mohenjodaro and Harappa (dating back to 2000–3000 BC) through the medieval period to modern India. The display around the dome elaborated on the theme "Cities of Harmony".
- Shopping Arcade and Amphitheater: The Shopping Arcade in the pavilion enabled visitors to see the artisans from different parts of the country demonstrating their skills. Also, specialized products from different regions were available for sale. The Shopping Arcade also displayed typical Indian columns in its arcade structure. The Amphitheater hosted cultural shows from different regions of India on a regular basis.

=== Indonesia ===
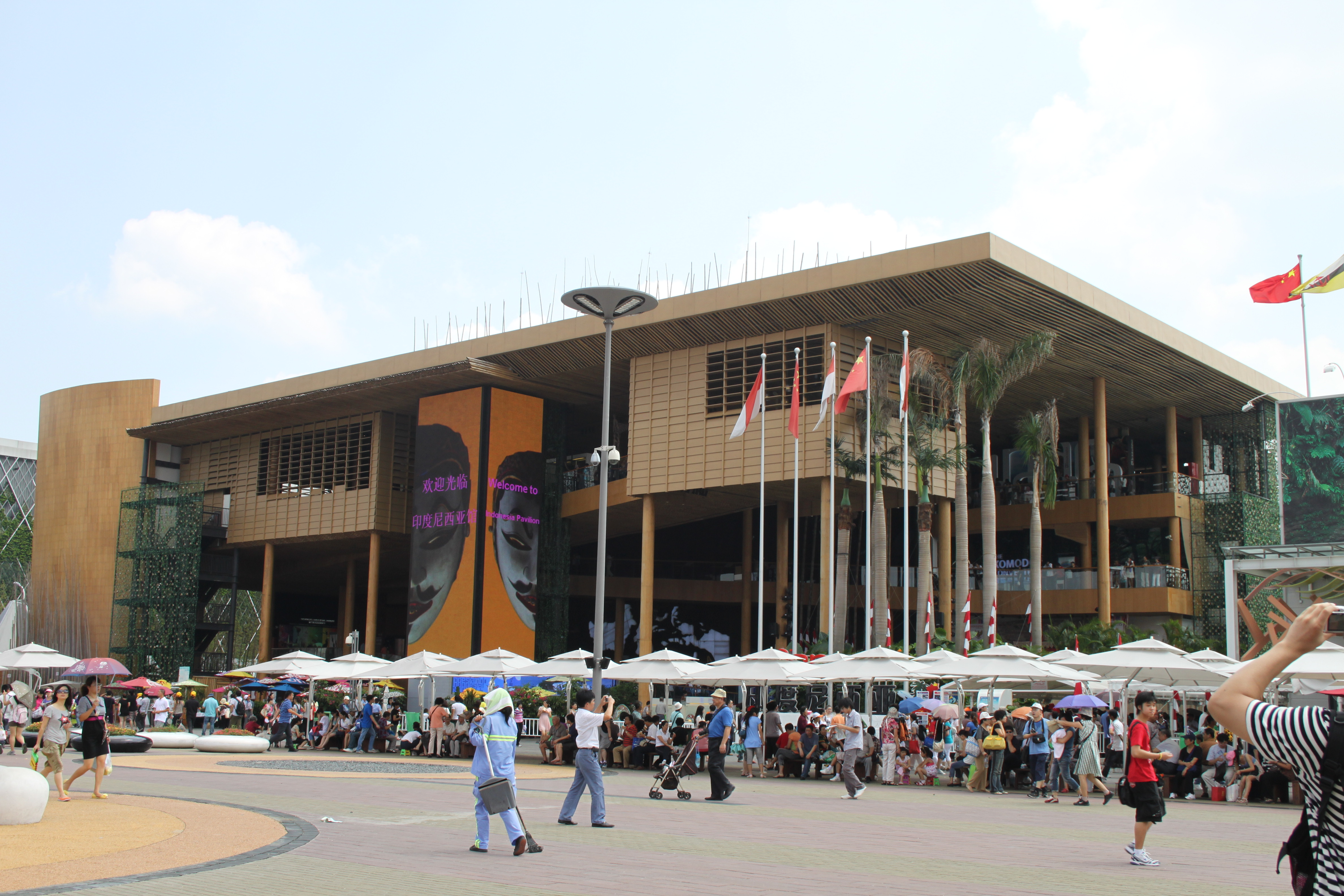
Indonesia Pavilion

The 4,000 m^{2} Indonesia Pavilion was themed "Biodiverse City".

The exterior of the pavilion was covered with green bamboo sticks with bamboo growing from the pavilion's ceiling.

The pavilion was divided into three zones: Bio Zone, Diverse Zone and City Zone. The building also featured an indoor waterfall, Bio Tunnel, Music Tunnel, 680 m^{2} Borobudur Megawall, collection of 2,200 narrative exhibits, indoor screening room, amphitheater, dining area and coffee corner.

The mascots of the pavilion were Pongo the orangutan and Koko the Komodo dragon.

The total cost of the Indonesian Pavilion is estimated to have been IDR 200 billion or approx US$23 million.

The Indonesia Pavilion had its 8 millionth visitor on October 29, 2010. It was the 10th most visited Pavilion and received bronze medal in Creative Display category at the Pavilion Award.

=== Iran ===
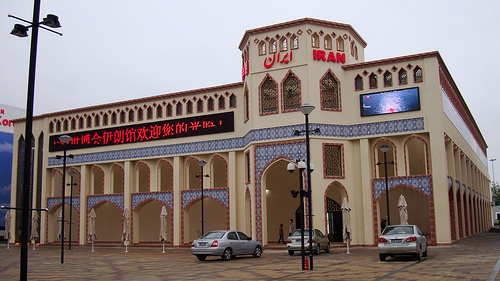
Iran Pavilion

The Iran pavilion's official theme was "Blending of Diverse Cultures in the City" and highlighted traditional Islamic architecture and the colorful culture that can be found in Iranian cities. The pavilion appeared in three parts that focused on the past, present and future of Iranian excellence. A map on the front of the building focused on the ancient silk road that used to stretch across Asia, which could be seen whilst waiting to enter the pavilion. Upon entering the pavilion the visitor could see replicas of colorful Islamic tile work, and beyond a giant quarter sphere in the center of a great room that symbolizes Iran as one of the four great human populations. There were some antiques and cultural relics scattered around and a loft upstairs where rugs and sewn handicrafts were for sale. Looking forward, Iran had several displays that highlighted their ability to drill for oil and other energy resources. There was also a laser harp that could be played by visitors.

=== Iraq ===
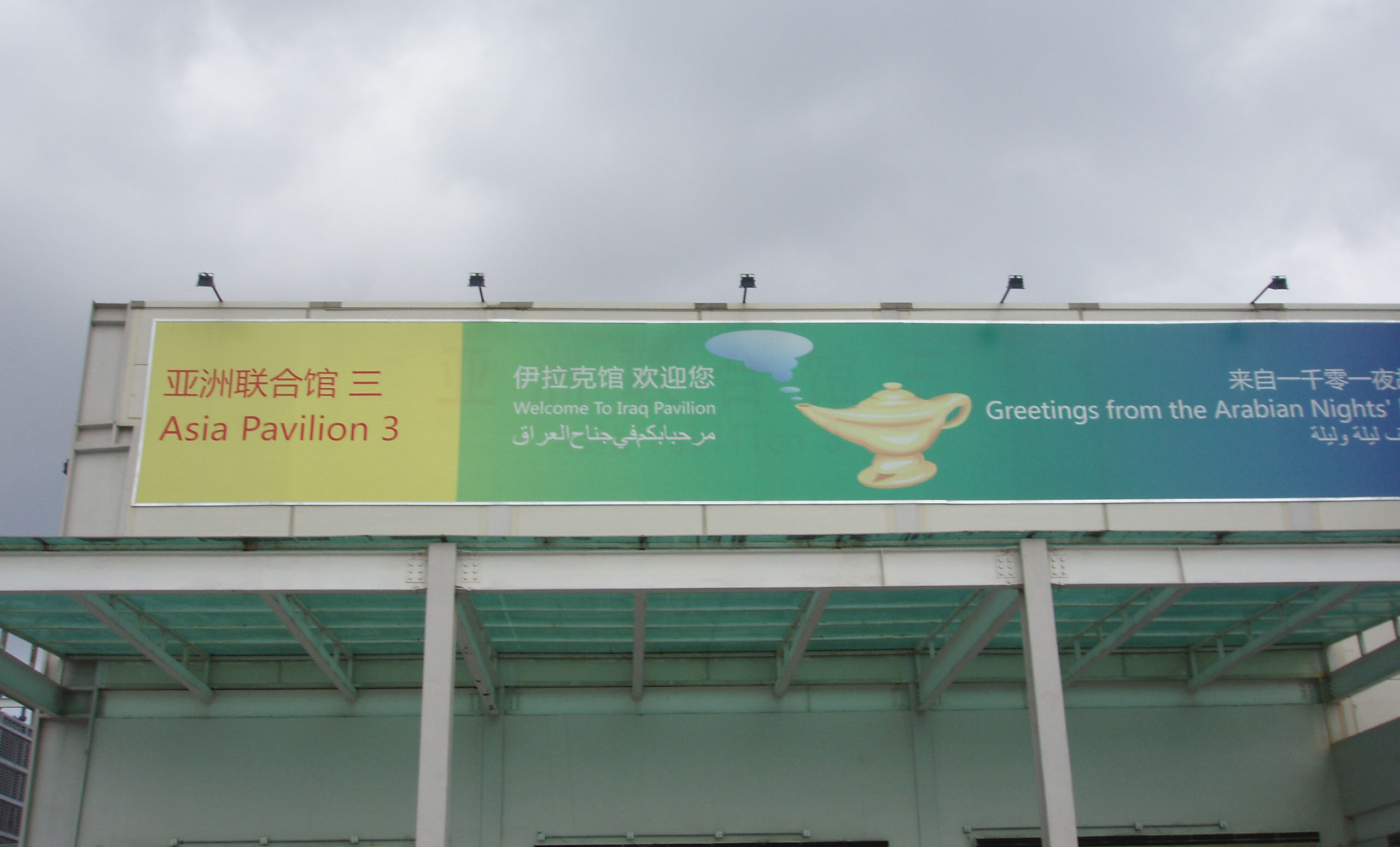
Iraq Pavilion

The Iraq Pavilion was located in Area A.

=== Ireland ===
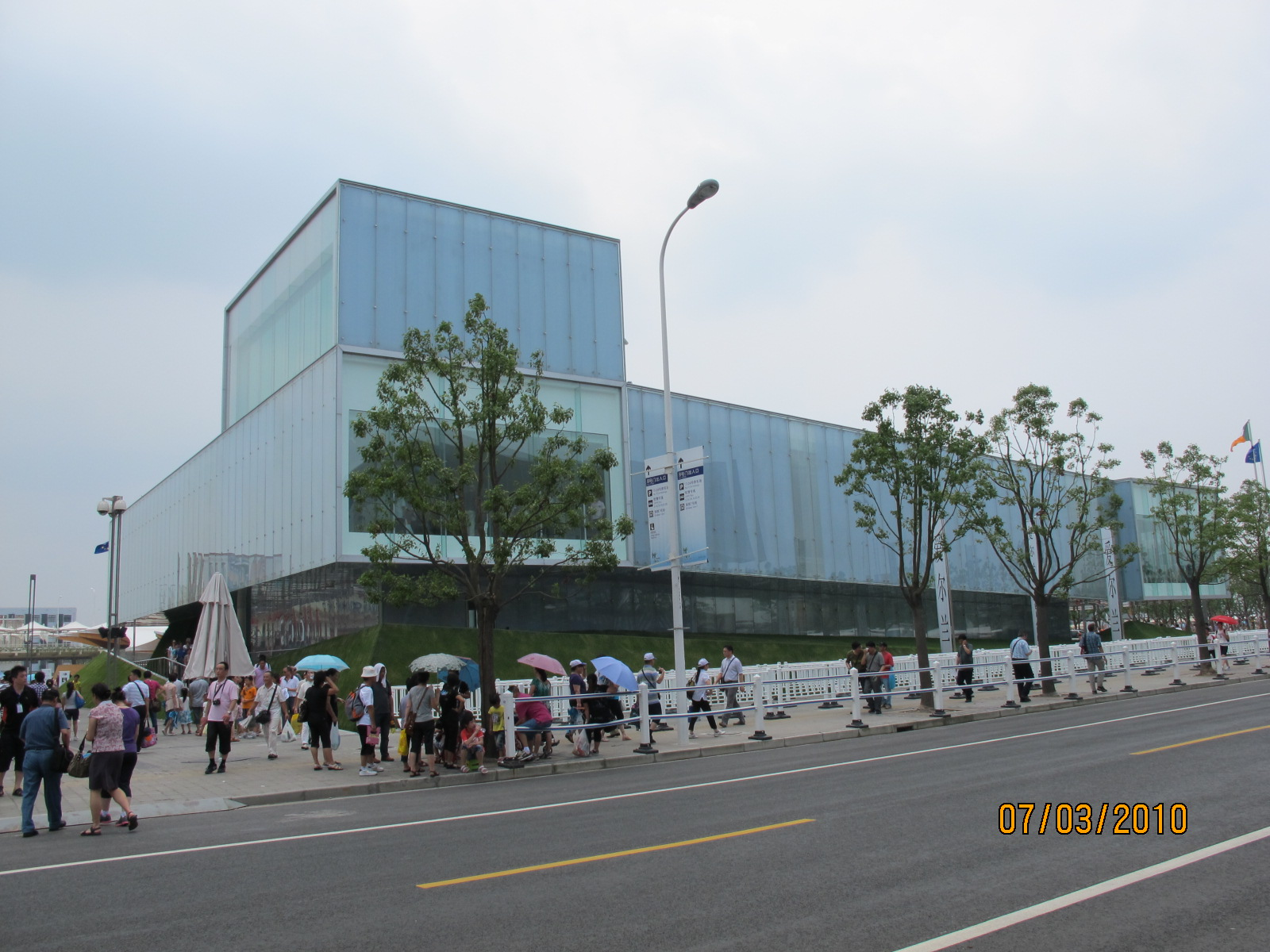
Ireland Pavilion

The 2,500 m^{2} Ireland Pavilion was themed "Urban Space and the Evolution of Urban Life Style". The pavilion's theme symbolized the relationship between urban and nature. The exhibition inside sets the creativity of the Irish, their ancient history, vibrant modern culture, educational traditions, and technical innovations into the context of a small, but varied and beautiful island.

=== Israel ===
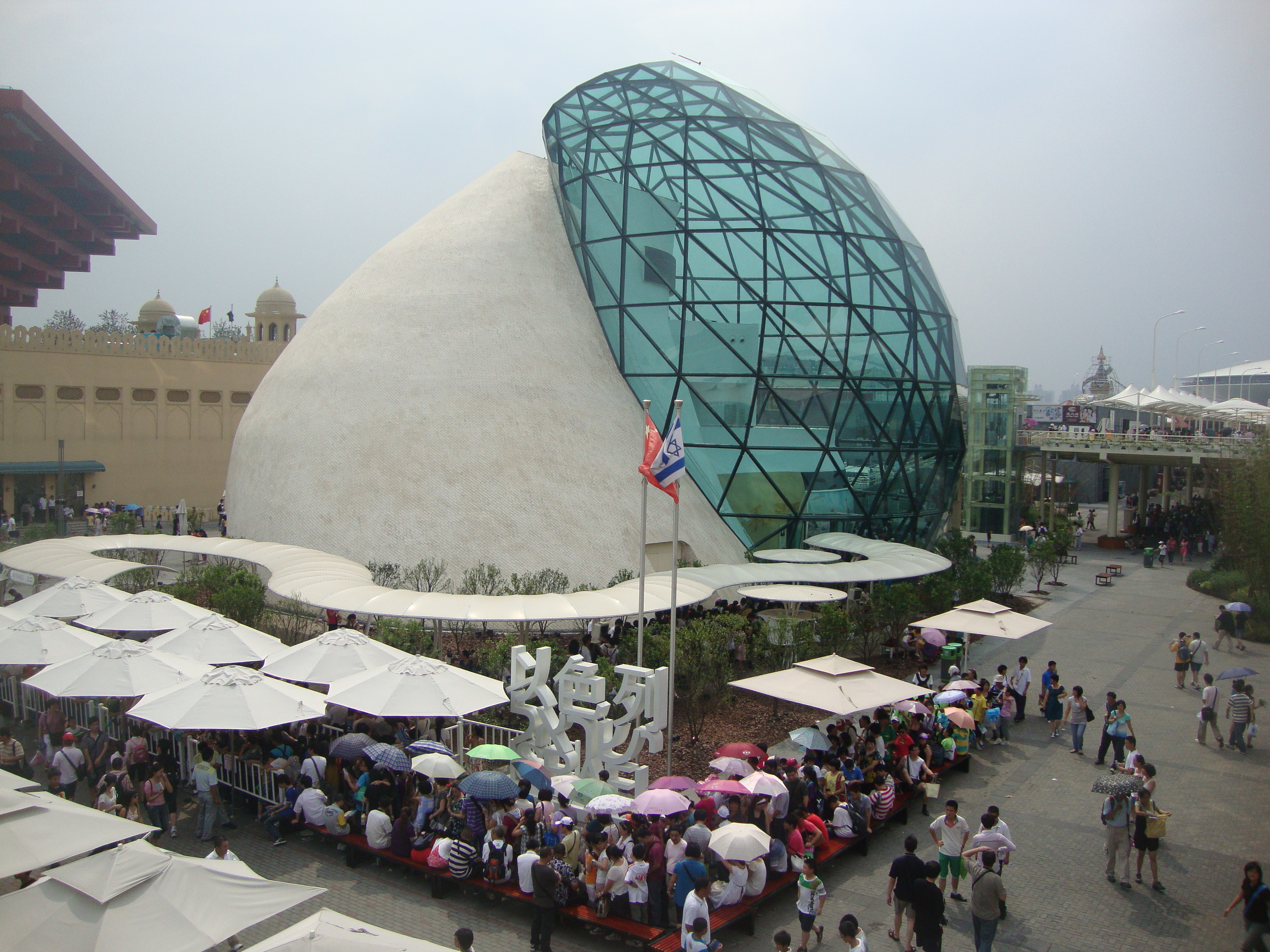
Israel Pavilion

The 2,000 m^{2} Israel Pavilion was composed of two streamlined buildings, which looked as if two clasped hands. One side of the pavilion was made of authentic stone while the other is made from transparent glass. The design symbolized Israeli innovation and technology as well as the connection between humanity and nature. The pavilion highlighted both modern and ancient Jewish culture. It consisted of three areas: the Whispering Garden, the Hall of Light, and the Hall of Innovations. The Whispering Garden was an orchard which greeted visitors as they entered the building. Next, inside the natural stone, was the Hall of Innovations, symbolizing links with the earth and history, and the recycling of natural resources. Under the transparent glass was the Hall of Light, symbolizing technology, transparency, lightness and the future. Pavilion Highlights:

- Green Orchard: A green orchard visible as visitors entered the pavilion. About 50 orange trees were planted, and technology made the trees "whisper" in English and Chinese when visitors walked close to them. Everyone was expected to be in direct touch with nature and the irrigation technology that the Israelis take pride in.
- Innovation: The Hall of Light featured a 15-meter screen that showed films highlighting the country's innovations and technological achievements. As the centerpiece of the pavilion, the Hall of Innovations presented an audiovisual show which allowed visitors to hear from Israeli children, scientists, doctors and inventors, via hundreds of screens. Each light sphere represented innovation and technical breakthroughs in such fields as agriculture, food, pharmacology, solar and green energy, science, music, literature, high-tech, telecommunication, and security.
- Capsule: Highlights included a capsule containing a mini-camera that can be swallowed for internal medical checks (the camera can then be discharged naturally and not cause any pain for the patient). It was displayed in the Hall of innovations.

=== Italy ===
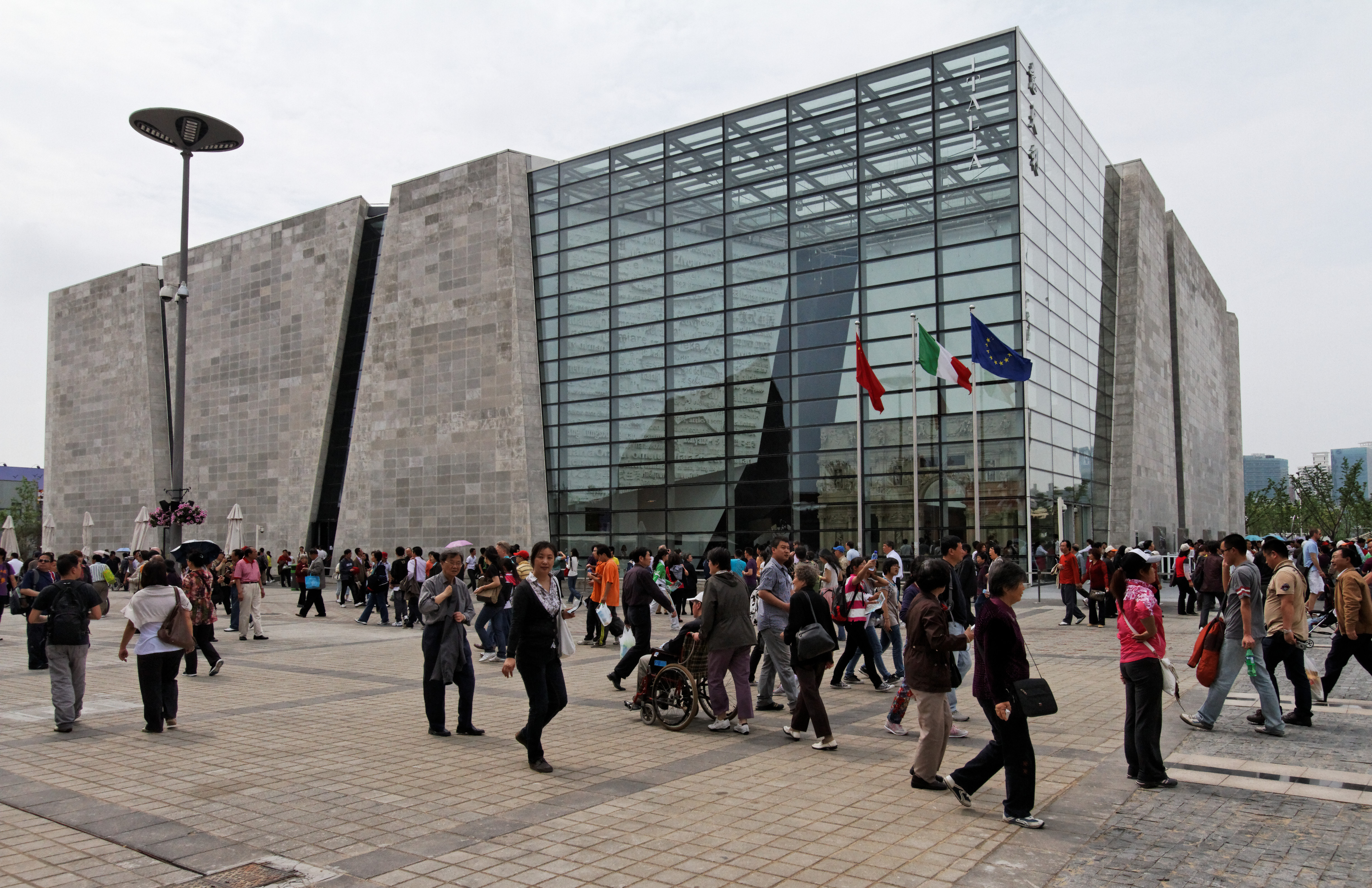
Italy Pavilion

The Italy Pavilion, dubbed "The City of Man," was composed of 20 functional modules which could be assembled freely.

Its design was inspired by the game of Mikado, which is called "Shanghai" in Italy and pick-up sticks elsewhere. In said game, children drop a batch of 20 to 30 sticks on a table and try to move one stick at a time without moving the others until all the sticks are cleared.

The final project was selected from a field of 65 candidates in a competition among European Union entries, said Beniamino Quintieri, the commissioner general for Italy. The 20 modules represent the 20 regions of Italy, making the whole pavilion embody a mini Italian city.

The building's design also represented the harmony of different cultures and regions. When people walked in the pavilion, they were to feel themselves as if walking in a city that combines Shanghai's Shikumen-style lanes and an Italian square.

Italy reserved a 6,000 m^{2} plot of land for its pavilion. The edifice was made with cutting edge transparent cement which constitutes the 3,774 blocks of transparent concrete covering the building. Italcementi Group, an Italy-based cement maker, developed the transparent cement employed to build the pavilion. Although the Italian group has not fully disclosed what was put into the mixture to make the cement, they said it contains transparent thermoplastic resin and inorganic materials such as alumina which can become solid without the use of water. Each block was able to transmit 20% of the light passing through., the cement blocks themselves were produced in Taiwan by Romastone

Hong Hao, director of the Bureau of World Expo Shanghai Coordination, said that since Milan won the bid to host World Expo 2015, Italy was more than just a participant at Shanghai Expo. He said that China and Italy were the hosts of "sister Expos" and would have many chances to share valuable experience.

According to the pavilion's designer Giampaolo Imbrighi the Italian pavilion had these fundamental characteristics:

- image – first and foremost seen as a window of Italian excellence as regards the quality of city life;
- functionality – able to host and help a large number of visitors and even more, astonish them during the six months that EXPO was open;
- the search for architectonic quality – referred to the dual concept tradition/innovation of the materials used for the project which are bioclimatic and eco-compatible.

The spatial atmosphere of the building was brought about by:

- regionalism – combining the variety of customs and uses of both the Chinese and Italian populations in a single national reality of great tradition;
- the urban shape – the building was constructed in such a way that it shows roads and alleys which open onto a square represented by a central court. This was the heart of the Pavilion where you could find integration and exchange with city life.

=== Japan ===
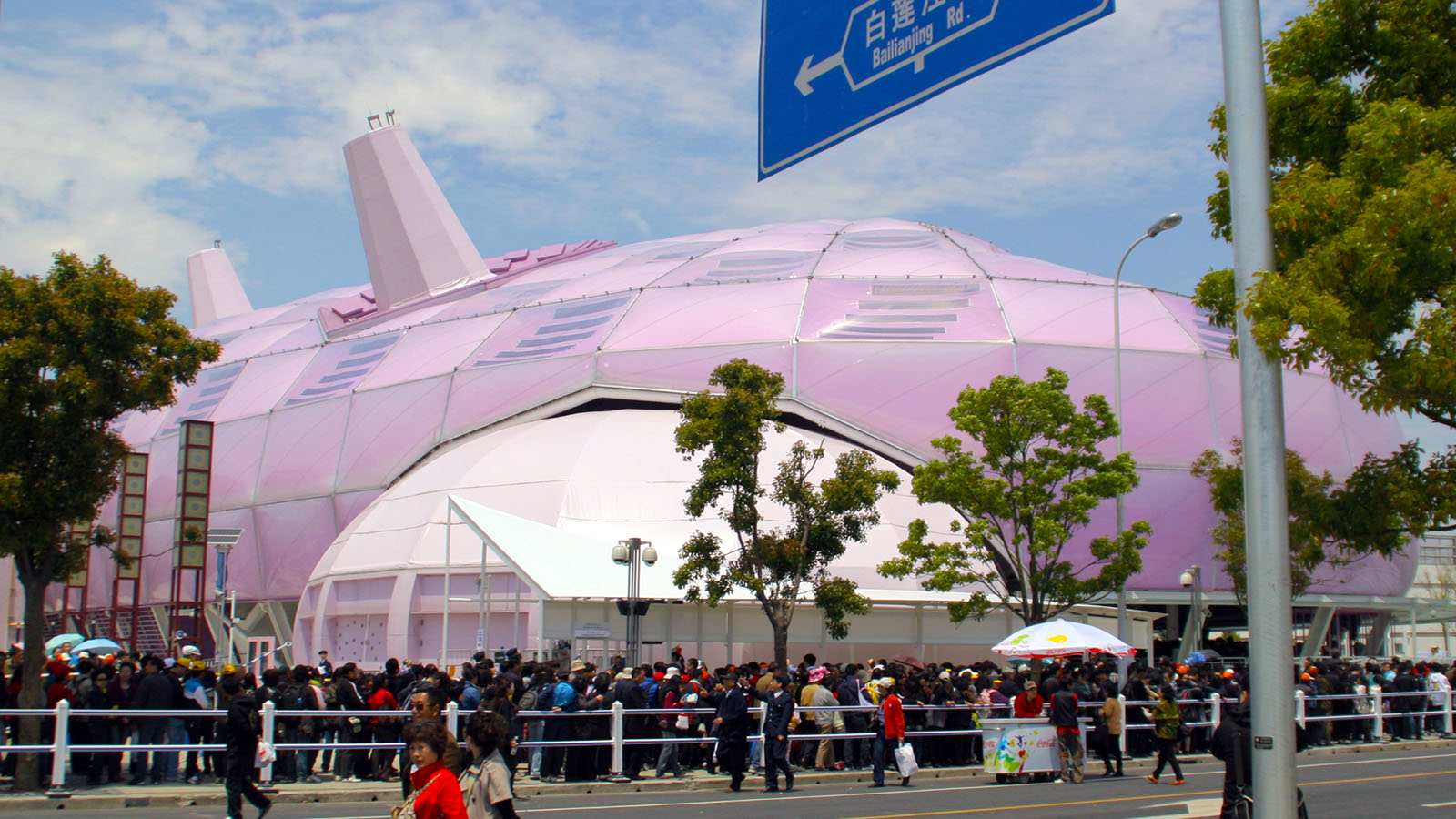
Japan Pavilion

The Japan Pavilion, nicknamed the "Purple Silkworm Island," resembled a living breathing organism. Under the theme "Harmony of the Hearts, Harmony of the Skills," the Japan Pavilion was separated into three separate sections: the exhibition area, the pre-show and the main show.

=== Latvia ===
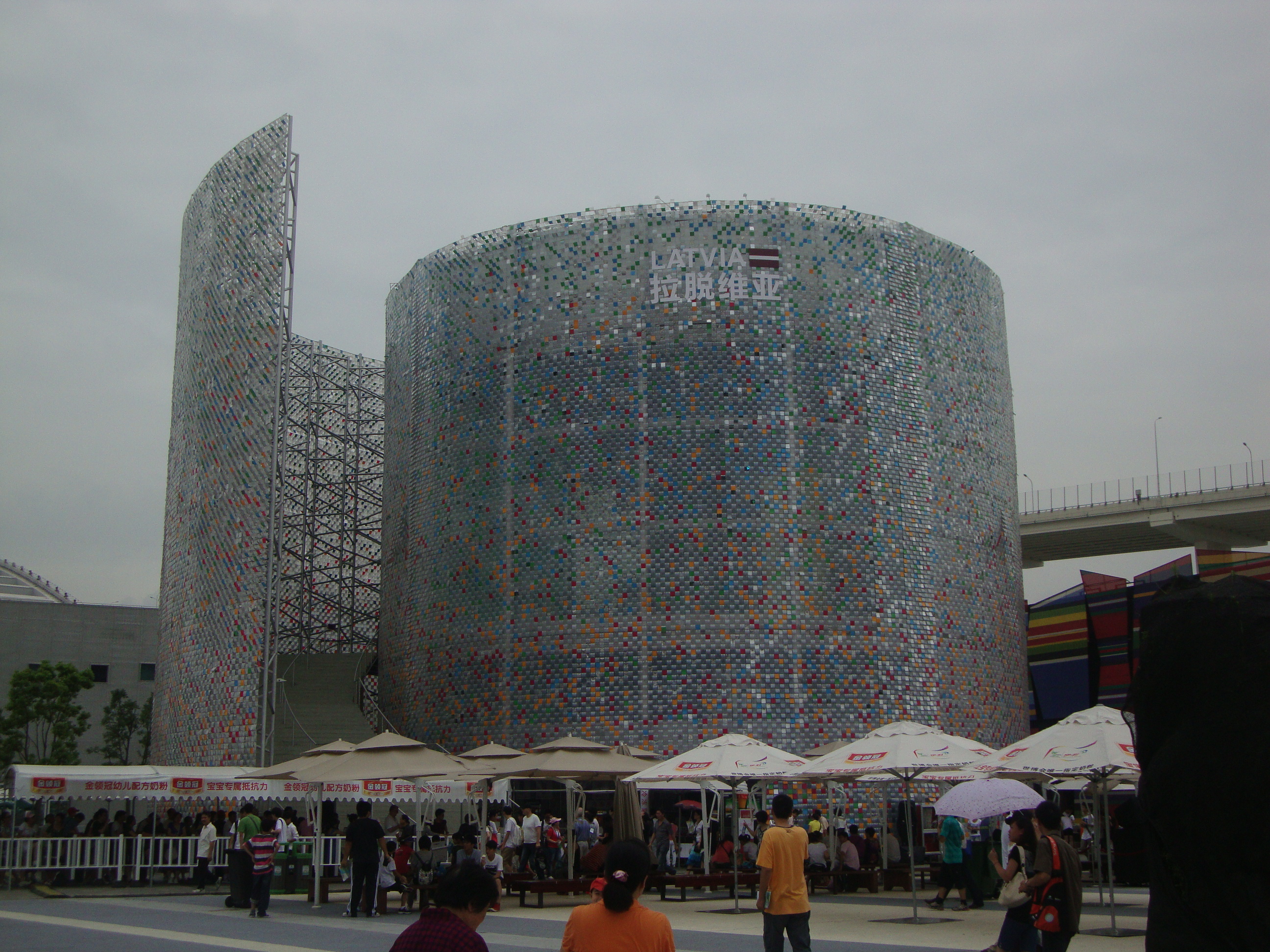
Latvia Pavilion

The Latvia Pavilion was themed as "Innovation city of science and technology". The philosophy and message imparted through the pavilion was "The road to happiness leads to harmony between nature and technology." The Aerodium wind tunnel was the centerpiece of the pavilion. Through the latest technological advances, the wind tunnel allowed visitors to fly in both a figurative and literal sense. The flight was said to have embodied the harmony, happiness and creative energy, that people have always pursued.

=== Lithuania ===
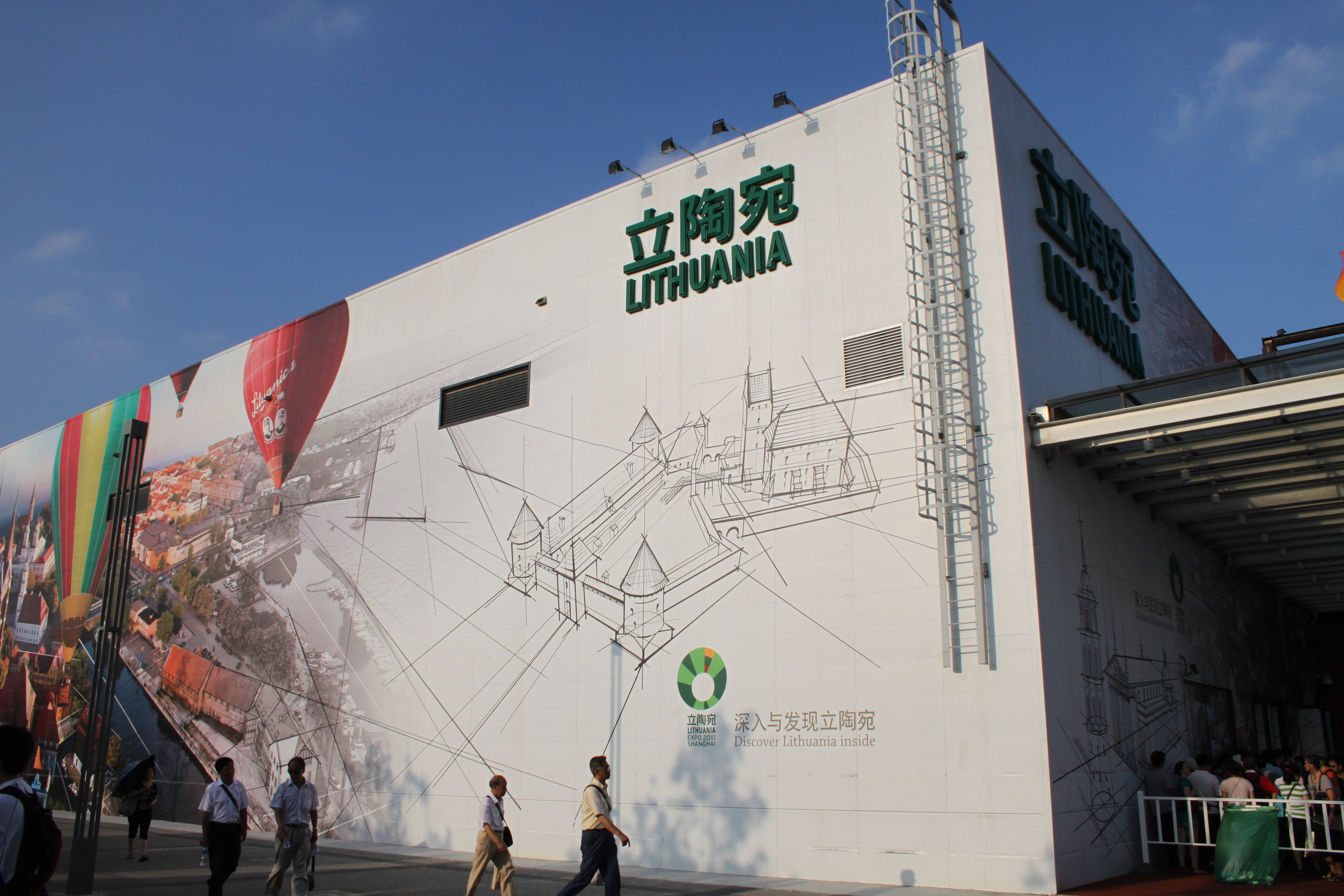
Lithuania Pavilion

By July 31, 2010, the Lithuania Pavilion had received its 3 millionth visitor according to the official website.

=== Macau ===
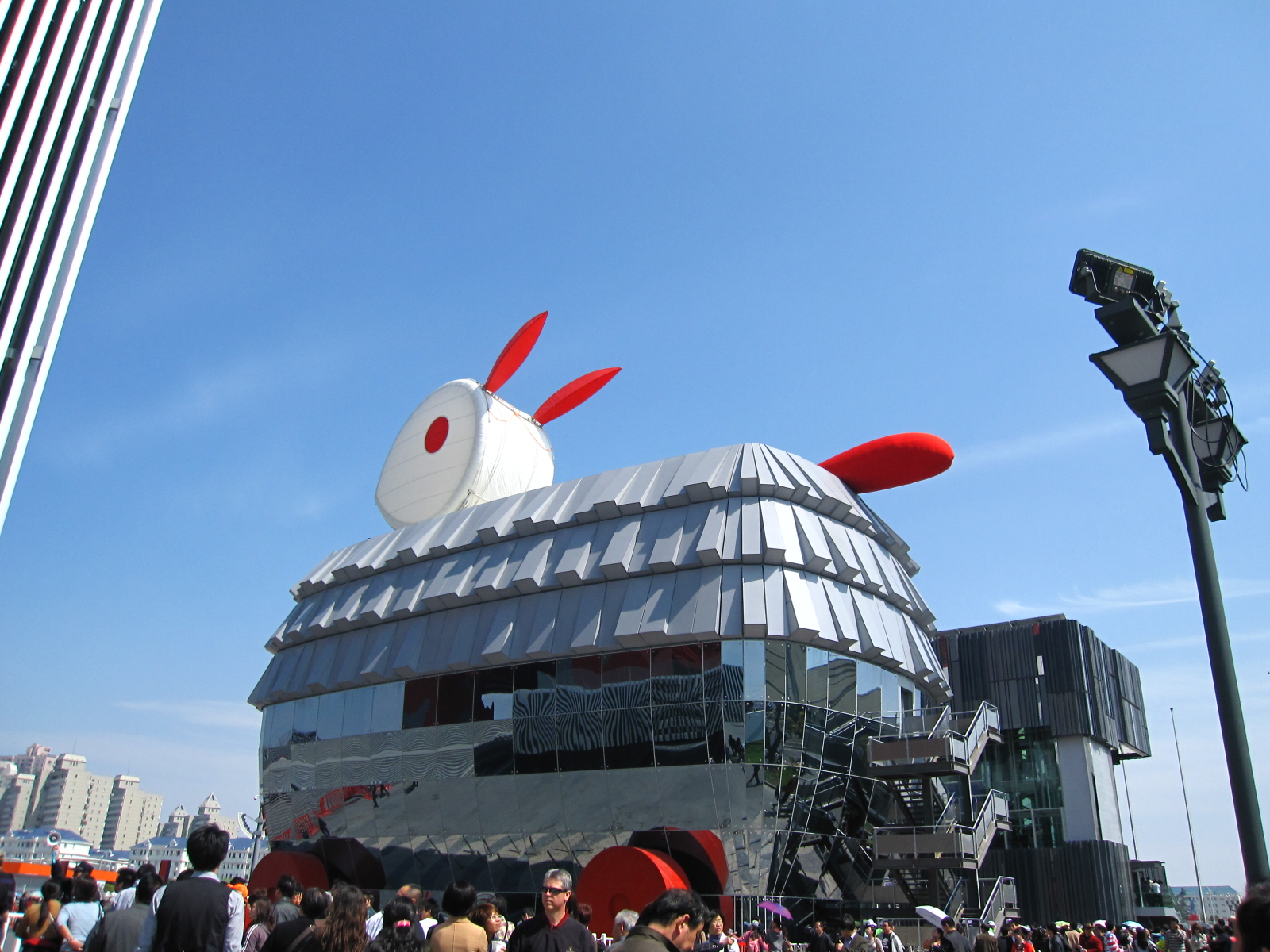
Macau Pavilion

The Macau Pavilion was fashioned in the shape of a rabbit paper lantern, resembling traits of a multicultural city. Inside the pavilion, there were about 120 projectors for the main exhibition.

=== Malaysia ===
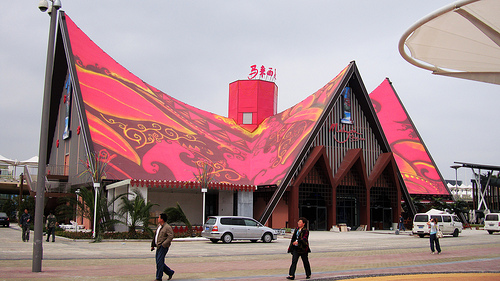
The Malaysia Pavilion.

The Malaysia Pavilion showcased rural building with Minangkabau's "Rumah Gadang" architecture. The roof design with a myriad of colours showcasing the Malaysian "Batik" design. The building comprised two streamlined high slopes with a cross on top, the symbol of Malaysian architecture. The facade of the pavilion was made from a combination of recyclable materials of palm oil and plastic. The design of the Malaysia Pavilion was derived from the unique architectural style of the Rumah Negeri Sembilan (Negeri Sembilan house), distinguished by their horn-shaped roofs too.

After the Expo, the pavilion was donated to the city of Wuxi in the People's Republic of China.

=== Malta ===
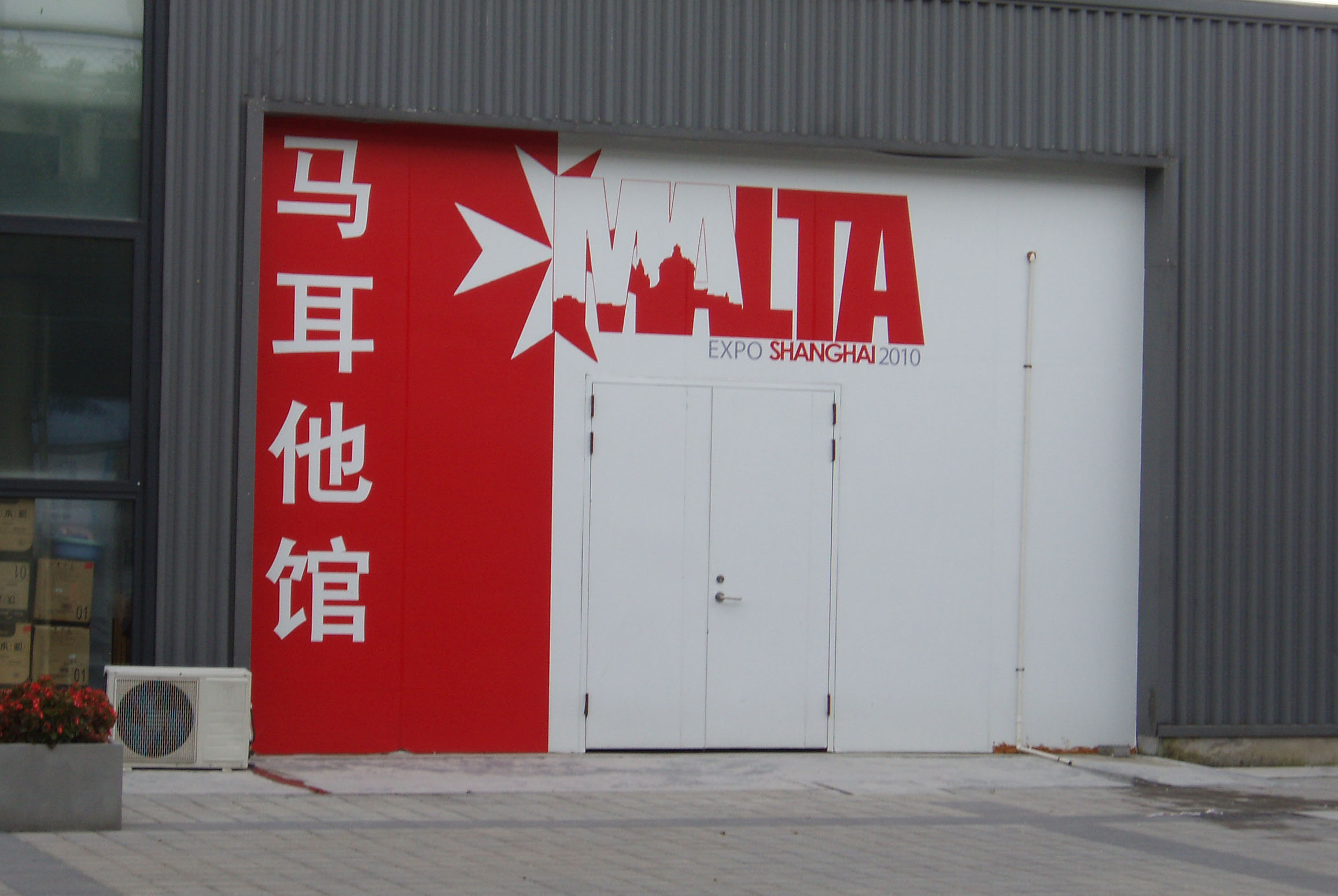
Malta Pavilion

The Malta Pavilion called "Malta: 8000 Years – A Life Center" was located within Zone C of the Expo Site. It featured different exhibition sections, connected by high-tech facilities such as intelligent lighting and audio-visual systems. Movable booths, various sculptures, giant rocks and the evolution of historical cities, were exhibited with sophisticated audio-visual technologies to showcase the complexity, uniqueness, and development trends within Malta's modern cities.

=== Mexico ===
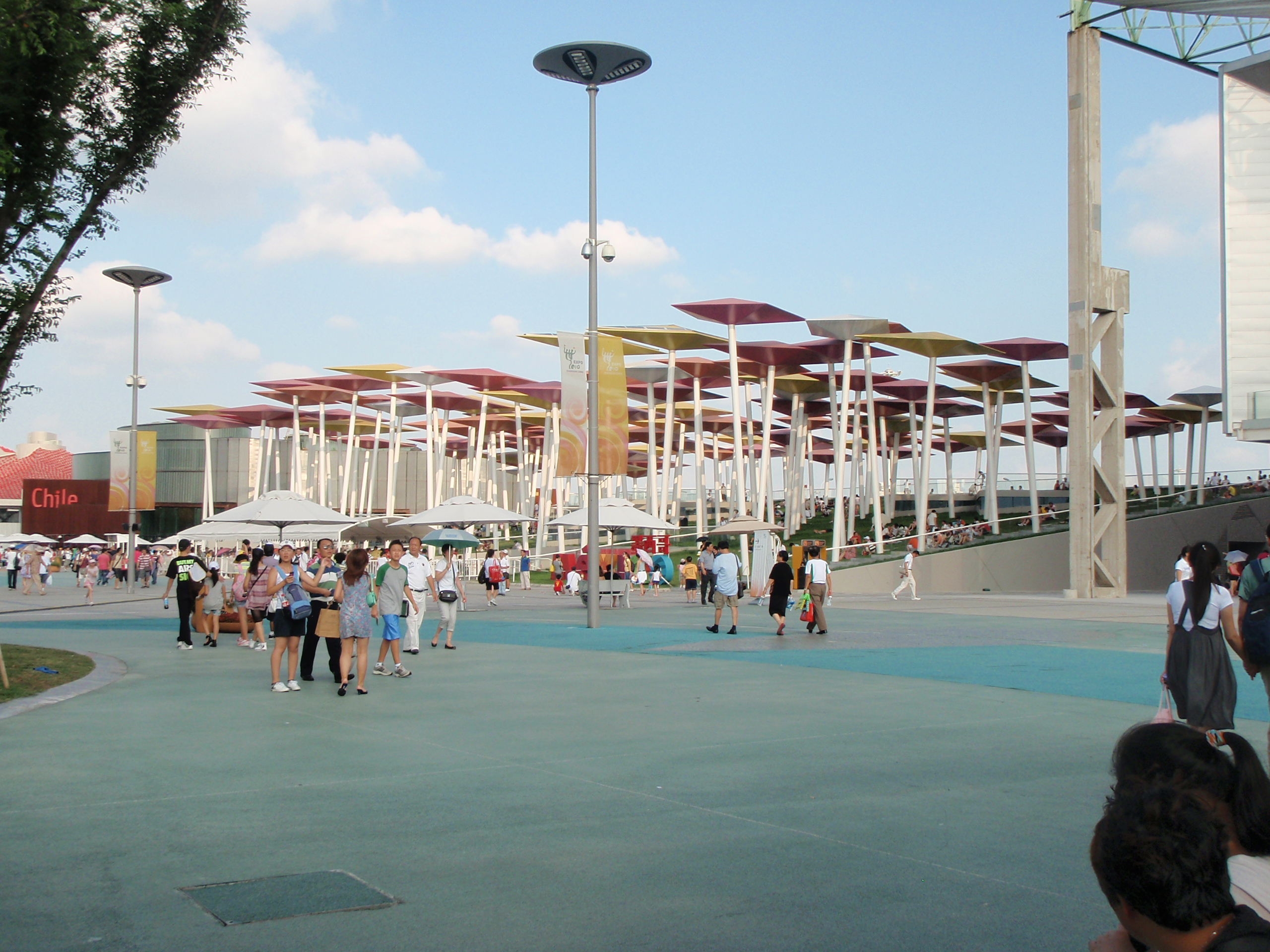
Mexico Pavilion

With an area of 4,000 m^{2} and the theme "Living Better", the Mexico Pavilion was located in Zone C, nearby several other American pavilions. The physical space divided into three levels represented three different moments of the country's cities. The past in the basement of the pavilion, present-day Mexico at the access level and the future on the platform of the slope. A plaza was the centerpiece of the Mexican pavilion, and a representation of a kite forest and a proposal for the future. The natural grass showed the concern for the recovery of green areas in cities.

According to the official site, the Mexico pavilion welcomed its 2 millionth visitor on August 12, 2010 .

=== Myanmar ===
The theme of the Myanmar Pavilion was "Better Urbanization with Harmonized Eco-System". The pavilion-style entrance, magnificent wall, and bridge represented the distinct Southeast Asian flavor and architectural charm of Myanmar. Featuring holy temples and traditional buildings, the pavilion adopted advanced display methods to introduce local customs, rich resources and brilliant culture of Myanmar. The pavilion was located in zone A of the Expo.

=== Nepal ===
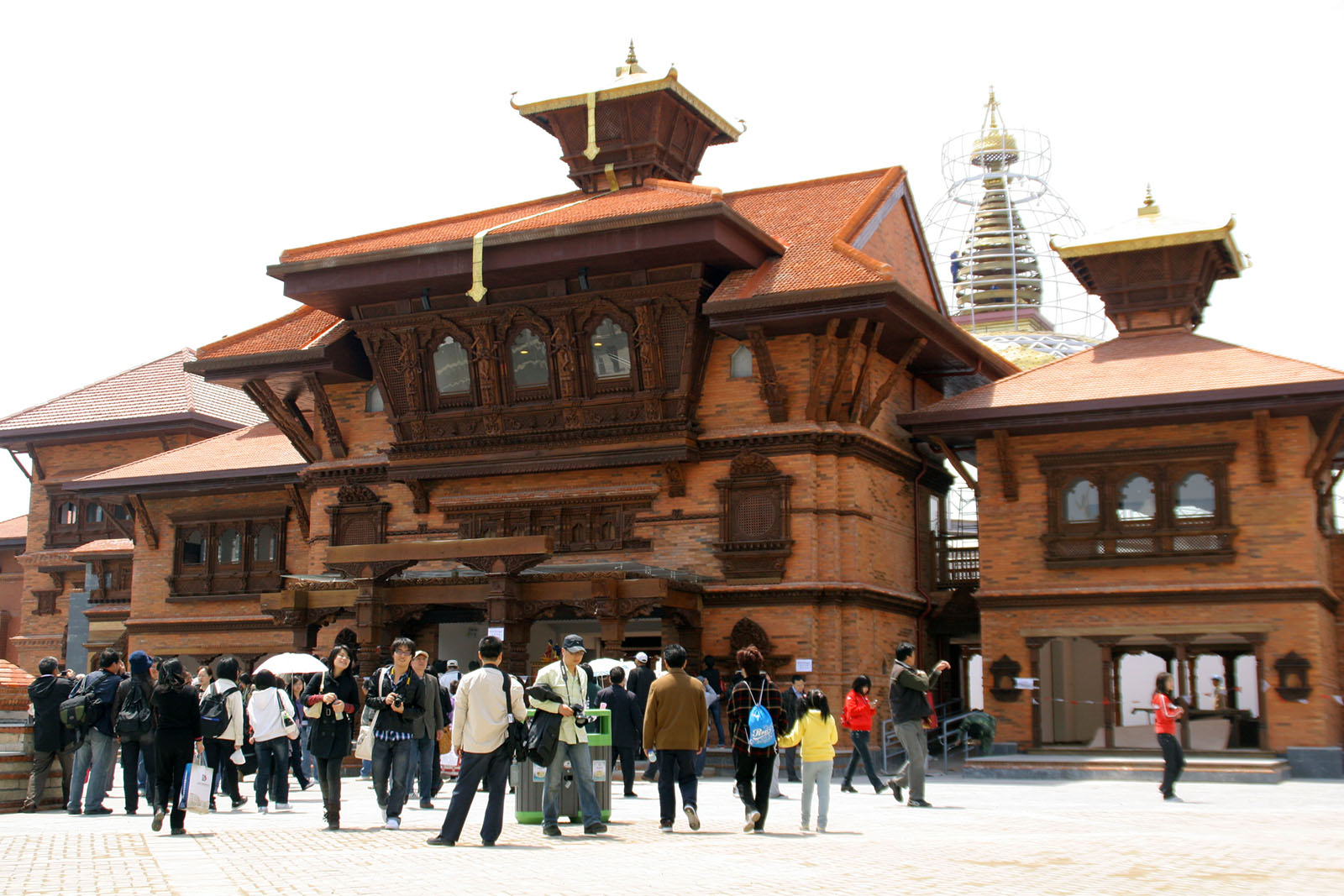
Nepal Pavilion

The Nepal Pavilion was a replica of Kathmandu, with Pagoda styled buildings in the expo. Through the Expo, Nepal planned to attract foreigners to Nepal in the year 2011 as part of the Nepal Tourism Year 2011 campaign.

With the theme "Tales of Kathmandu City", the pavilion captured important historic moments of the city. The pavilion displayed the luster of Kathmandu, the capital city of Nepal and an architectural, artistic, and cultural center that has developed over 2,000 years.

The theme touched upon the soul of a city by exploring its past and future. Another highlight of the pavilion was Nepal's efforts in environmental protection and developing renewable energies. The pavilion was in the form of an ancient Buddhist temple in Kathmandu, surrounded by traditional Nepalese houses.

=== The Netherlands ===
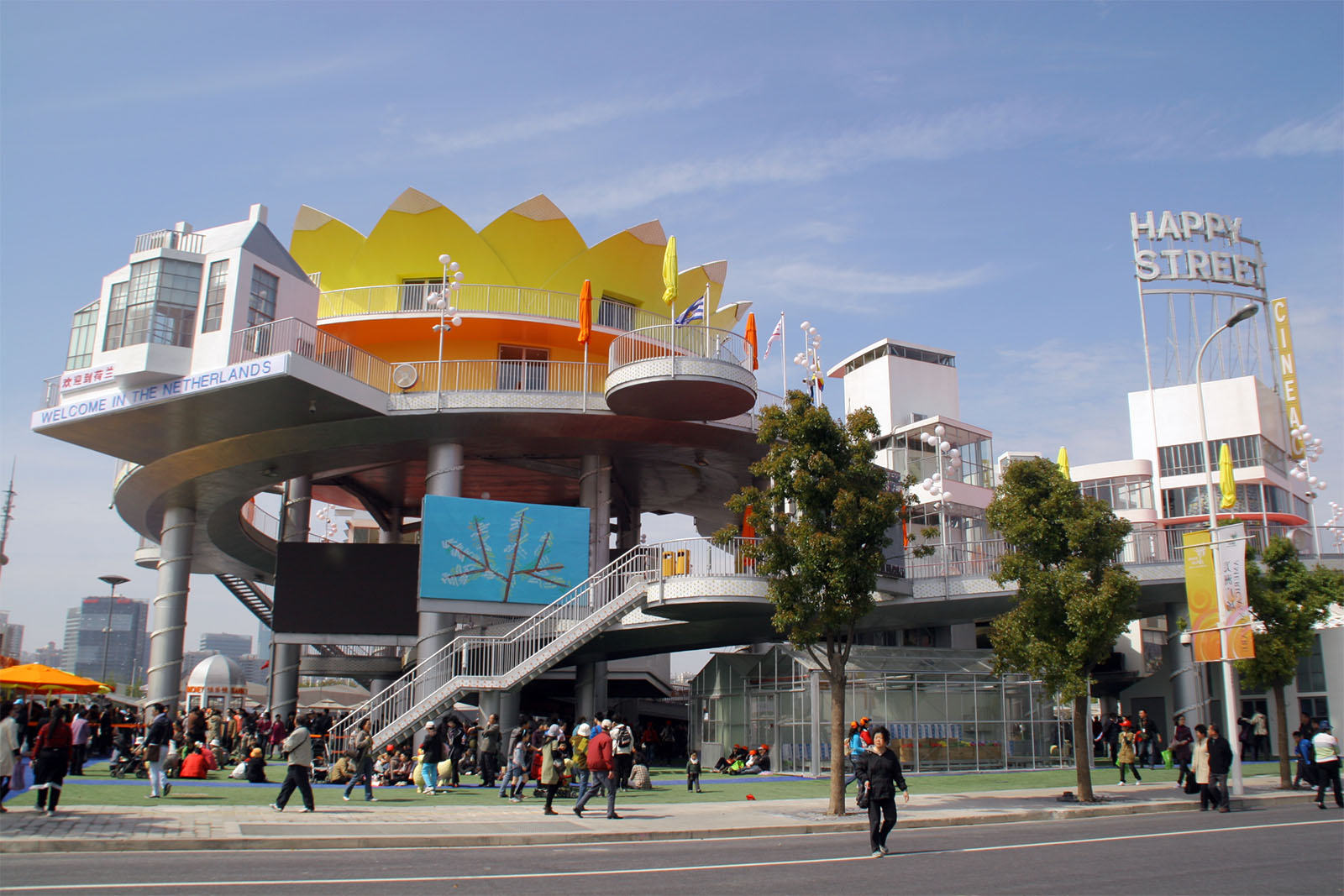
The Dutch pavilion, Happy Street with typical yellow crown

The Netherlands Pavilion, called Happy Street, was built in the form of an 8 (a Chinese magic number, meaning "wealth") and represented a number of typical Dutch houses (28). The houses are not only traditional Dutch canal houses, but also represented some of the architectural highlights of the country. The VIP room was built in the form of a crown, which gave the structure its nickname.

The building was designed by John Körmeling. It was formally opened by prime minister Jan Peter Balkenende. The pavilion's themes were water management, innovation, and architecture. The exhibition showed a hair of the Dutch painter Vincent van Gogh. The catering which was performed by Maison van den Boer (By Appointment to the Court of the Netherlands) included Dutch specialties which were adjusted to the Chinese taste, such as croquettes made with Peking duck.

A separate Water Pavilion of the city of Rotterdam showed a spectacular water printer. The venue management of both the Netherlands and the Rotterdam WaterCity Pavilion was performed by De Vries + Partners / DVP China Eventmarketing.

On October 3, 2010, the 'Happy Street' welcomed its 7th million visitor, which was 10% of the total visitors of the Expo 2010, and above the 5 to 10% goal of the Dutch stand. Its record breaking day was achieved on Saturday October 16, with 80,000 visitors on one day, which was the same day of the record high of 1 million people visiting that Expo on one day. On Thursday the 21st of October 'Happy Street' officially welcomed its 8th million visitor. The Dutch stand won 'the Golden Eye 2010 award' for 'best design of the year', granted by the Dutch Design Awards.

=== New Zealand ===
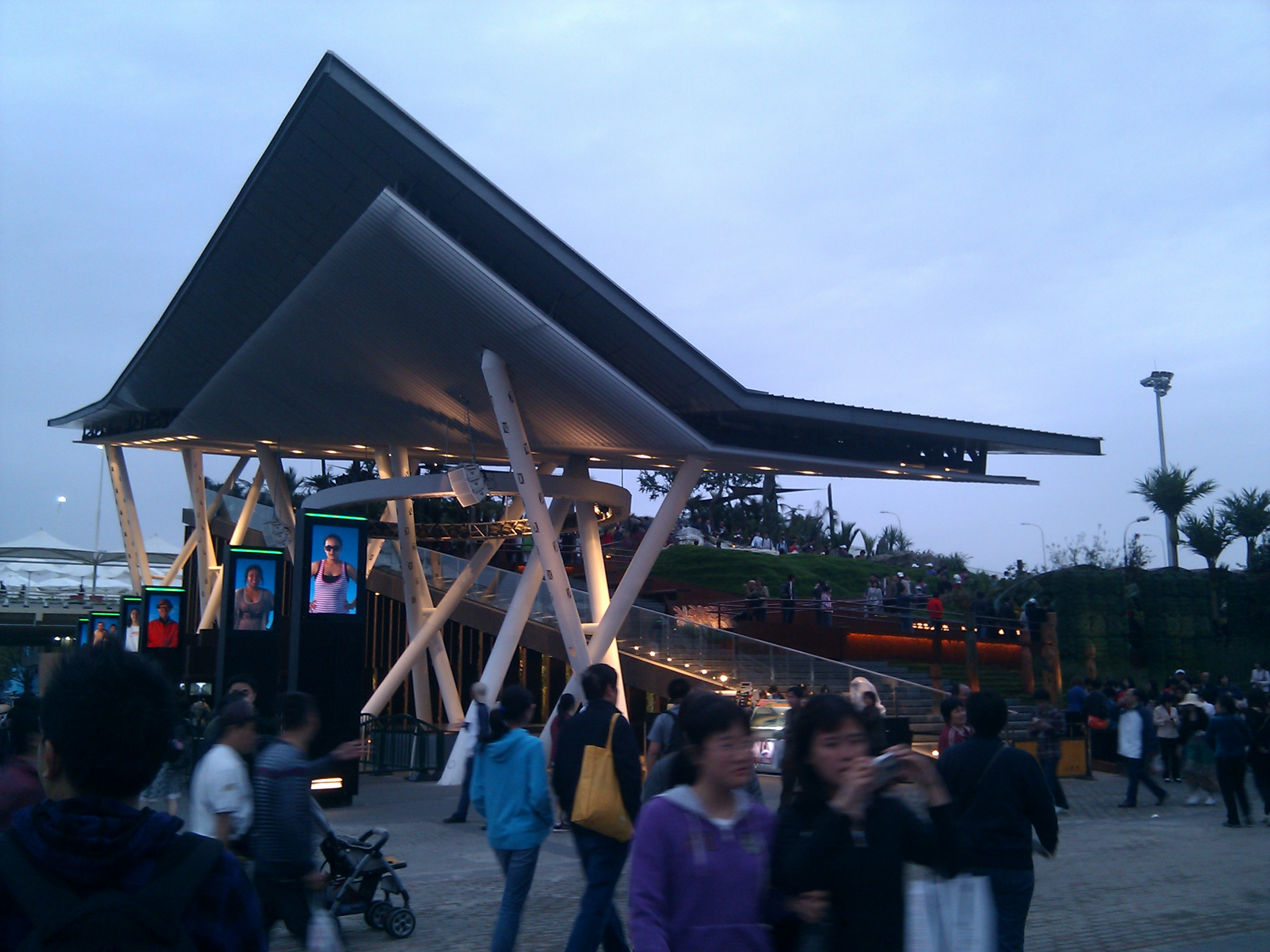
New Zealand Pavilion

The New Zealand Pavilion, nicknamed the Kiwi pavilion was guarded by a large steel and rubber 12-meter high native pōhutukawa tree. Because New Zealand is the world's first developed nation to sign a Free Trade Agreement with China, the pavilion was located near the China Pavilion.

The theme Cities of Nature: Living between land and Sky followed the history of New Zealand mixed with nature, modern living, economics and technology, and how it could make for a sustainable and a creative future. The pavilion's roof was landscaped with real native flora of New Zealand including a bubbling mud pool and a beautiful coastline. This rooftop garden was divided into four parts: Tropical Land, Farmland, Gondwanaland (pre-historic land) and a Thermal Wonderland, which displayed active geysers, sulphur craters, and an active volcano. In addition, part of the rooftop acted as a sheltered viewing platform overlooking the forecourt below which, during the expo, hosted various displays and live performances.

A newly carved giant Waka (Māori canoe) was also to be on show during the expo, and was expected to then be gifted to the people of China.

Another feature was a 1.8-tonne Greenstone (Pounamu/Jade) boulder which further symbolised the connection between China and New Zealand, as the rock is significant to both peoples.

The pavilion's interior took visitors on a hi-tech journey through time from New Zealand's earliest beginning to what it has achieved today.

=== Democratic People's Republic of Korea ===
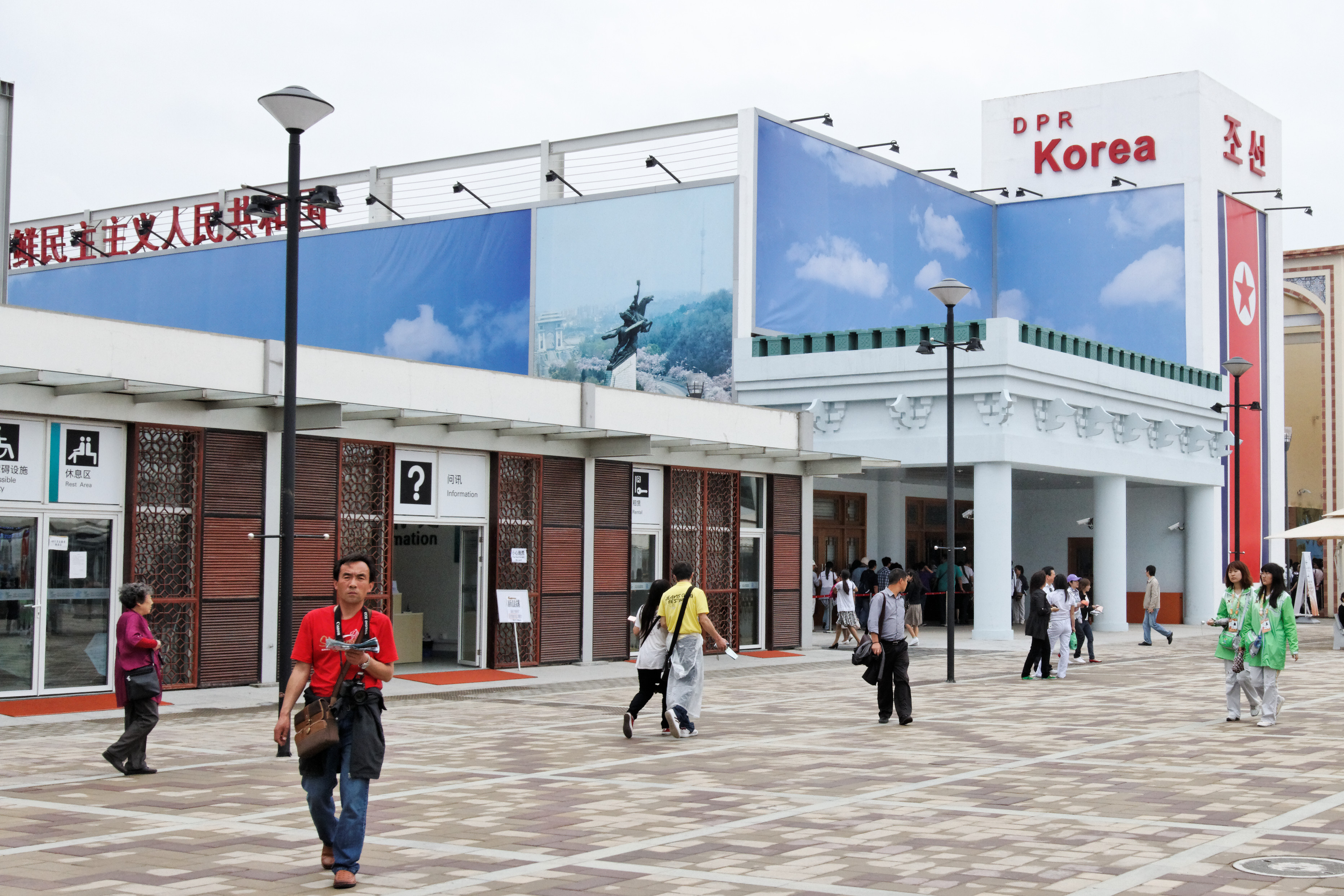
North Korea Pavilion

The North Korea Pavilion was the first exhibition from North Korea at any Expo. The pavilion contained a large exhibition hall including a sky-line view of Pyongyang, a small replica of Juche Tower, cultural and contemporary displays, and a souvenir counter. The souvenirs included works by Kim Jong-il, lapel pins, paintings, and a selection of North Korean music DVDs, some of which are also projected in the pavilion.

=== Nigeria ===
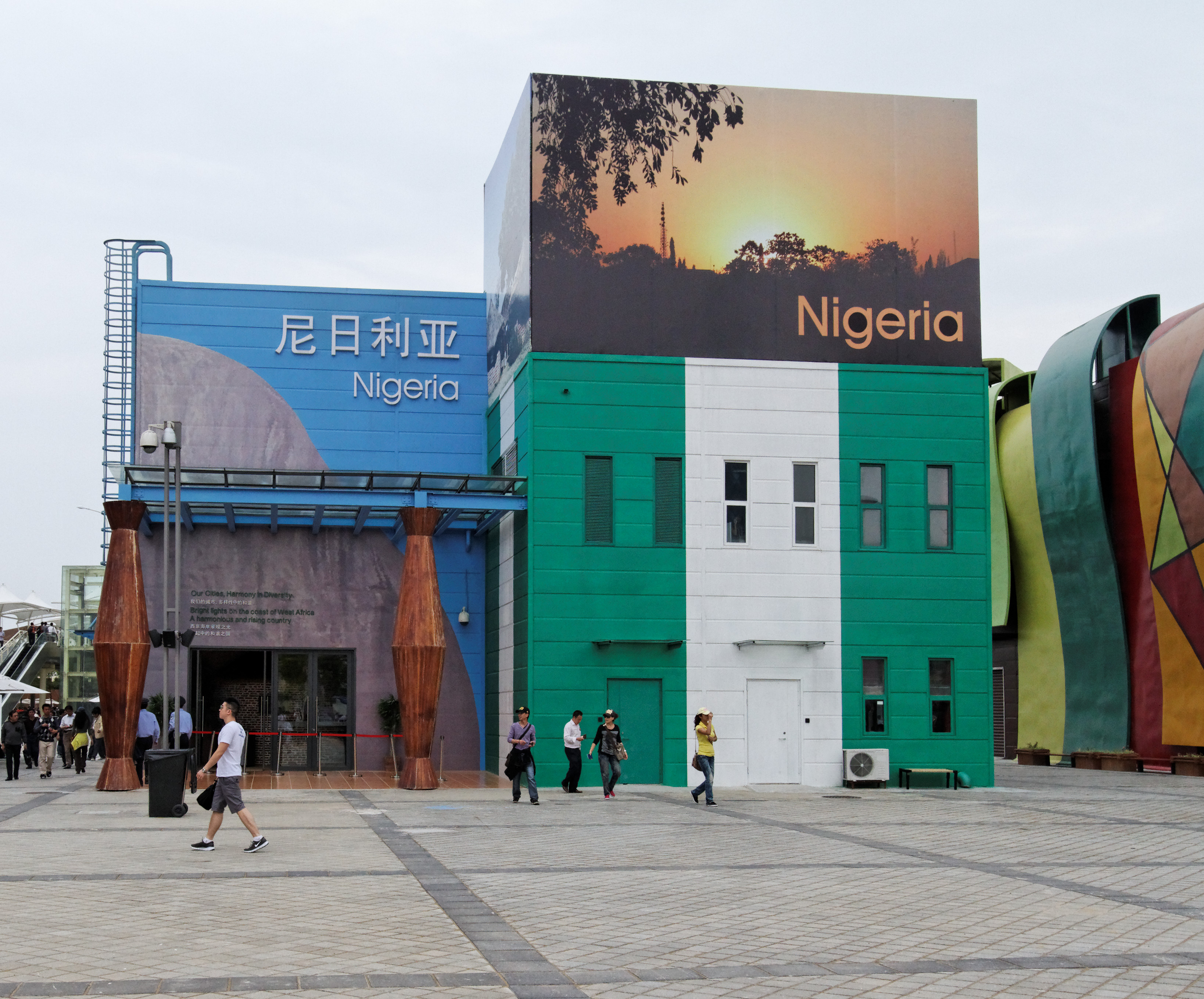
Nigeria Pavilion

The Nigeria Pavilion with a theme of Our Cities: Harmony in Diversity was in zone C, opposite to the joint Africa pavilion. Its exterior walls displayed a simulated Zuma Rock and showed the colors of the Nigerian flag.

=== Norway ===
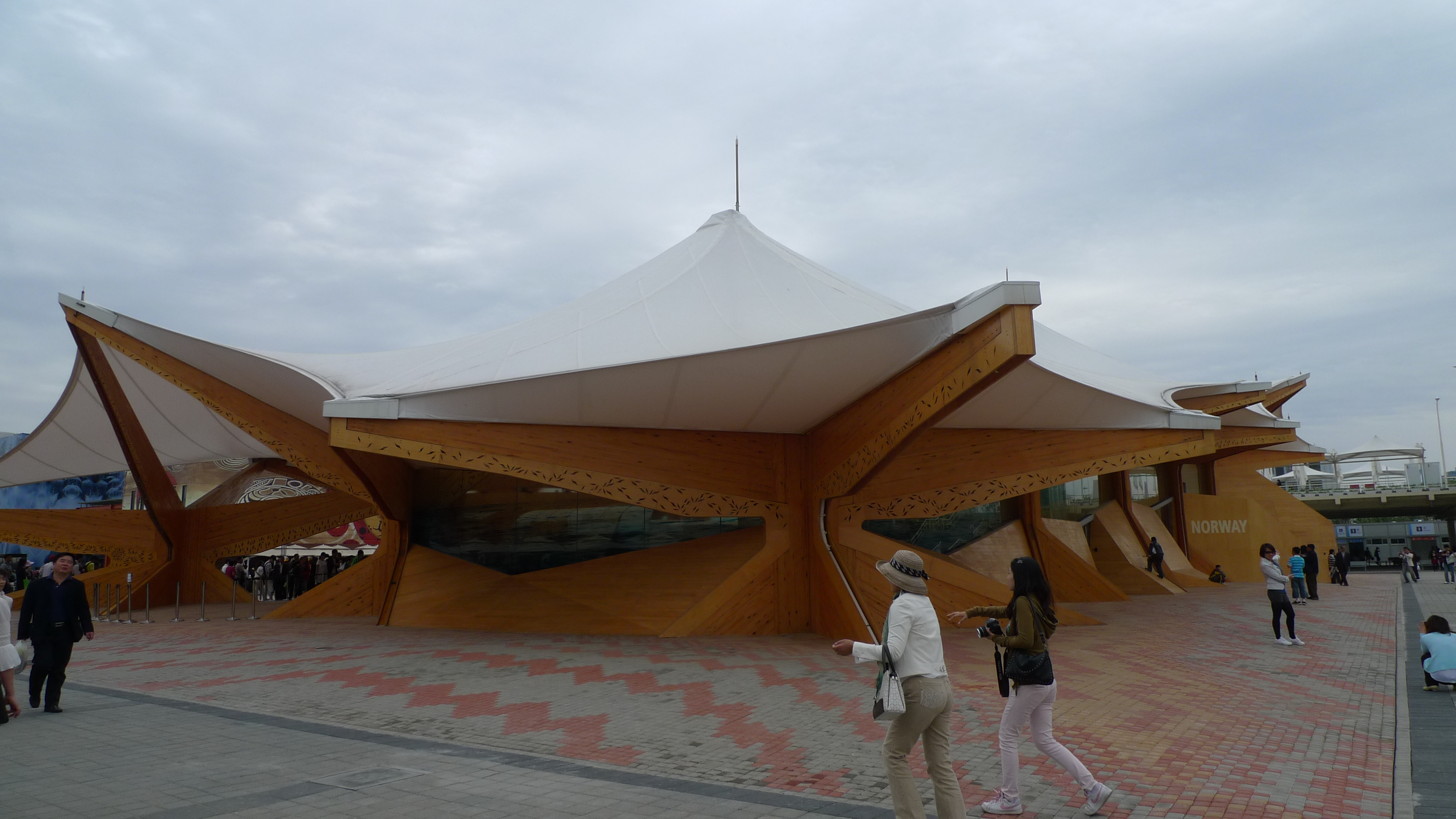
Norway Pavilion

The Norway Pavilion was constructed around 15 model trees made from Norway's pine trees and Chinese bamboo. The theme for the Norwegian pavilion was "Norway, powered by nature".

=== Oman ===
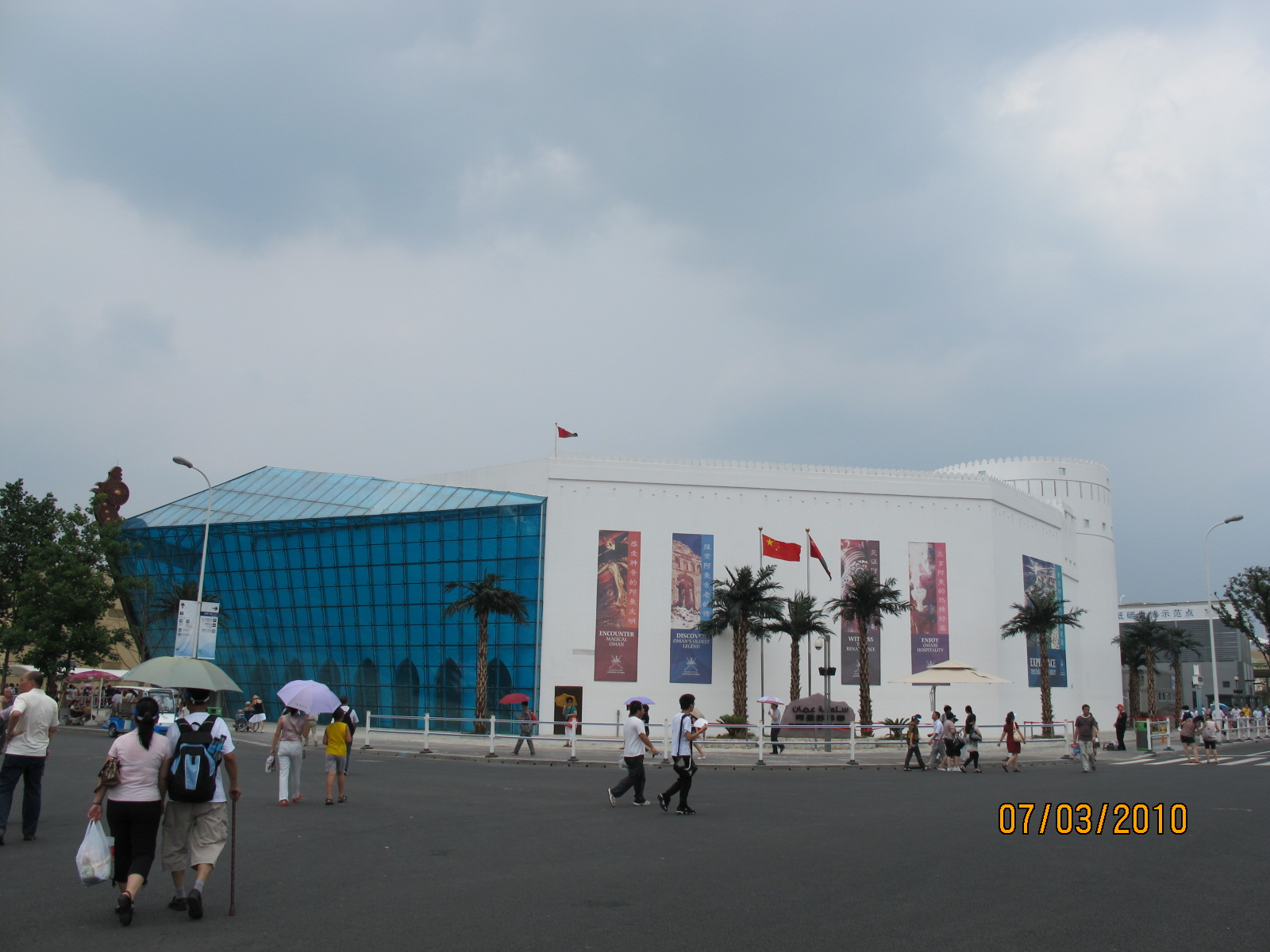
Oman Pavilion

The Oman Pavilion showcased the country's seafaring and architectural heritage. The front half of the pavilion resembled one of Oman's forts, such as those found in Sohar and Nizwa, which was attached to the front of a traditional Omani ship.

=== Pacific Pavilion ===
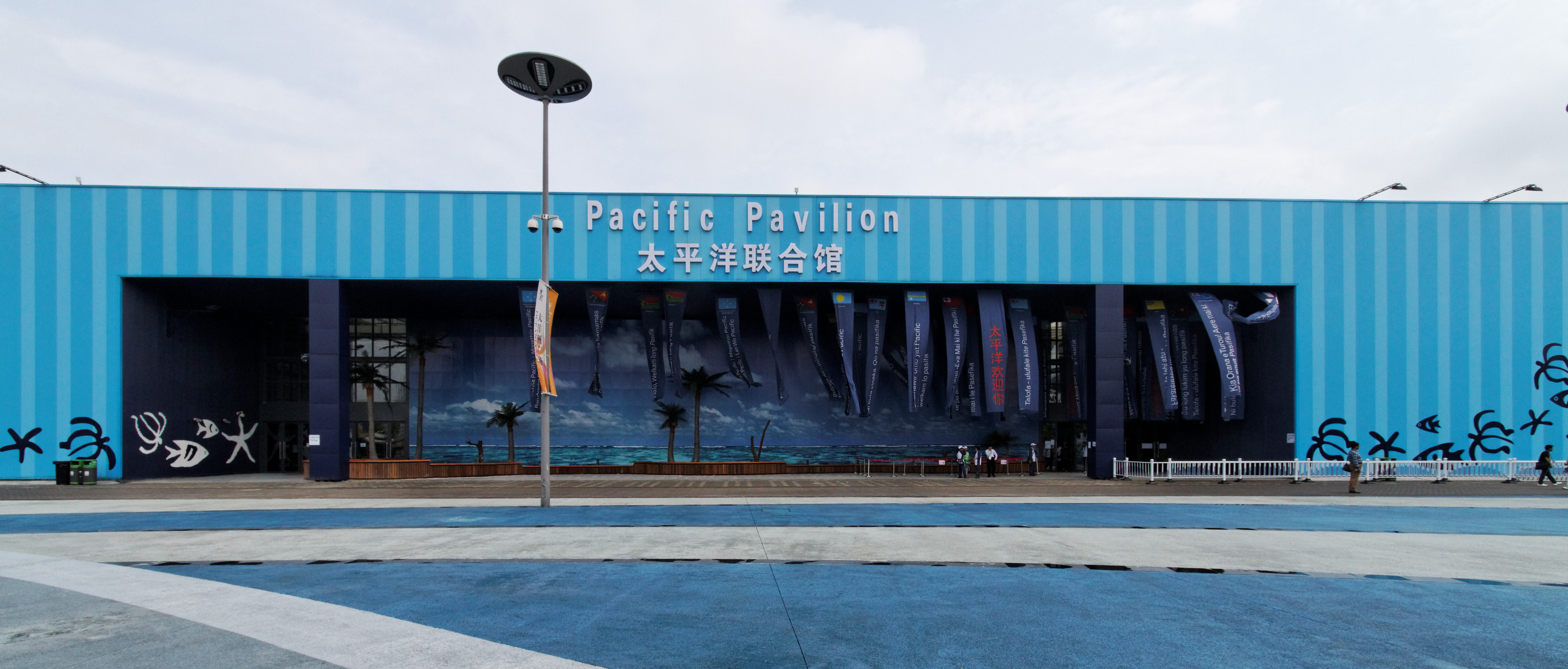
Pacific Pavilion

The Pacific Pavilion, which was the third largest national pavilion after China and the combined Africa pavilions, housed the stands and exhibitions of fifteen Pacific Island nations and French Polynesia. Countries participating in the pavilion included the Cook Islands, the Federated States of Micronesia, Fiji, Kiribati, the Marshall Islands, Nauru, Niue, Palau, Papua New Guinea, Samoa, the Solomon Islands, Tonga, Tuvalu, and Vanuatu. French Polynesia was also represented with its own exhibition stand. Additionally, The Pacific Islands Forum and the South Pacific Tourism Organisation exhibited within the pavilion. The Pacific Pavilion was located near the entrance to the Expo, adjacent to the China pavilion.

Each country within the Pacific Pavilion was assigned its own exhibition stand, which are all shaped like a vaka sail, though each nation was responsible for its own design. Much of the materials for the exhibits arrived in early April. The interior of the pavilion featured mobiles depicting postage stamps from each country. The pavilion was decorated throughout with exotic furniture from Fijian company Pacific Green. Large banners, designed by signage and art director Roger Huggett, were hung from the pavilion's entrance, displaying welcome signs written in various Pacific languages.

A soft opening, held before the official May 1 opening date, attracted 69,811 visitors to the Pacific Pavilion, despite the fact that only the French Polynesian booth was completed at the time.

==== Cook Islands ====
The Cook Islands exhibition was located within the Pacific Pavilion. The Chinese government covered the total $650,000 cost of the exhibit and travel expenses. The Cook Islands' stand, which included 324 square meters of exhibition space, was designed by Woods Creative of New Zealand. The stand, which was staffed by Chinese volunteers and Cook Islander expatriates living in China, Hong Kong, Japan, and South Korea, showed Cook Islander culture and local brands, such as Avaiki Cook Islands pearls.

==== Solomon Islands ====
The Solomon Islands exhibition, located in the Pacific Pavilion, exhibited more than four hundred cultural pieces, including art and handicrafts. The stand, which was chaired by Michael Tokuru, the general manager of Solomon Islands Visitors Bureau, promoted tourism, trade, and products produced in the Solomons. A giant carved nguzunguzu was positioned in front of the Solomon Islands booth to as a centerpiece of the attraction.

=== Pakistan ===
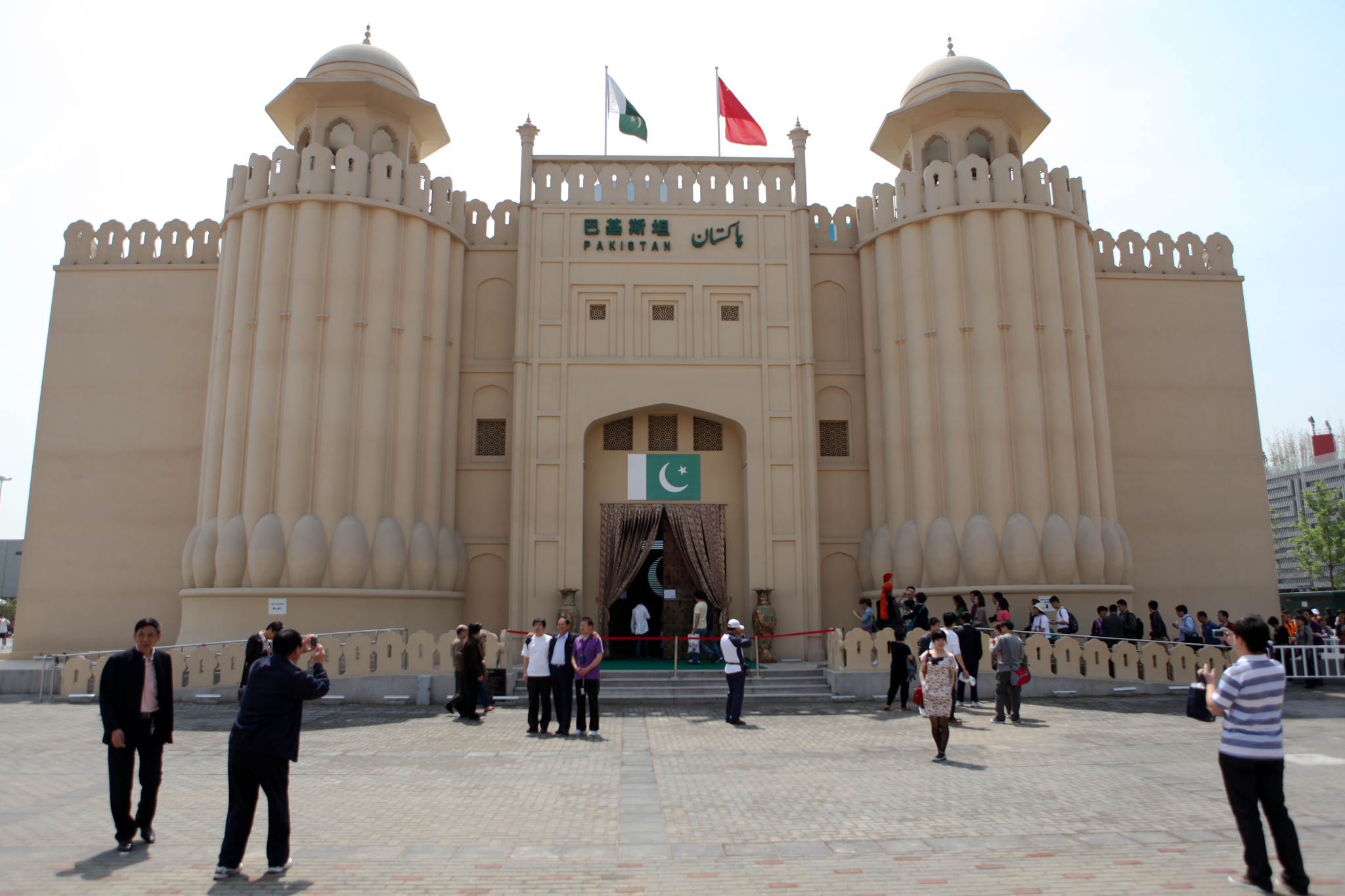
Pakistan Pavilion

The Pakistan Pavilion was themed harmony in diversity. The pavilion was shortlisted as one of the five most imaginative themes that engaged well with the overall theme of the Expo. It displayed various facets of urban living in the country in terms of the tradition, culture, modernity, and history. Located next to the Chinese pavilion, the two story exhibition was spread over an area of 2,000 square meters. The pavilion was built through a public-private partnership at a total cost of $6.8 million. The pavilion takes a realistic historical view of its theme. The façade boasted a replica of Alamgiri Gate of the Lahore Fort. The gatekeeper in traditional dress with frill turban attracted immediate attention. The interior offered glimpses of a former royal garden. Other features inside the pavilion gave visitors an understanding of the urban life in Pakistan through a range of visual aspects and multimedia presentations.

The three major highlights of the pavilion included:

- Culture, history, and diversity: The history of the country since the times of the Indus Valley civilization through Gandhara era, and the independence from British Raj. The model area exhibited a sculpture of Buddha, Minar-e-Pakistan, The Pakistan National Monument, and other monuments backed with audio-visual commentary.
- China-Pakistan friendship: The diversity of cultures, especially from the areas bordering with China. A 50-seat theater showcased the culture, natural scenery, and the oldest group game in the world, Polo.
- Dances and cuisines: There was an equal focus on the interaction between ancient customs and modern traditions. The pavilion hosted popular urban cuisines from across the country with dances that are symbolic of its provinces.

=== Peru ===
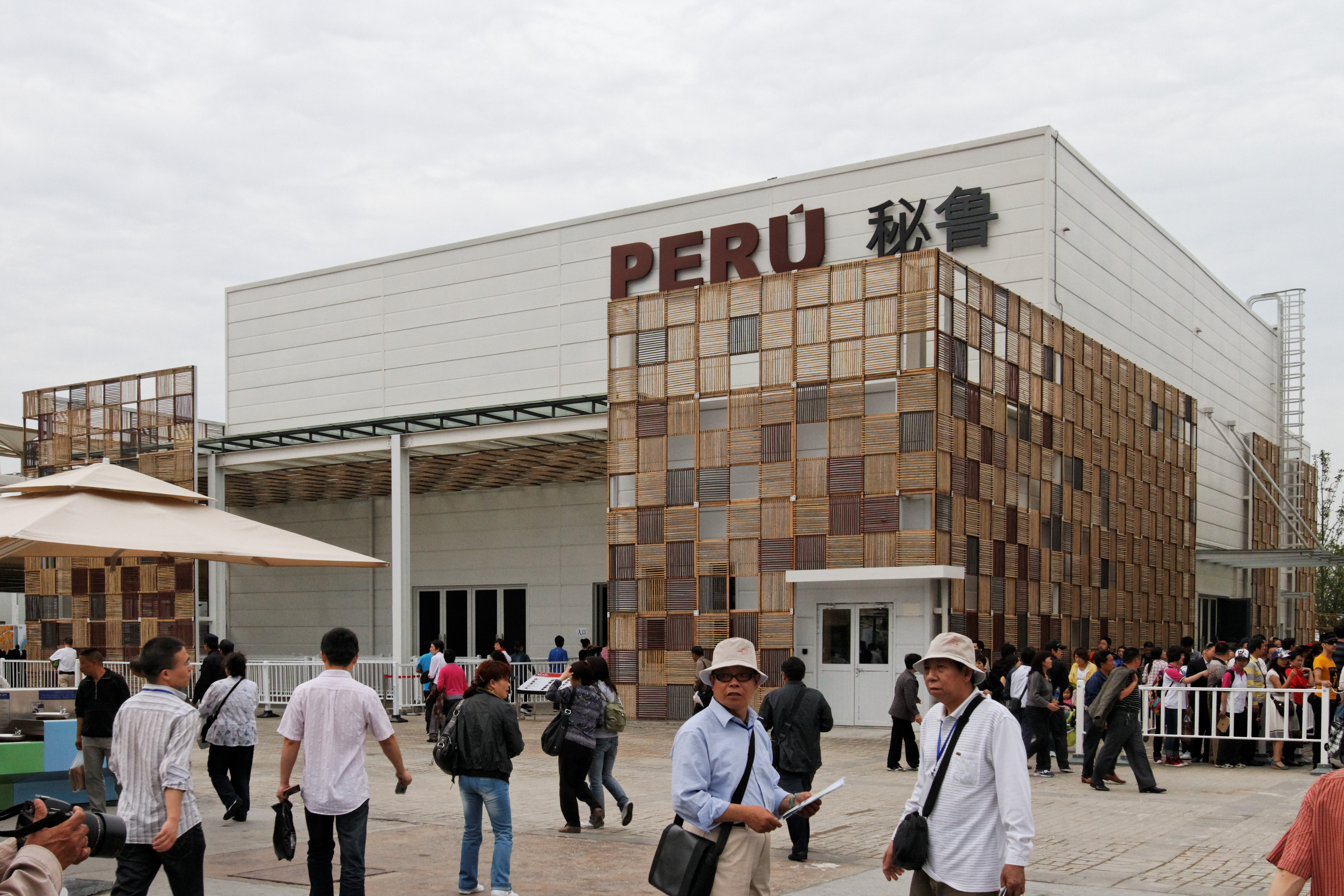
Peru Pavilion

The 1,000 m^{2} Peru Pavilion was themed as "Food Breeds the City" featuring a bamboo facade that simulates the material used by Peruvian highlanders immigrating to urban areas. Additionally, this pavilion showed the image of Mario Vargas Llosa, the 2010 Nobel Laureate in literature.

This pavilion showed Peru's cuisine and its vast rich culture which stem from its historical role at the center of the former Inca Empire.

=== Philippines ===
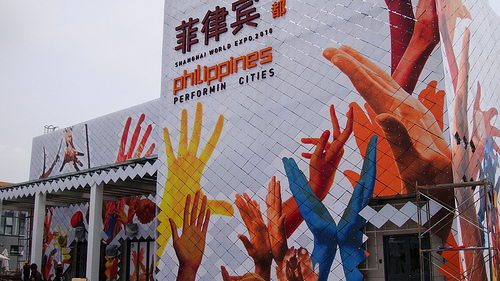
The Philippines pavilion

The 2,000 m^{2} Philippines Pavilion was designed to become the largest exhibition in the country's history at the World Expo. The theme of the pavilion was "Performing Cities."

Filipino architect Ed Calma's firm designed the building. A montage of giant hands, representing both well-known and ordinary Filipinos, featured across the pavilion's facade. The hands were meant "to emphasize the human dimension in urbanization, and to assert the Filipino's genius at (hand) crafting vital relationships through work, art, and play." The interior of the pavilion featured exhibitions, videos and performances showcasing the Philippines' best cities, based on standards used by the World Bank. The Filipino cities that featured at the Expo were Calbayog, Cebu, Davao, Iloilo City, Naga City, Makati, Manila, Malaybalay, Puerto Princesa, San Fernando City, La Union, and Taguig. Other exhibits included concerts, a boutique, and a cafe.

The pavilion featured daily performances by Filipino artists and entertainers, including the Philippine Philharmonic Orchestra, Ballet Philippines, the Philippine Madrigal Singers, pianist Cecille Licad, Joanna Go, Rachelle Gerodiea, and the group Kontra Gapi.

The estimated cost of the Philippines' participation in the Expo was PhP450 million. Half of the expenses covered by Filipino-Chinese chambers of commerce and half by corporate sponsors. President Gloria Macapagal Arroyo attended the Philippine Independence Day celebrations at the pavilion on June 9, a few days before the actual holiday.

=== Poland ===
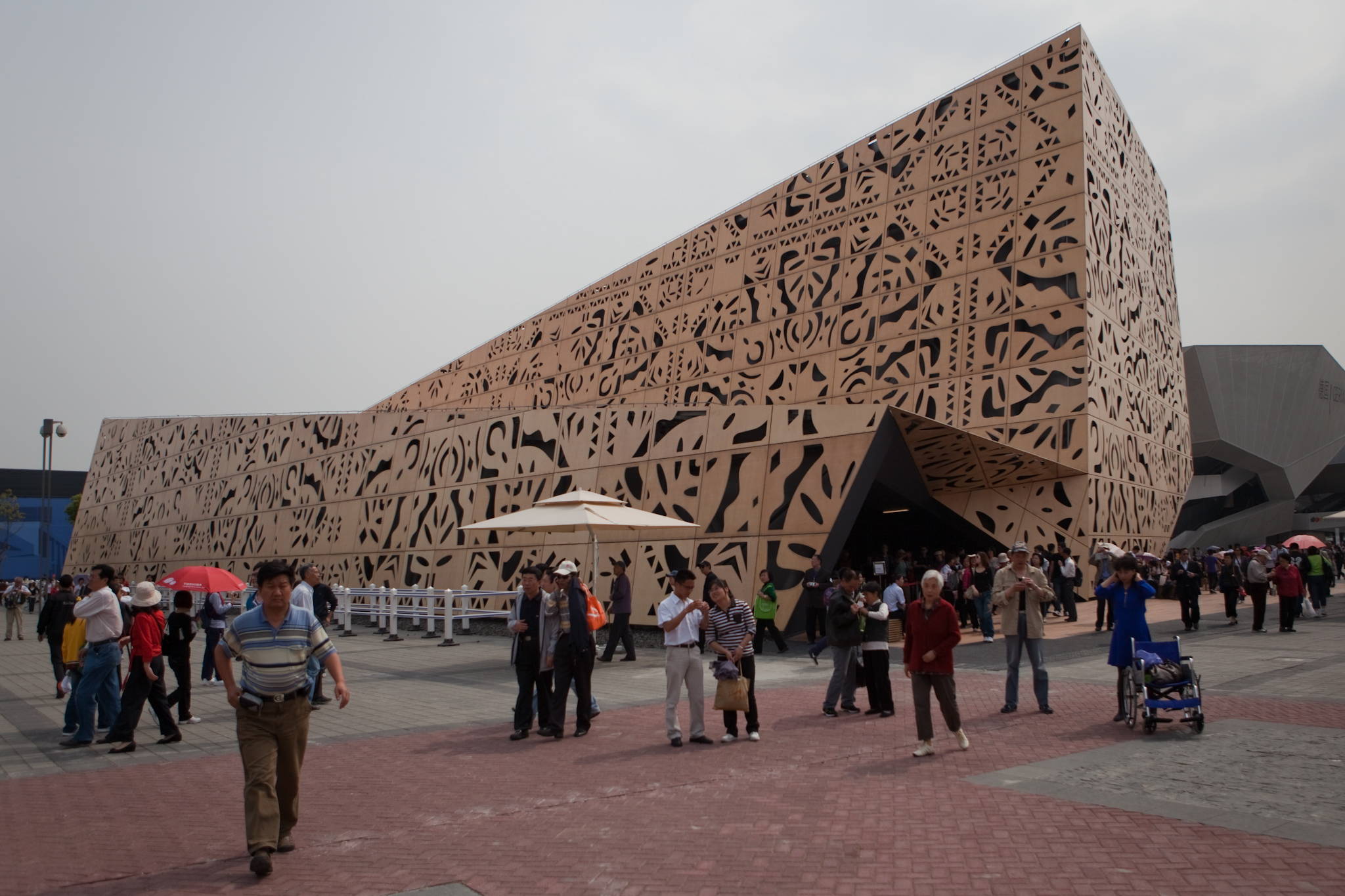
The Polish pavilion

The Poland Pavilion was opened on 1 May 2010 during a festive ceremony in the exhibition area of EXPO 2010 Shanghai. The design of the pavilion was created by Marcin Mostafa and Natalia Paszkowska of WWA Architects. The basic motif of the pavilion's construction was the national folk-art paper cut-out form known as wycinanki. The designers of this project wanted to translate folk patterns into the contemporary language of architectural form.

According to the official site, the pavilion welcomed its 5 millionth visitor on August 27, 2010.

=== Portugal ===
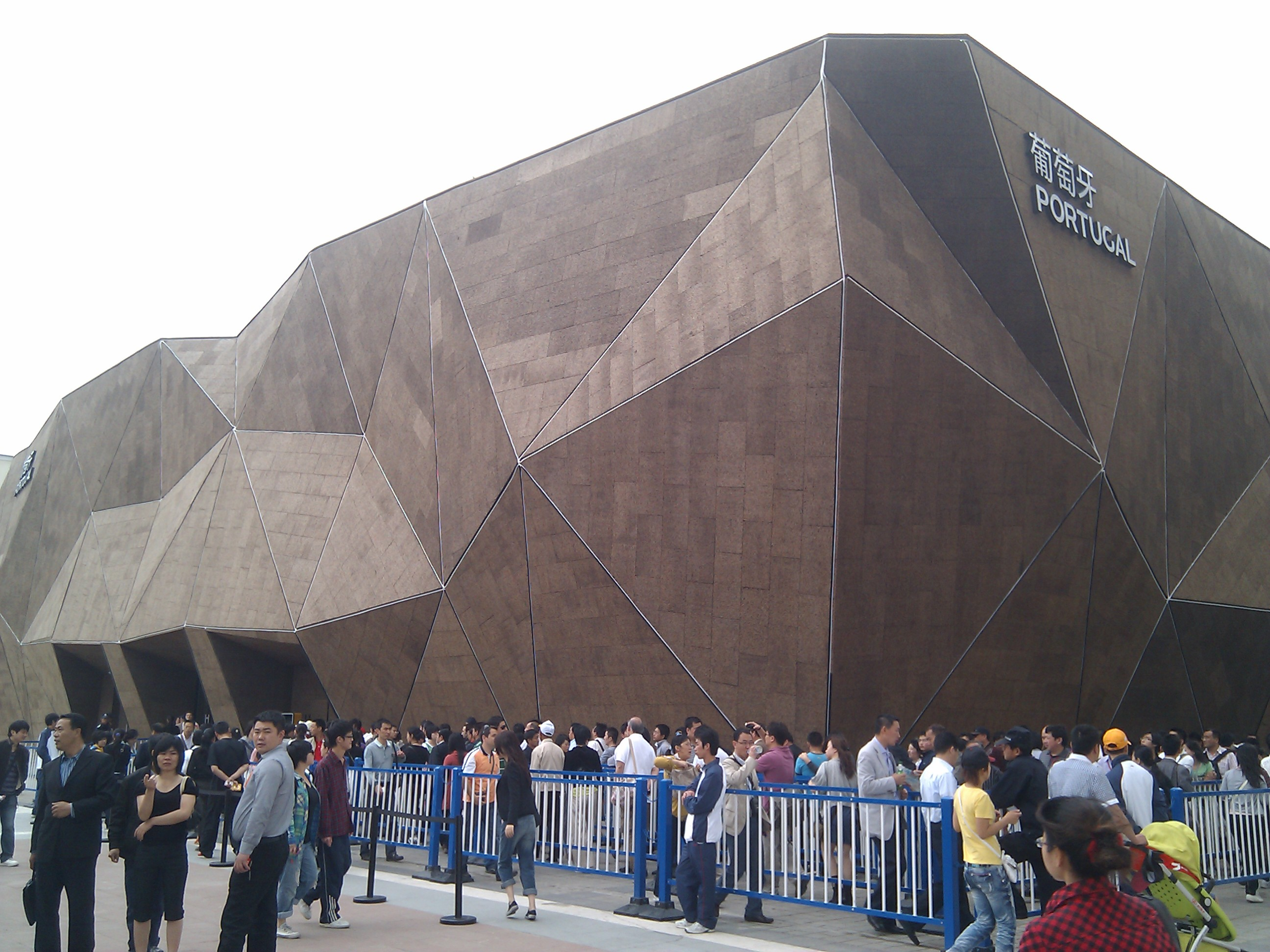
Portugal Pavilion

The Portugal Pavilion had an academic section on the ancient (trade) history and links between Portugal and China.

=== Romania ===
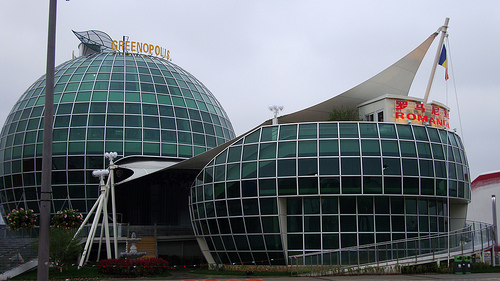
Romania Pavilion

The Romania Pavilion was built on a surface of about 2,000 m^{2}, and its design evolved around the color and environmental implications of "green," inspired by the apple, the most popular fruit in Romania and representing a "green city," healthy life and the concept of sustainable development. The exhibition included three sections——"Millennium in Retrospect", "Social and urban development promoted by history and nature" and "City life close to nature".

=== Russia ===
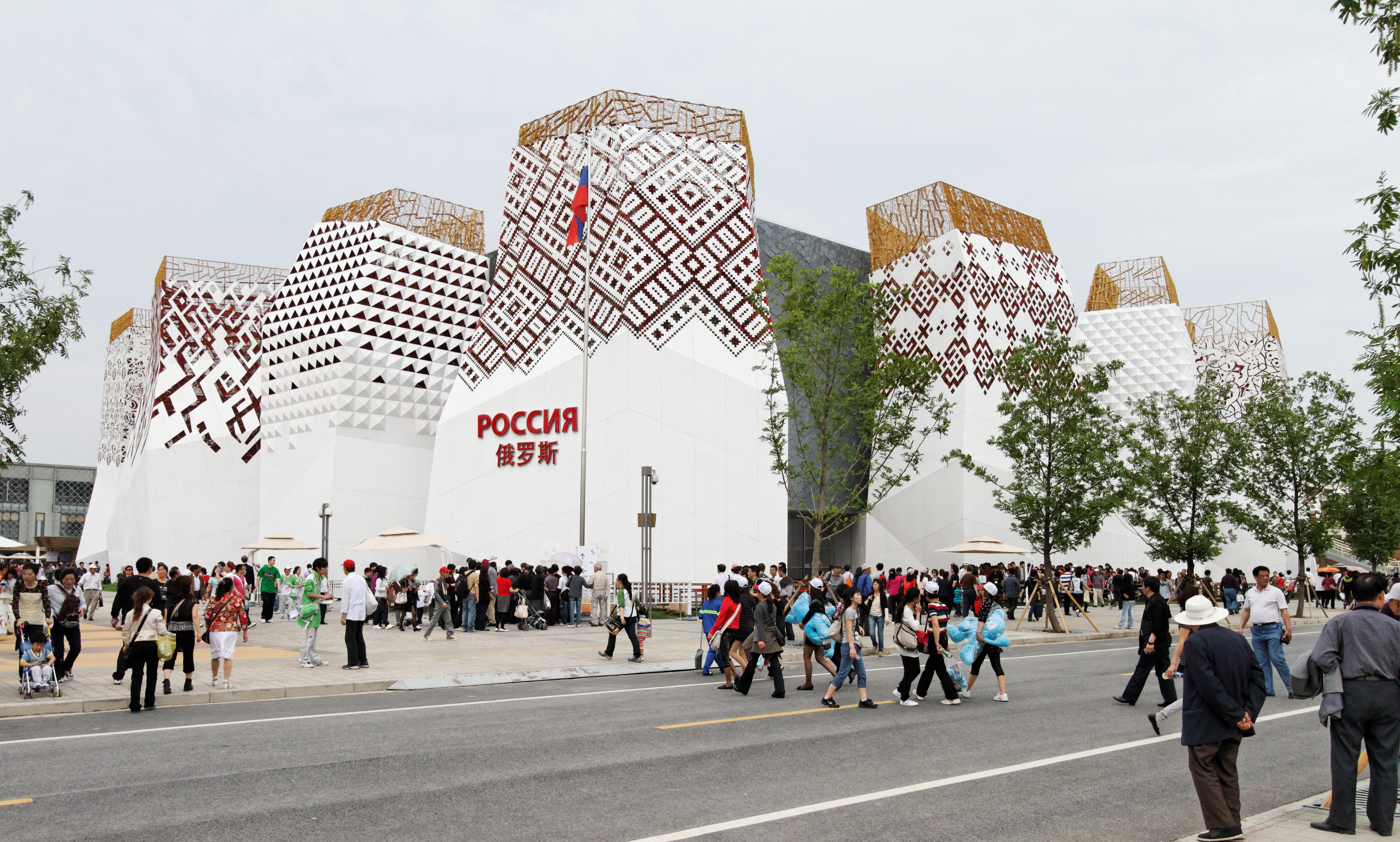
Russia Pavilion

The Russia Pavilion was the first exhibition Russia constructed at an expo in 30 years. It was one of the pavilions visited by CCP general secretary Hu Jintao when at the Expo.

The pavilion towers symbolized rapidly growing megalopolises with skyscrapers of a nonlinear architecture. The white-gold color of the towers resembled historical images of Russian architecture while the perforation of the upper tower parts was created based upon ethnic ornaments of the peoples who populate Russia.

The pavilion plan, similar to the outlay of a Slavic settlement, symbolized "the flower of life" or the sun, roots of "the world tree" (a spreading oak among the Slavs) where "the life heavens" lie. The towers "roots" were oriented to the center of the composition and support "the civilization cube" connected with a symbol "man".

The elements of the cube's external decoration could move and that organizes huge surfaces of "the living facade" which by reflecting the sky, the towers, greenery and people created an image of a giant living being in daytime. At night with the help of special lighting, an even more stunning effect of the changing light-color-dynamic screen was created.

The narrative demonstration slogan represented in the Russian pavilion was: better city is the city of a dream, happiness, a good place for children to live in. Original children's ideas, youth projects and inventions will let dip into the future. As today's children are those who will live on the Earth tomorrow, they will build new cities, make scientific discoveries and implement them in life

=== Saudi Arabia ===
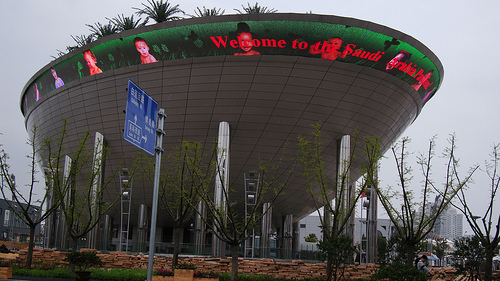
The Saudi Arabia pavilion

Built on a plot of 7,600 m^{2}, the Saudi Arabia Pavilion was the second largest after the China's national pavilion in terms of area and height, Saudi Arabia spent $164 million on its pavilion, which was the highest figure spent by one nation amongst all visiting countries. The pavilion was designed to resemble a giant oil tanker.

The centerpiece of the Saudi Arabia pavilion featured a huge hanging boat shaped like a half moon. Date palms were planted on the top deck of the "moon boat", creating a hanging garden and thus epitomizing oases in the desert. Visitors were welcomed to the pavilion in both modern, as well as traditional, Bedouin tents set among date palm trees. The Saudi government imported the date palms and a full mosque for the expo. A large screen, estimated to be the size of a soccer field, projected images of King Abdullah meeting with CCP general secretary Hu Jintao. The Saudi Pavilion marked more than four million visitor by the end of the Expo and the pavilion was one of a few that remained standing when the Expo was concluded.

The Saudi Pavilion saw a number of heads of state and government as well as celebrities visiting including Robert De Niro, Liv Tyler and Yao Ming. The public figures were received by the pavilion's director of Media Khalid Altowelli and other members of the Saudi Pavilion management.

China is Saudi Arabia's fastest growing trading partner. A large stage within the pavilion was used to unveil joint Saudi-Chinese business deals, including a new railway between the cities of Mecca and Medina, which will be constructed by a Chinese firm.

According to the official site, the pavilion welcomed its 2 millionth visitor on August 1, 2010.

The Pavilion re-opened in July 2011 to welcome further guests to experience the 1400sqm flyover screen and will finally close on 8 October 2016. Over 7 million visitors will have visited the pavilion between May 2010 and its closing.

As of June 2017, the pavilion has had all internal components removed and is now being demolished to allow for new construction to be completed on the site.

=== Serbia ===
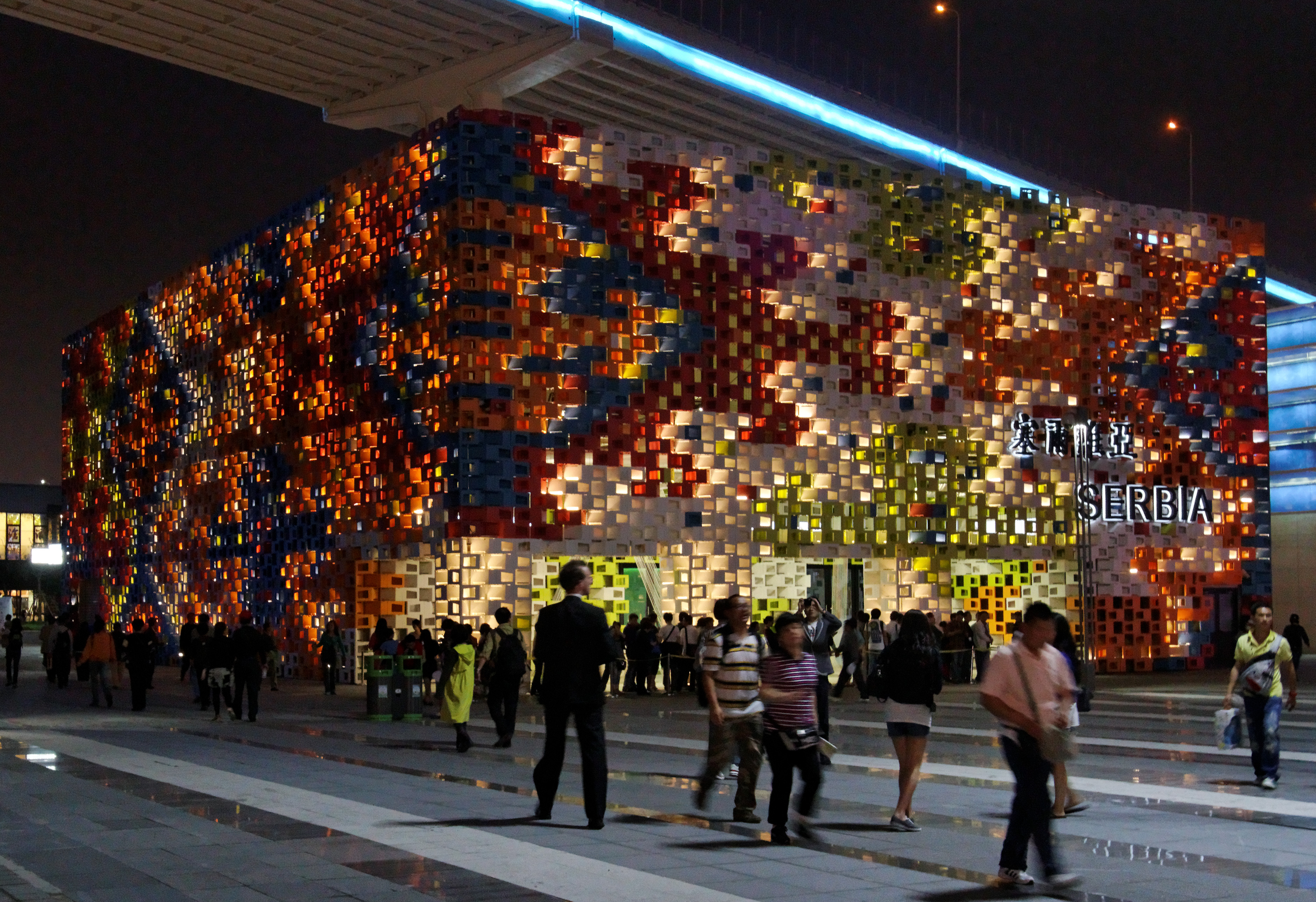
Serbian pavilion at night

The Serbia Pavilion was located in so-called European Square, in the west side of zone C. It has 1,000 m^{2} in size. The exhibition theme was City Code. The pavilion was opened by the Serbian Foreign Minister Vuk Jeremić. The pavilion was built in the process of weaving, merging and matching modular parts that represent the Pirot rug theme. Modules were made of metal, plastic and porcelain affixed upon networks of wedges and cables. Serbian National Day is June 27 when the pavilion hosted Serbian Prime Minister Mirko Cvetković, an investment forum and many cultural events including series of concerts by Slobodan Trkulja and his band Balkanopolis. The Serbian pavilion also featured a visit by actor Bata Živojinović.

=== Singapore ===
The music-box-like Singapore Pavilion was a two-story structure with an "Urban Symphony" theme. The theme was inspired by the harmony of unique elements in Singapore: progress and sustainability, urbanization and greenery, tradition and modernity and a cosmopolitan mix of residents of different races living peacefully together.

The Singapore Pavilion.

The two environmental aspects that Singapore has successfully tackled in balancing progress with sustainability – water and garden – formed the softscape of the pavilion as its two design elements. The pavilion incorporated an orchestra of elements into its design – music fountains, an interplay of sounds and visuals and roof garden flora, with the country's unique rhythm and melody.

Unique Design supported by four columns of different profiles, the entire structural system featured floors of different shapes and sizes, connected by ramps and stairs suspended from trusses to form a tensional balance, which symbolized a harmonious coexistence of people who live, work and vacation in Singapore.

Architect: Kay Ngee Tan, Exhibition Director: Singapore Tourism Board, Creative Director: Jay Phua, Production Director: Walter Lim.

There was a "Hanging Garden", a rooftop garden landscaped with exotic flora and music fountains. Here visitors received a first-hand feel of Singapore as a Garden City.

=== South Korea ===
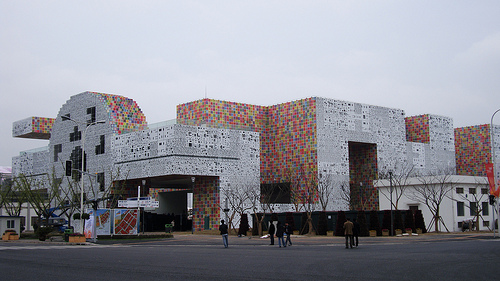
South Korea Pavilion

The South Korea Pavilion was a three-story building with the exterior decorated in the 20 basic letters of the Korean alphabet. South Korean President Lee Myung-Bak and his wife opened the pavilion in Shanghai on May 1. Korea also had a separate corporate pavilion to showcase its wares to its largest trading partner, China.

The pavilion won second prize for category A pavilion design.

=== Spain ===
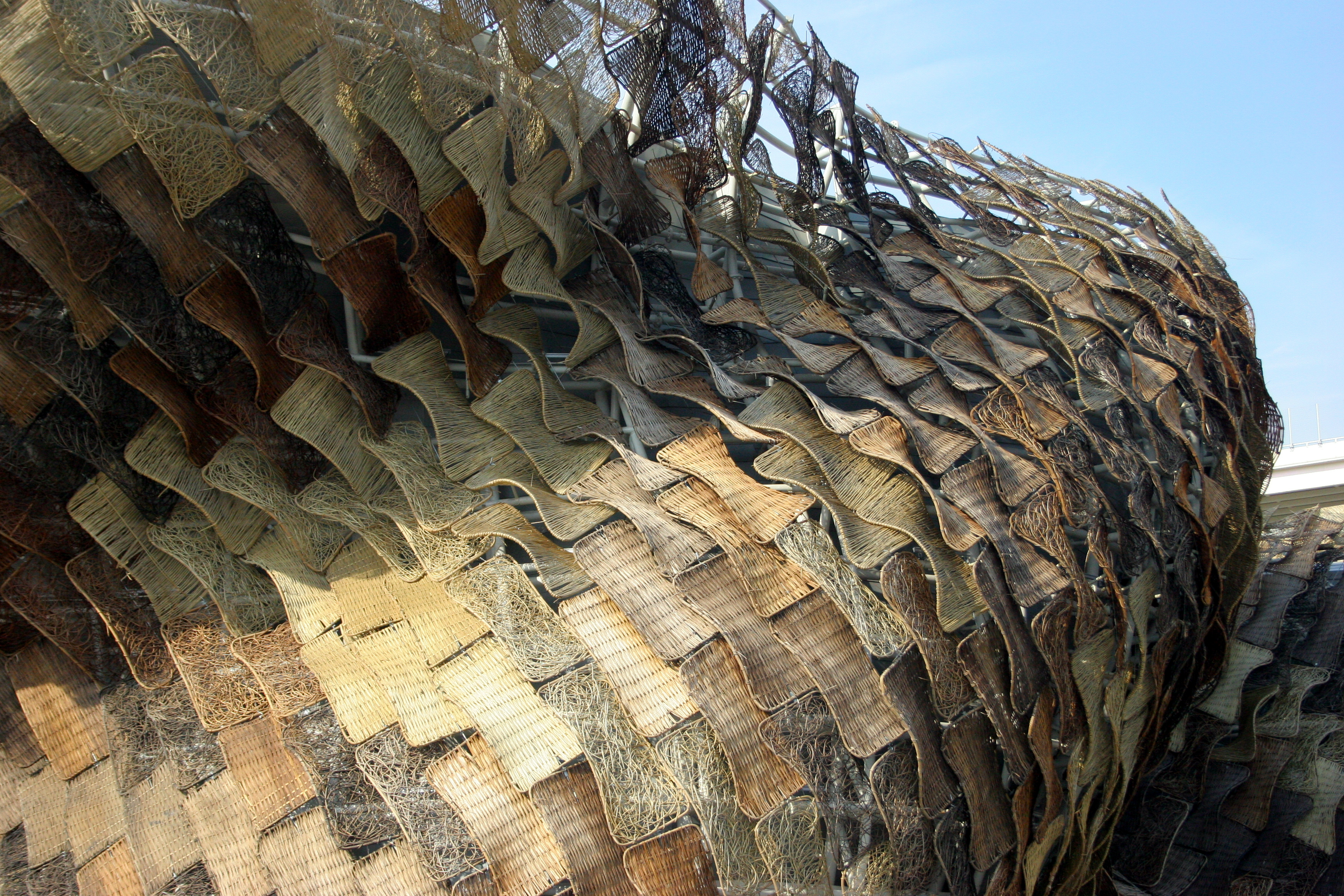
detail of the Spanish pavilion

Spain Pavilion was remarkable for its wicker facade, designed by the Spanish architect studio EMBT Miralles-Tagliabue, it commemorates the resemblance in both textile cultural background of both Spain and China, wishing to unite the two cultural countries with a symbol with this wicker basket technique, the exterior undulate walls hides special meanings to Chinese characters embedded in the facade.

The pavilion comprised three exhibition halls designed by the UTE Empty- Noe Special Concept design. The three exhibition halls featured a movie by Bigas Luna in the first exhibition hall, a technological giant projection screen room in hall 2 and in the future hall #3 a giant baby by the celebrated Spanish-Catalan director Isabel Coixet.

According to the official website, the Spain pavilion welcomed its 4 millionth visitor on August 10, 2010.

The building won the 2012 International Architecture Award for the best new global design.

=== Sweden ===
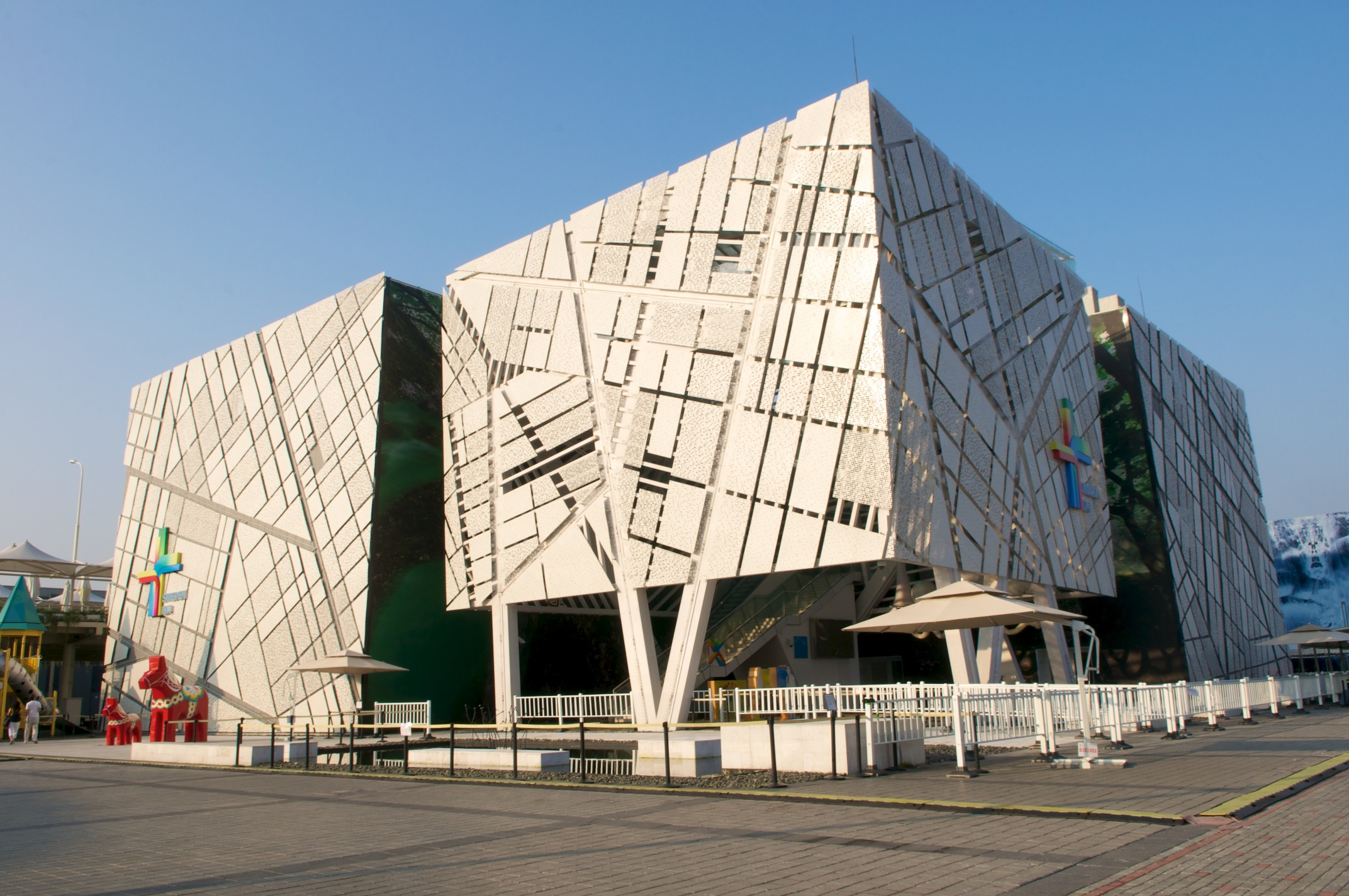
Sweden pavilion

The overall theme of the Sweden Pavilion was "The Spirit of Innovation". This theme was reflected in the architecture of the pavilion, the exhibition and the activities hosted by the pavilion during the Expo. It was distinguished by a large outdoor atrium with a rooftop bar, and the exhibition focused on Sweden as a nation of problem solvers in the areas of urban environment and quality of life. The exhibition contained many interactive elements and outside hosted a popular slide.

=== Taiwan ===
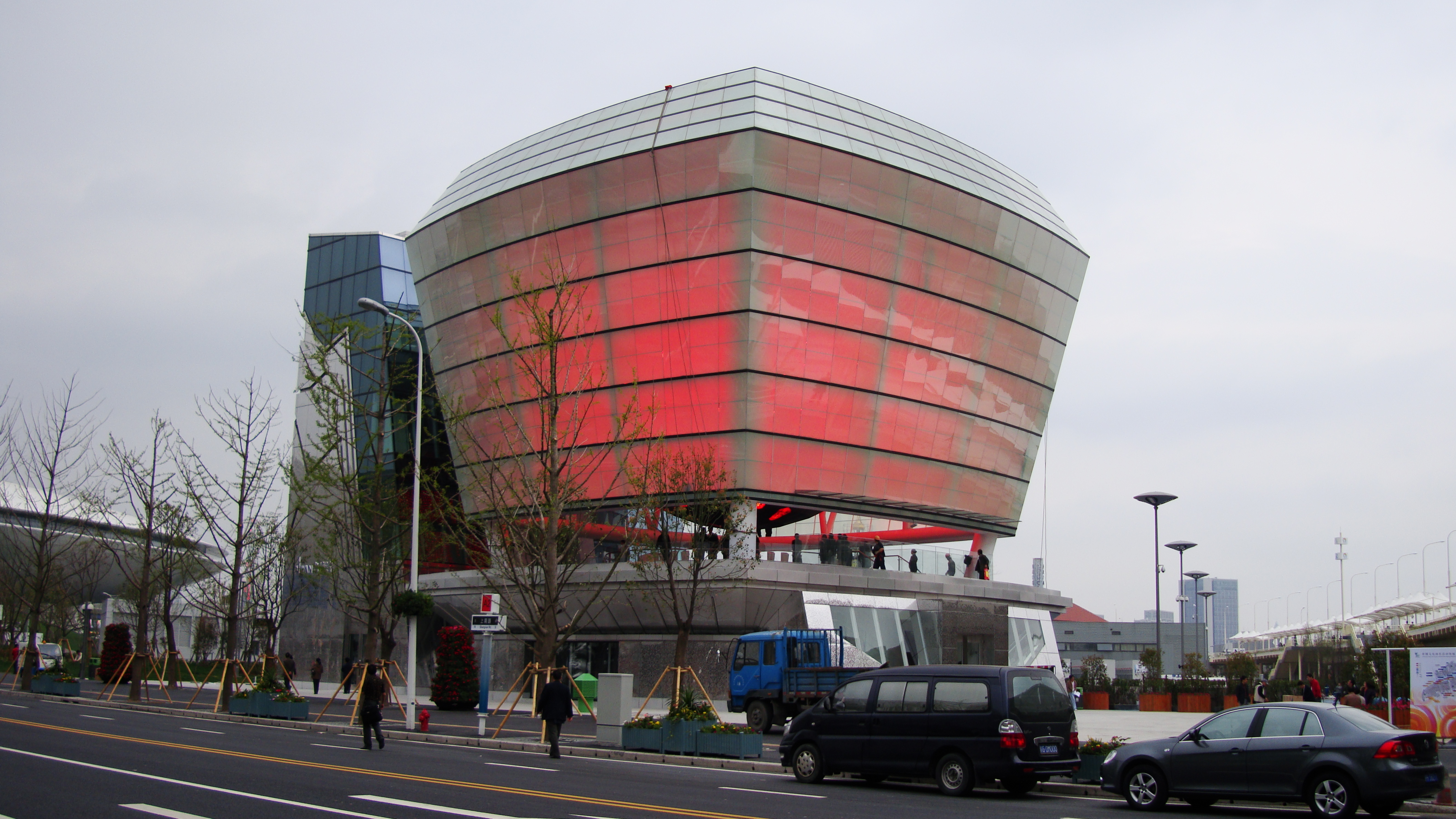
Taiwan (Republic of China) Pavilion

The Taiwan Pavilion, created by C. Y. Lee, was designed to resemble a lantern and parts of Taipei 101. In the center of the pavilion a gigantic round LED screen projected images of Taiwan and its culture.

After Expo 2010 concluded, the pavilion was disassembled and shipped to Hsinchu, where it has become a permanent attraction.

=== Thailand ===
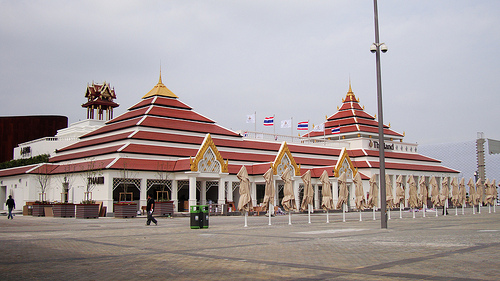
Thailand Pavilion

The Thailand Pavilion had three separate chambers. While interchanging three large groups of people around the building, visitors could sense and briefly experience the beauties and wonders of the country.

In front of the building was an "Intarachit" (Indrajit) commonly seen guarding Thai temples and sacred areas in Thailand. The two statues represented the long-lasting relational bond between China and Thailand. The first part of the exhibition contained a miniature outdoor gallery, surrounded by water features and a traditional Naga fountain, the host sometimes entertained waiting visitors by teaching simple Thai vocabulary before entering the pavilion. The first chamber of the pavilion's main attraction was a four-sided screen with rainwater features, where visitors could view videos of Thai culture. Below the screen was a water theme, featuring projected lotus ponds and other objects relating to the movie screened above, giving an impression of a "Thai" environment.

The second chamber projected a 360° clip, explaining Thai history and the four eras of prosperity, from the Sukhothai era, when King Ramkhamhaeng the Great invented the Thai alphabet to the present Rattanakosin Kingdom. While traveling in time between eras, art designs of the specific era or "Lai Thai" (ลายไทย) could be seen decorating the plain pillars around to room.

The last assembly room included a 3D movie about tourism in Thailand, which featured Siam Paragon, one of the largest shopping complexes in Southeast Asia, along with Siam Ocean World, the largest aquarium in Southeast Asia. The pavilion also featured Thai cuisine, provided by Thai Airways, and a Souvenir Shop, packed with delicate collectables. The exterior of the building was decorated with Thai decorations, traditional roofs and delicate designs.

=== Timor-Leste ===
The Timor-Leste pavilion featured traditional architectural elements, including a Lospalos-style roof, carved wooden doors, processed palm leaves, and a display of local handicrafts. The exhibit utilized specialized lighting in showcasing the nation's natural landscapes along with depictions of daily community life and work, representing the harmonious coexistence between humanity and nature.

=== Turkey ===
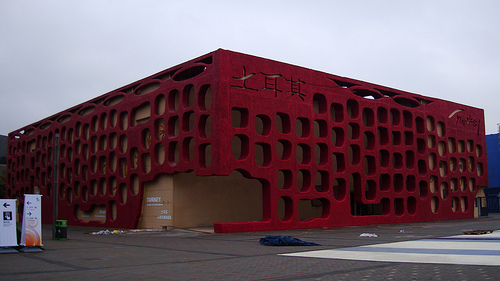
Turkey Pavilion

The design for the exterior of the 2,000 m^{2} Turkey Pavilion was derived from one of the first known settlements in the world called Çatalhöyük, the center of advanced culture in the Neolithic period. The pavilion looked like a red and beige box with an animal sculpture.

=== United Arab Emirates ===
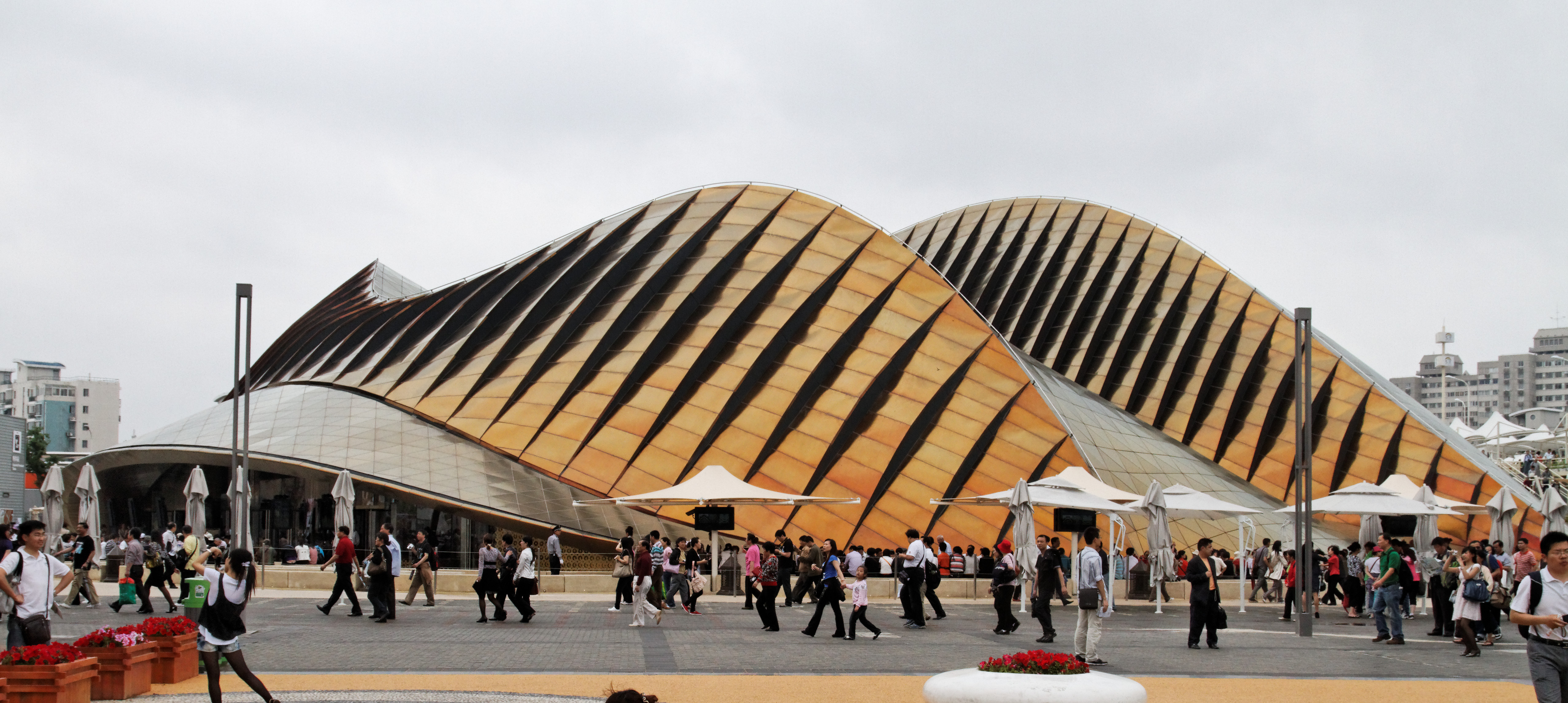
United Arab Emirates Pavilion

The United Arab Emirates Pavilion, created by British architect Lord (Norman) Foster, was designed to resemble a sand dune. The building, which was constructed of gold-colored glass, was curved to imitate the natural formations of the leeward and windward sides of the sand dunes found in the U.A.E. Foster's design also drew attention to the country's traditional Bedouin culture.

After Expo 2010 finished the pavilion was moved to Saadiyat Island in Abu Dhabi in UAE

=== United Kingdom ===
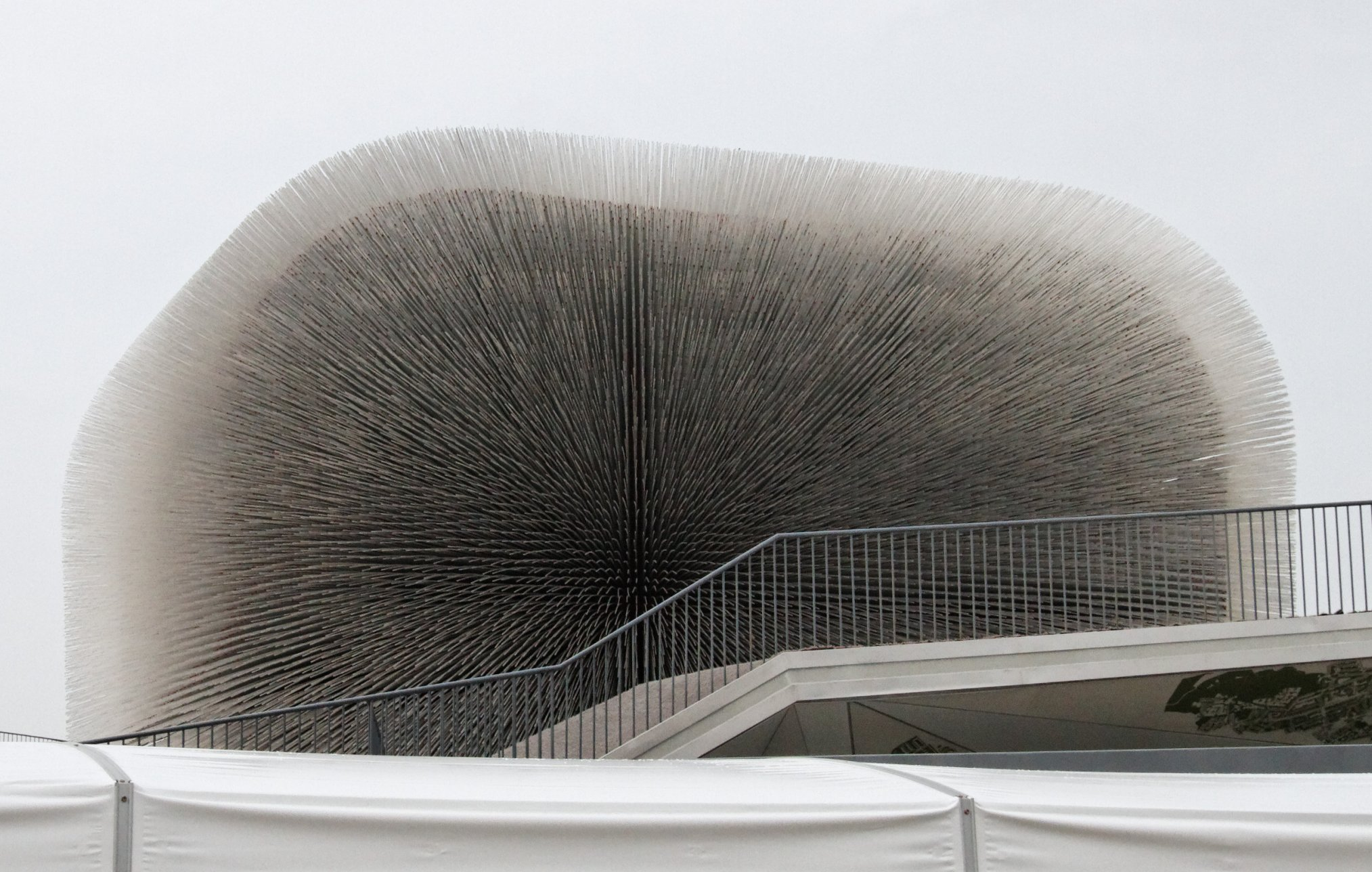
UK Pavilion

The budget for the UK Pavilion was approximately £25m, with £2.5m provided by private sector sponsors and the rest by the UK Government. The pavilion was built with 60,000 translucent acrylic rods which produced effects when the wind blew and was given the name "Seed Cathedral" and nicknamed the "Dandelion". The pavilion won the title of Best Pavilion at the Expo. The Pattern of the Union Jack flag could be seen faintly from the outside of the pavilion if one looked closely.

=== United States ===
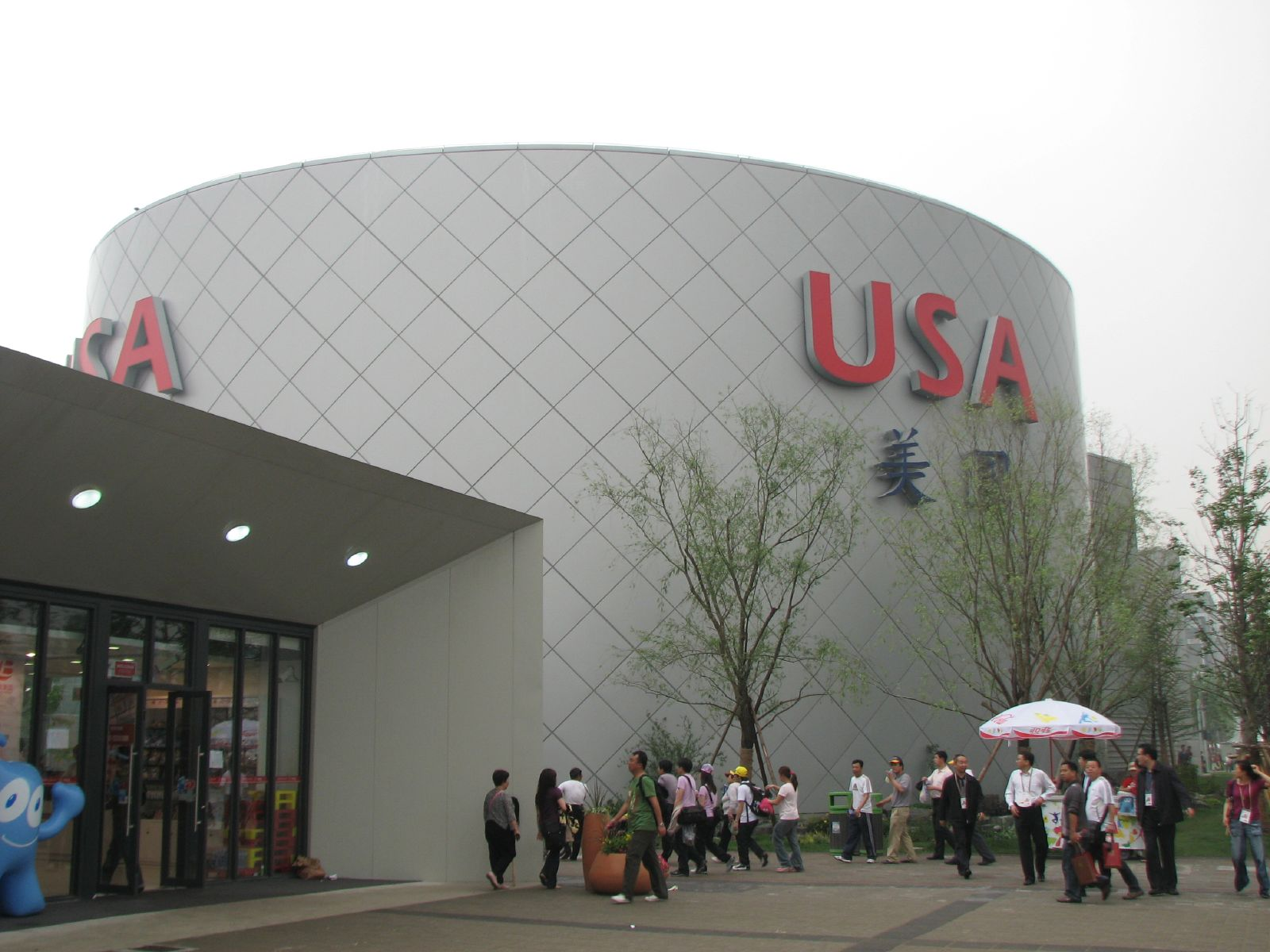
USA Pavilion

The USA Pavilion was one of the last of the 192 participating countries to sign up for involvement with the Expo. As of August 31, 2010, the pavilion reported that attendance had surpassed 4.7 million and was averaging more than 41,000 people per day. On September 30, 2010, the pavilion welcomed its 6 millionth visitor. Entertainment was provided at the US Pavilion on an ongoing basis with live performances by various US artists. Performers during the opening weeks of Expo 2010 included the Philadelphia Orchestra, Dee Dee Bridgewater and Herbie Hancock.

The U.S. Pavilion, with its theme of "Rising to the Challenge", was a gray steel structure designed to resemble an eagle with its wings outstretched to welcome pavilion visitors. The 60,000-square-foot (5,600 m^{2}) pavilion, constructed largely from glass and steel, was designed by Canadian architect Clive Grout.

The show aspects of the Information and Communication Pavilion were conceived and produced by Bob Rogers (designer) and his Burbank, California-based firm, BRC Imagination Arts.

The U.S. Pavilion at the 2010 Shanghai Expo was notable as per it having been the only national pavilion at the Expo, and the only U.S. Pavilion in recent history, solely funded by private financial contributions, coming from approximately 60 multinational corporations.

=== Venezuela ===
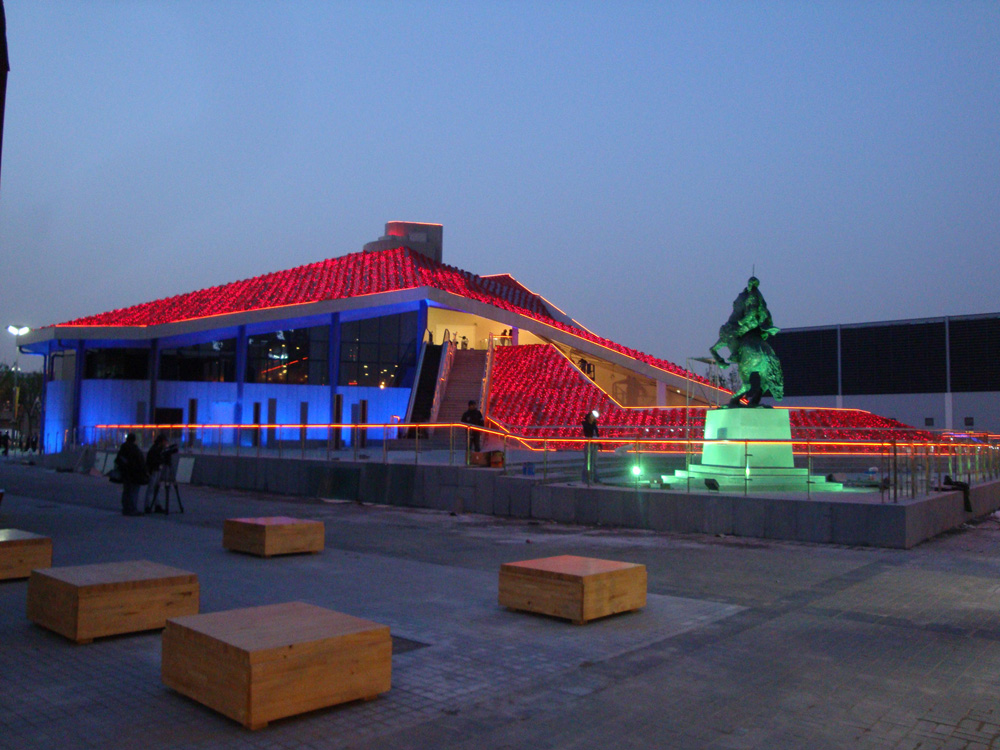
Venezuela pavilion at night

The 3,000 sq. meter (9,842 sq. foot) Venezuela Pavilion was in the geometric shape of a Klein bottle. It was structured in the form of an "8" – a symbolic number both in China and Venezuela, with the eight stars of Simón Bolívar which had been incorporated into the Venezuelan flag in 2006. The pavilion depicted many traditional aspects of Venezuela's history and culture. There was one escalator, an auditorium, an open-air atrium with a small café offering fresh fruit juices and fried Venezuelan snacks. An equestrian sculpture of Simón Bolívar by Chinese artist Yuang Xikung was installed near the entrance to the pavilion.

=== Vietnam ===
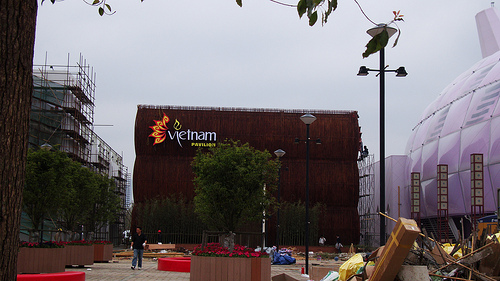
Vietnam pavilion

- Within Zone A of the Expo Site.
- Theme: 1000-Year History of Hanoi.
- The facade of the 1,000-square-meter pavilion appeared like a river and the bamboo surrounding it reduced the heat from the sun. The design highlighted Vietnamese culture. Visitors could learn about the country's profound history and culture as well as its wisdom in eco-protection and urban development.

== Corporate pavilions ==
The Shanghai World Expo had a number of corporate pavilions.

=== Information and Communication Pavilion ===
The Information and Communication Pavilion, with its theme "Information and Communication – Extending City Dreams", was a corporate pavilion co-sponsored by China Mobile and China Telecom.

The 6,196-square-meter pavilion was designed so that hexagonal panels, which cover the building's entire exterior, continuously change colors and animate in various patterns. These panels were made of recyclable material and most of the construction materials used for the pavilion were environmentally friendly and intended to be recyclable and reusable at the end of the Expo. In addition to its recyclable content, another sustainable feature of the Information and Communication Pavilion was the use of cold water from the Expo site to regulate the building's indoor temperature and reduce energy consumption and emissions.

The show aspects of the Information and Communication Pavilion were conceived and produced by designer Bob Rogers' Burbank, California based firm, BRC Imagination Arts. The firm, which was also responsible for the show aspects of the US Pavilion at the Shanghai Expo, has an extensive history in Expo show designs, producing content for six world's fairs, including the film for the Vancouver Expo, "Rainbow War", which was nominated for an Academy Award ("Oscar").

Visitors to the Information and Communication Pavilion participated in its show elements with the use of mobile devices that enable each to interact with show content and show characters.

The interaction began before pavilion visitors enter the pavilion structure. Outside, in the pavilion's outdoor queue, referred to as the "Dream Garden", visitors waiting to enter the pavilion could use mobile phones to interact with the information and video streaming all around them. Once in the pavilion, visitors were given a personal interactive device carry with them to use in both the pre-show as well as in the main show portions of the pavilion experience. The pre-show film presented visitors with highlights of key moments and the historically important figures who led to advancements in communication technologies. In the main show, visitors used their personal interactive devices to further interact with the main show characters and events and record personal choices of ideas presented to them in the show. The interaction by the audience with the storylines of the show's key characters, and immersive theater and screen special effects, helped to relay the ideal that the capabilities of communications in our future society are limitless.

=== SAIC-GM Pavilion ===
SAIC and GM jointly produced a pavilion spanning around 6,000 square meters about driving in 2030.

The pavilion featured futuristic demonstrations of highly mobile electric cars named EN-V. The New York Times notes, "The trio have separate personalities. Xiao ("laugh" in Chinese) by Holden in Australia is playful and lighthearted, a "gumball blue" cousin to Wall-E, the film character. Miao (Magic) was designed at the General Motors Advanced Design Studio in California. Its LED accents applied to a dark form suggesting a large motorcycle helmet were inspired by consumer electronics. Jiao (Pride), by G.M. Europe designers, suggests Western admiration for China with a clean and bright look inspired by bullet trains and Chinese opera masks."

== International organisations ==
International organisations were well represented at this expo, with almost 50 participants. Some had their own pavilions, and some were shared.

=== United Nations ===
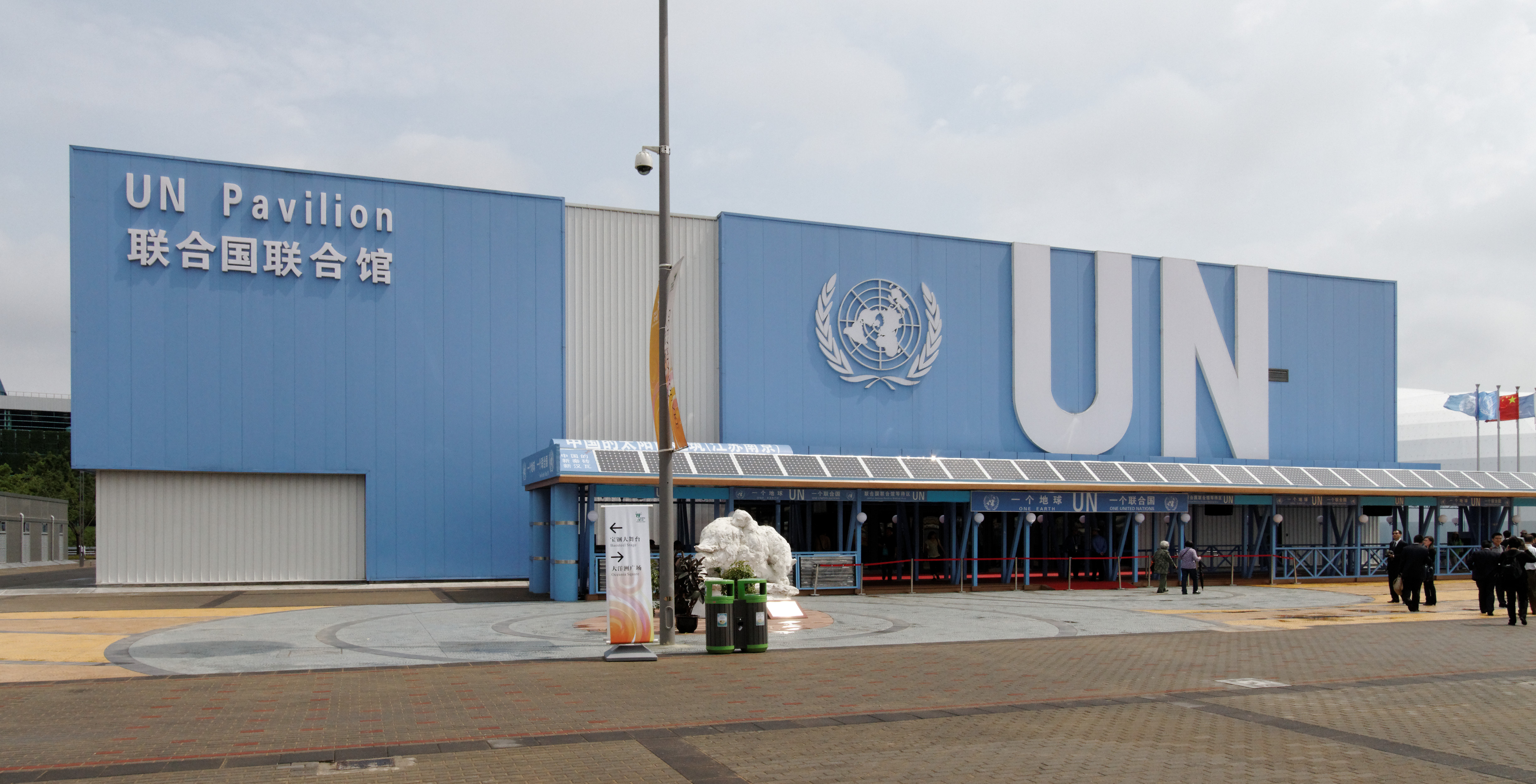
UN Pavilion

The UN had their own pavilion in Zone B, near to the Pacific pavilion.

=== Red Cross and Red Crescent ===
The International Federation of Red Cross and Red Crescent also had their pavilion in Zone B and on August 1 had welcomed over 500,000 visitors according to the official website.

=== Joint pavilion of international organizations ===
This pavilion had stands for the Association of Southeast Asian Nations (ASEAN), Boao Forum for Asia, Common Market for Eastern and Southern Africa (COMESA), Forum Francophone des Affaires, Global Environment Facility, International Association of Public Transport, International Council of Museums (which was inaugurated by its Director General, Julien Anfruns), International Network for Bamboo and Rattan (INBAR), League of Arab States (sometimes called Arab League), Shanghai Cooperation Organisation, United Cities and Local Governments, World Water Council (WWC) and the World Wildlife Fund.

== Urban Best Practice Area pavilions ==
This was an area in Zone E in which cities presented themselves, many displayed in one of four joint pavilions, some in stand-alone pavilions

=== Joint Pavilions ===
Cities contributing in the joint pavilions included:

- Barcelona (Spain) – The District of Innovation
- Bremen (Germany) – From Knowledge to Innovation: Urban Transportation Solutions
- Cairo (Egypt) – Integrated Model for Revitalization of Historical Cities
- Düsseldorf (Germany) – Business Meets Lifestyle – Livable City and Sustainable Development as Strategic Goals and Achievements
- Hong Kong (China) – Smart Card, Smart City, Smart Life, whose pavilion showed the practical use of the Hong Kong octopus card, and placed it in historical context of contactless smart cards (it was first)
- Liverpool (UK) – Protection and Utilization of Historical Heritages in Liverpool. The Liverpool display had 3 sections: an auditorium where visitors viewed a 3D show; an event and exhibition area including games and a VIP area. For most of the expo a superlambanana was on display outside the pavilion, before being presented to Shanghai, and being replaced by table football
- London (UK) – Zero Carbon Living ZedPavilion, A collaboration between UK Architect Bill Dunster and University of Nottingham. Low carbon urban design and sustainable technologies formed the basis for an exhibition, a series of 'show-houses' and a seminar series that showcased Sino-UK collaboration on everything from sustainable city healthcare to carbon capture and storage. The Pavilion itself was one of the cheapest to build on the Expo Park at GBP350k and is one of the few legacy buildings. More than 1M visitors were recorded by the ZedPavilion hosts.
- Montreal (Canada) – The Complexe Environnemental de Saint-Michel (CESM): A practicable example for the world showcased the transformation of Saint Michel from a landfill to a green area. The exhibition, designed and produced by gsmprjct°, featured an installation of mobile blocs that served as a three-dimensional projection screen on which a multimedia show of the site's transformation was projected.
- Pondicherry (India) – Achieving Economic and Environmental Goals through Heritage Preservation Initiatives as Demonstrated through: Asia Urbs Programme 2002–2004
- Porto Alegre (Brazil) – Governance Practice Based on Social Consensus: Strategies for Social Integration Promotion
- Rotterdam (Netherlands) – Rotterdam Watercity
- São Paulo (Brazil) – Clean City Project
- Venice (Italy) – Protection and Utilization of Historical Heritages: Urban Best Practices in Venice

=== Makkah ===
This pavilion from Saudi Arabia described the tent city of Mina, temporary accommodation for 3 million people each year during the Hajj pilgrimage. The pavilion described transport, accommodation and sanitation needs and solutions.

=== Madrid ===
This Spanish pavilion was entitled The Sample of Government Low-cost Housing Estate and described the work there on the largest public housing project in Europe over the last decade.

=== Odense ===
The city of Odense, the birth city of Hans Christian Andersen, had an exhibition called Spinning Wheels, showcasing the city as a bike friendly destination.

=== Vancouver ===
Vancouver's exhibit was called "Cultural Heritage and Livable City: From Expo 1986 to 2010 Winter Olympics and included pictures and plans which showed how areas had changed over the 24 years between the city's two most significant international events

== Other pavilions ==
=== Citizen's Initiative Pavilion ===
Situated in Zone B, this was the only public participation pavilion at the expo. It took the theme Each Action You Take Will Change Our Life and comprised three sections:

- "Paper" in Constant Change
- History of World Expo
- An interactive area including an activity to design an ideal city

The number of visitors reached 1 million in July

=== Life & Sunshine Pavilion ===
The first ever expo pavilion designed for disadvantaged people, this pavilion gave visitors the opportunity to experience some of the physical sensations associated with some disabilities. It hosted a wedding in October.

=== MeteoWorld Pavilion ===
The first meteorological pavilion ever at an expo, this explored efficient energy use, energy conservation, natural phenomenon (via a 3-D film), weather forecasting, disaster prevention and climate change.
