= Maciej Masłowski =

Polish art historian (1901–1976)

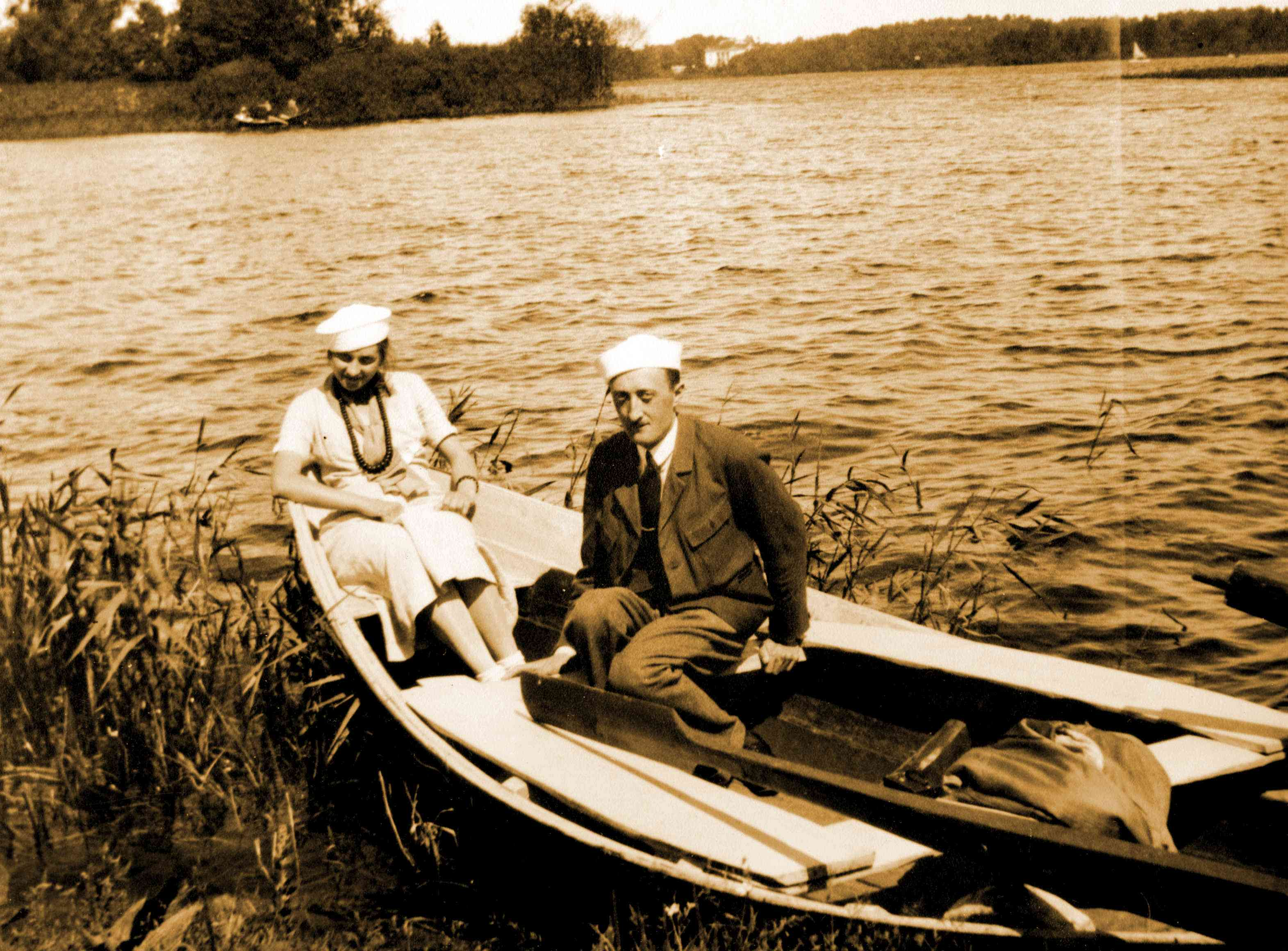
Maciej Masłowski and his wife Halina, during their visit to Girdwoyń family in Troki near Wilno, c. 1935

Maciej Masłowski (January 24, 1901 – August 17, 1976) was a Polish art historian.

== Biography ==
Masłowski was born in Warsaw. He was a son of painter Stanisław Masłowski (1853–1926) and piano teacher Aniela born Ponikowska (1864–1940). After graduating from (Mickiewicz-Konopczyński School) in Warsaw, he studied at University of Warsaw, first history, and then art history. (His teacher was Zygmunt Batowski.)

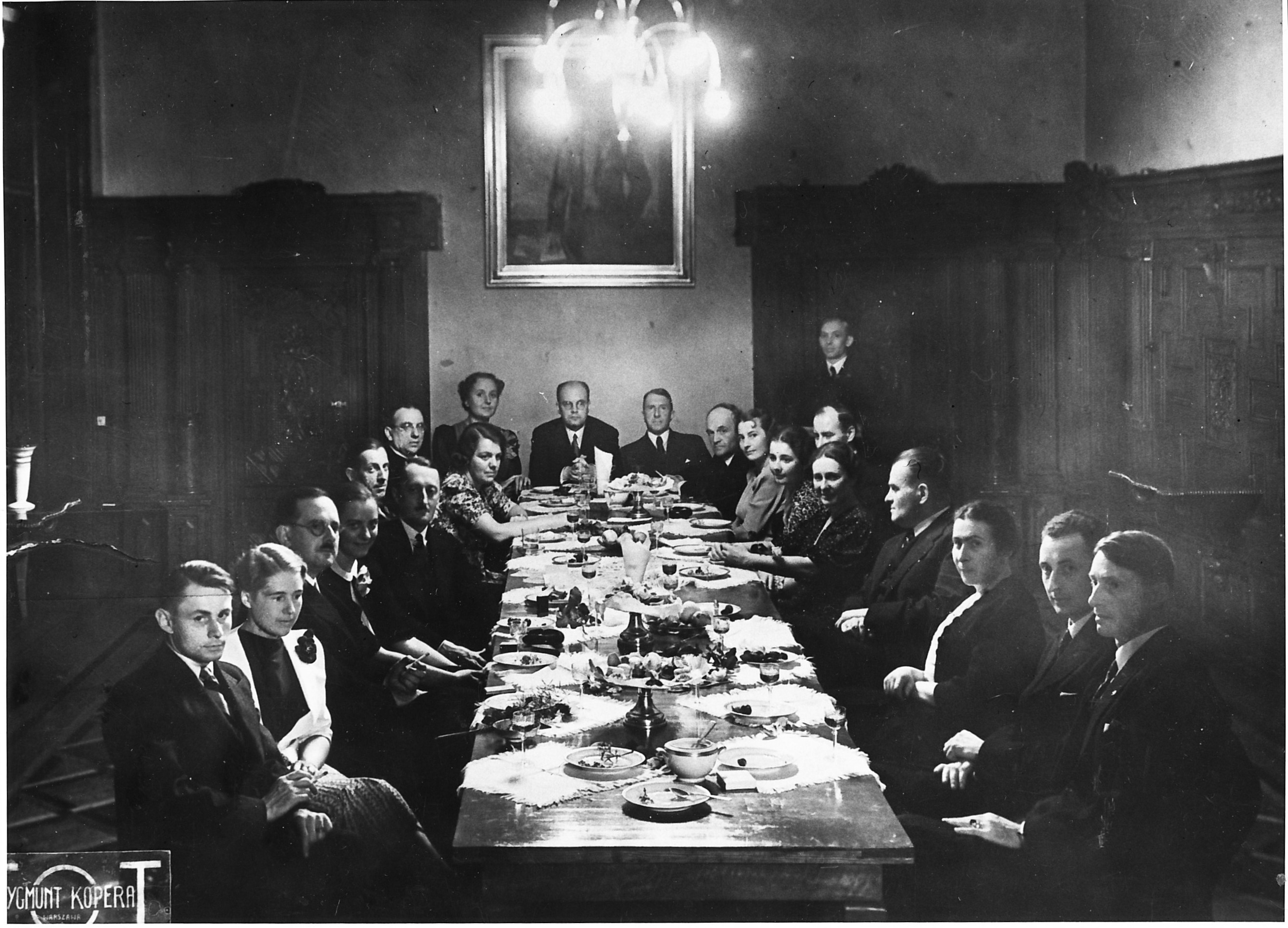
Assembly of Fine Arts Section of Ministry of Religious Denominations and Public Education, Warsaw, Poland, 1938, Maciej Masłowski 5th on the left

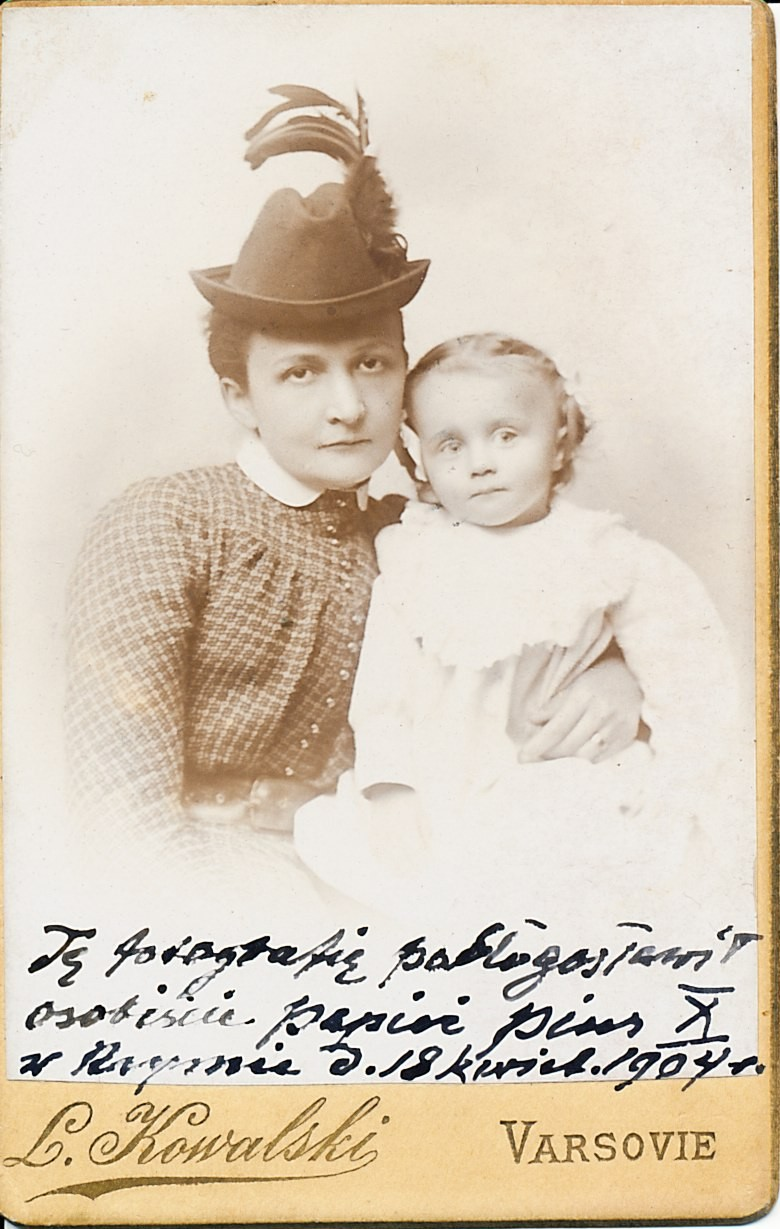
Maciej Masłowski, aged 3 and his mother, photograph of 1904

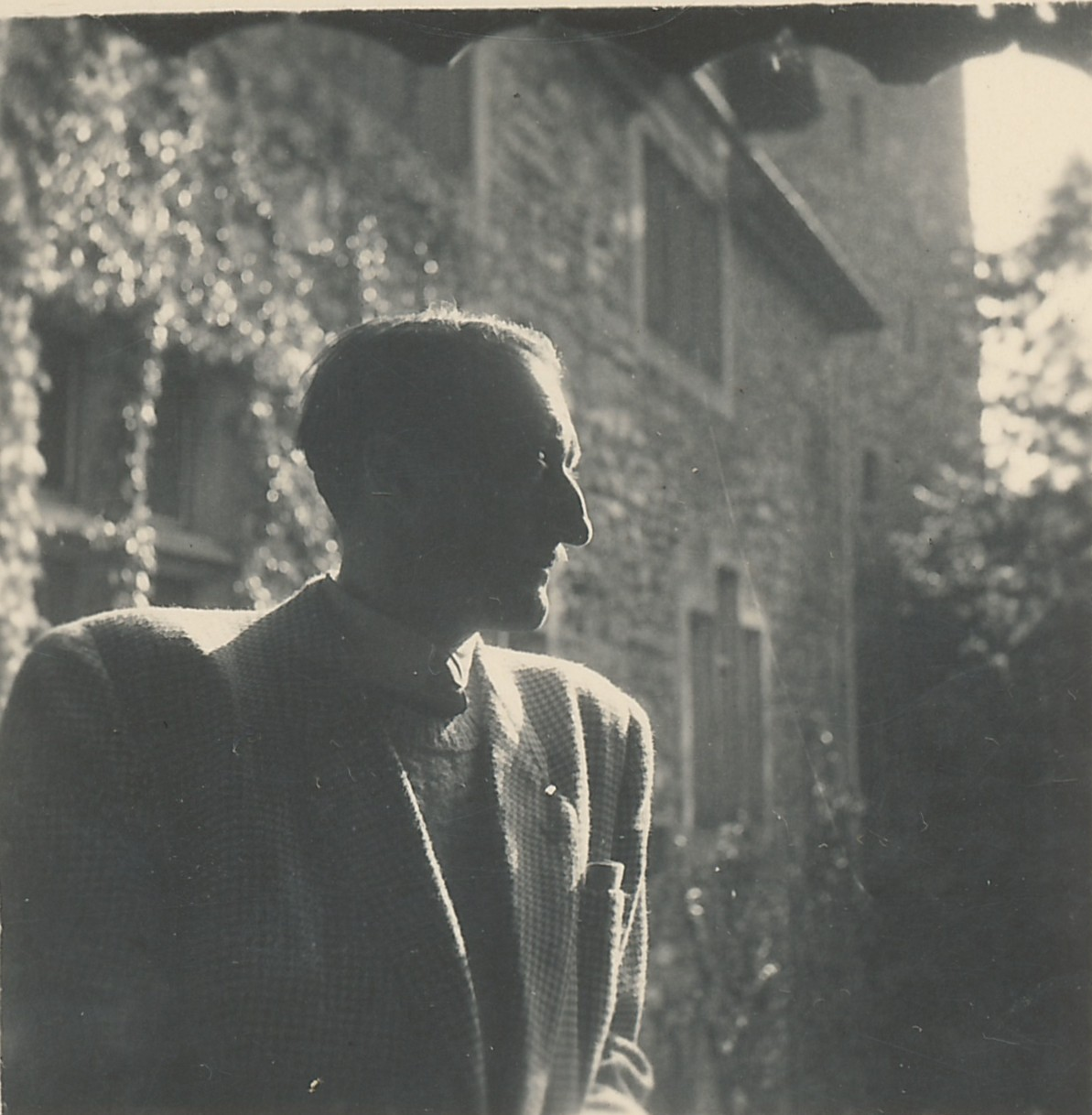
Maciej Masłowski, Schloss, Rapperswil, Polish Museum, Switzerland, July–August 1948

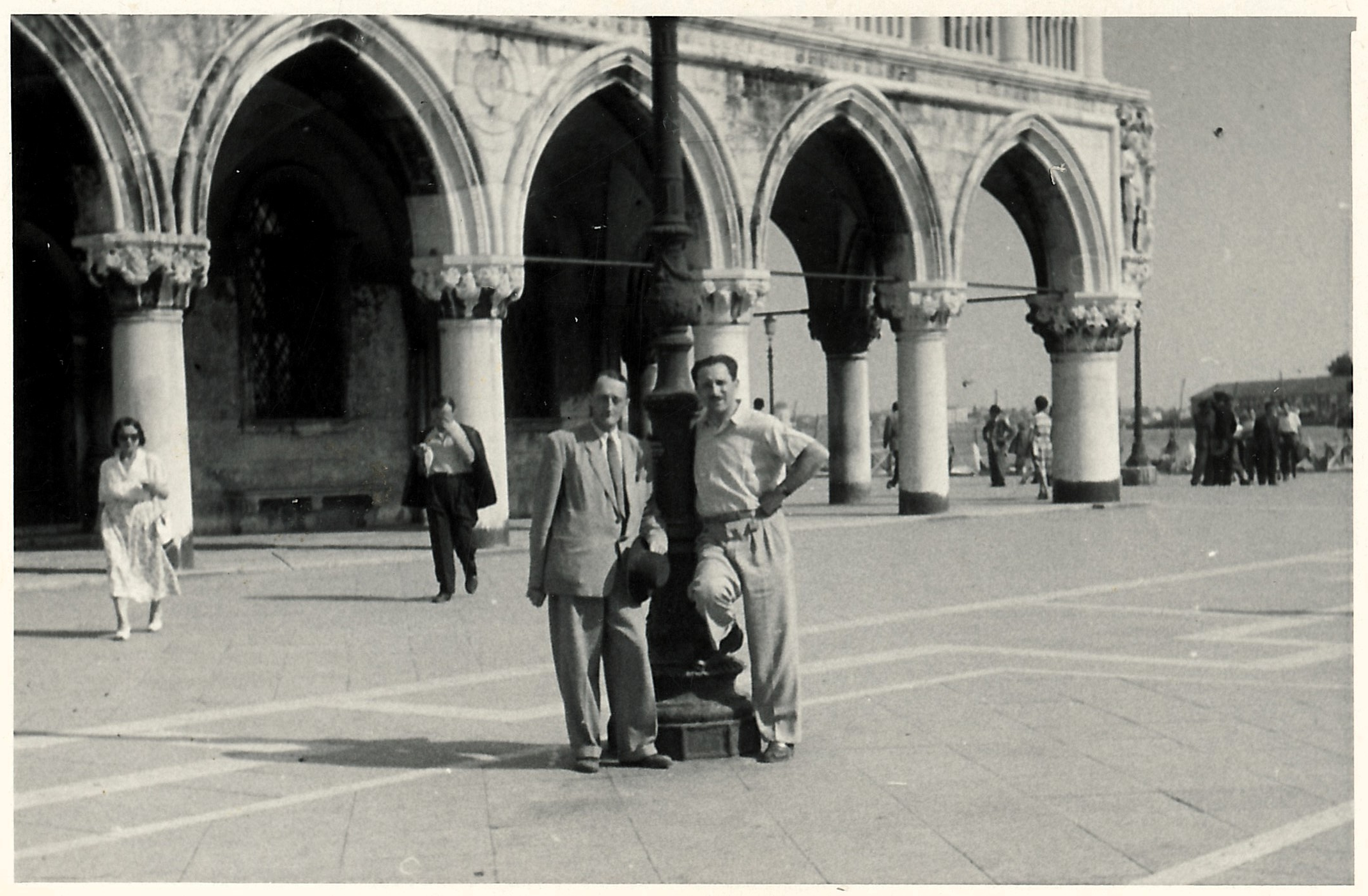
Maciej Masłowski (left) and Polish consul Stefan Płoński, Piazza di San Marco, Venice, August 1948

From 1931 to 1939 he worked in the Department of Fine Arts of the Ministry of Religious Affairs and Public Education (Polish abbr.: WRiOP) and at the same time as the manager of Mobile Art Exhibition and organizer of the Summer Institutes of Folk Arts at Żabie on Hucul region — 1938 and in Zakopane on Podhale region — 1939. Since 1937, he was a delegate of the Polish Minister of Religious Affairs and Public Education to the Interministerial Committee on Folk Industry and Folk Art.

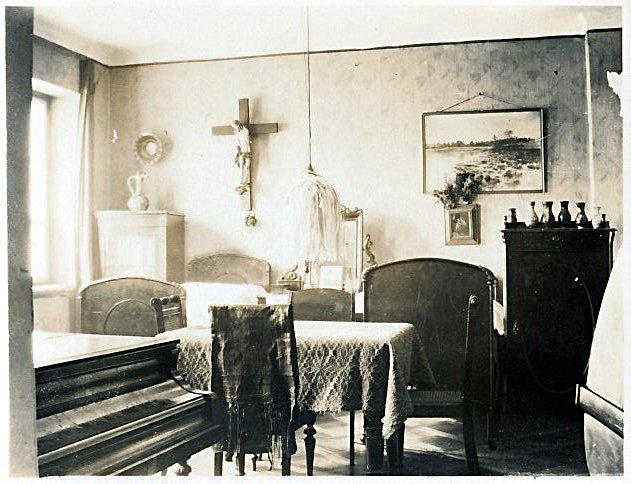
Masłowski's apartment, Warsaw, Poland, 60, Chmielna street, apt.7, fragment completely destroyed at the end of 1944

From 1939 to 1945 he was the artistic and scientific advisor to Society for the Protection of Folk Art in Warsaw. Between 1945 and 1946 he collaborated with the Polish National Institute of Fine Arts in Warsaw. In 1947-1949 he was a professor of College of Fine Arts in Warsaw, and in 1948-1949 - the chief of the Institute of the Dissemination of Fine Arts in Warsaw, later transformed into the Central Bureau of Artistic Exhibitions, and then into the Zachęta National Gallery of Art. In 1948, he has been Polish Division Commissioner for the Biennale in Venice, and then, in 1948-1949 - the manager of the Polish Museum in Rapperswil in Switzerland. In the same year he was also commissioner of Polish Painting Retrospective Exhibition in Prague in Czechoslovakia. Between 1950 and 1951 he was research professor in the National Institute of Art in Warsaw (later transformed into the Art Institute of Polish Academy of Sciences).

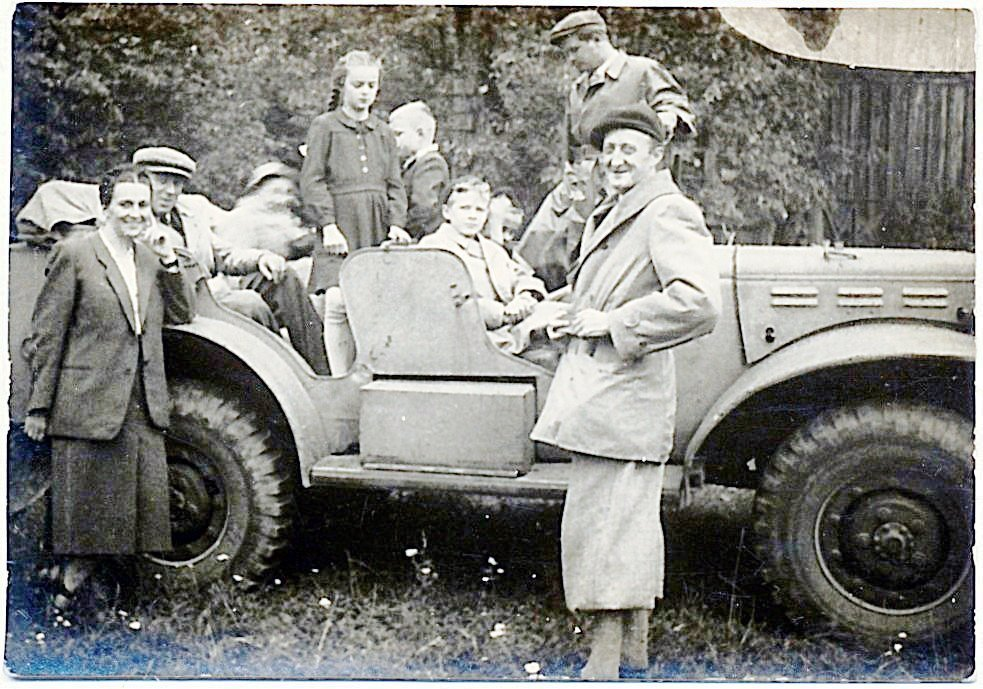
Maslowski visit to Stanisław Aust Family - Józef Chełmoński grandson, Masłowski - right with beret, Aust and his wife - left Kuklówka Zarzeczna, 1947

During the communism oppression era - from 1951 - he gave up a regular job, which has not afterwards returned. Trying to survive, he undertook various commercial activities and cultivated research and literary work at home in Podkowa Leśna (where he lived permanently from 1945 until his death in 1976 in Wysokie Mazowieckie).

From 1933 he was married to Halina Klisiński. He had two children (Christine, born 1940 married Kahl, and Andrew, born 1937). He was buried in Powązki Cemetery in Warsaw ("Stare Powązki" - Old Powązki Cemetery) in the family tomb (section 11-1-7/8).

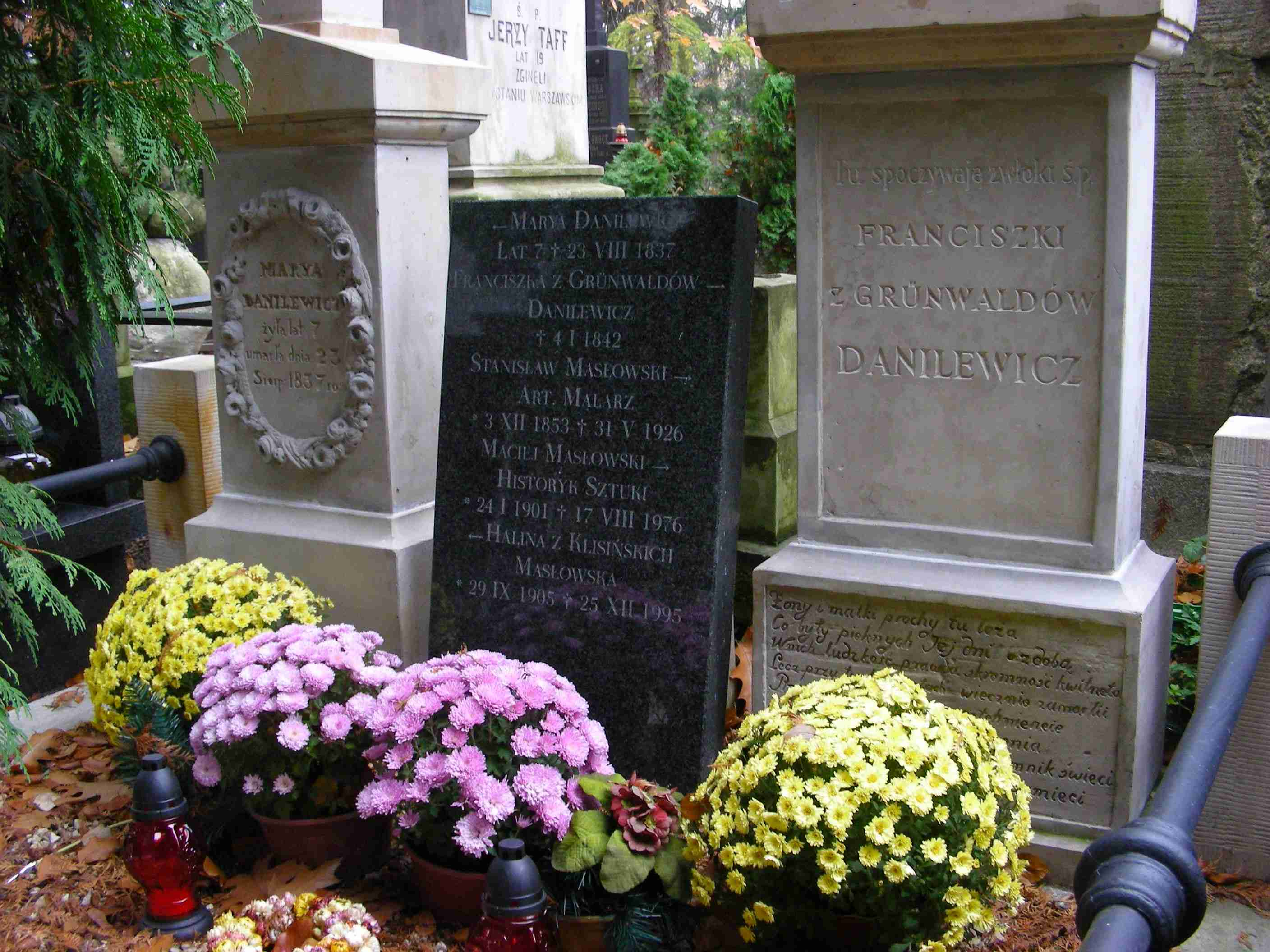
Masłowski grave at Stare Powązki Cemetery in Warsaw, Poland, sect. 11-1-7/8, view of November 2012

== Major works ==
- Henryk Grombecki - Studium monograficzne, Warsaw 1936;
- Piotr Michałowski, Warsaw 1957, ed. "Sztuka";
- Stanisław Masłowski (introduction and collection of pictures), Warsaw 1957, ed. "Sztuka";
- Stanisław Masłowski - Materiały do życiorysu i twórczości (Materials for Biography and Works), Wrocław 1958, ed. "Ossolineum" (in the series "Sources for the History of Polish Art", vol. VII);
- Marian Trzebiński - Pamiętnik Malarza (Memoirs of a Painter, a critical analysis and introduction to...), Wrocław 1958, ed. "Ossolineum";
- Zygmunt Waliszewski, Warsaw 1962, ed. "Arkady";
- Dzieje Polski w obrazach (Polish History in Pictures - introduction and selection of images to the album), Warsaw 1962, ed. "Arkady";
- Studia Malarskie Wojciecha Kornelego Stattlera w Krakowie i Rzymie (Wojciech Korneli Stattler Studies of Painting in Kraków and Rome), Wrocław 1964, ed. "Ossolineum";
- Julian Fałat, Warsaw 1964, ed."Arkady";
- Malarski żywot Józefa Chełmońskiego (Józef Chełmoński Painter's Life), Warsaw 1965, ed. "PIW" (ed. National Publishing Institute, 2nd edition - 1972), 3rd ed. - 2014 by Bellona Publishing House;
- Cyprian Godebski - Listy o sztuce – opracowanie krytyczne, wstęp i komentarze (Cyprian Godebski - Letters of Art - A Critical Analysis, Introduction and Comments), Kraków 1970, ed. Wydawnictwo Literackie (Literary Press);
- Maksymilian Gierymski i jego czasy (Maksymilian Gierymski and His Times), Warsaw 1970, ed. "PIW" (National Publishing Institute, (2nd edition - 1976);
- Józef Chełmoński, Warsaw 1973, ed. "Auriga" - Wydawnictwa Artystyczne i Filmowe (Art and Film Publishers);
- Piotr Michałowski, Warsaw 1974, ed. "Arkady" (in the series "In the Circle of Art");
- Piotr Michałowski, Berlin 1974, ed. Henschel Verlag und Gess.;
- Juliusz Kossak, Warsaw 1984, ed. "Auriga" - Wydawnictwa Artystyczne i Filmowe (Art and Film Publishers, 2nd ed. - 1986, 3rd ed. - 1990) ISBN 83-221-0294-1.
- See also: WorldCat - https://www.worldcat.org/search?q=Maciej+Maslowski&dblist=638&fq=ap%3A%22mas%3Fowski%2C+maciej%22&qt=facet_ap%3A [acc.: 2018-02-12]
- See also: National Library of Poland catalogue - https://katalogi.bn.org.pl/discovery/search?query=any,contains,Maciej%20Mas%C5%82owski&tab=LibraryCatalog&search_scope=NLOP_IZ_NZ&vid=48OMNIS_NLOP:48OMNIS_NLOP&lang=pl&offset=0 [acc.: 2019-09-05]
