= Partridges (painting) =

1891 painting by Józef Chełmoński

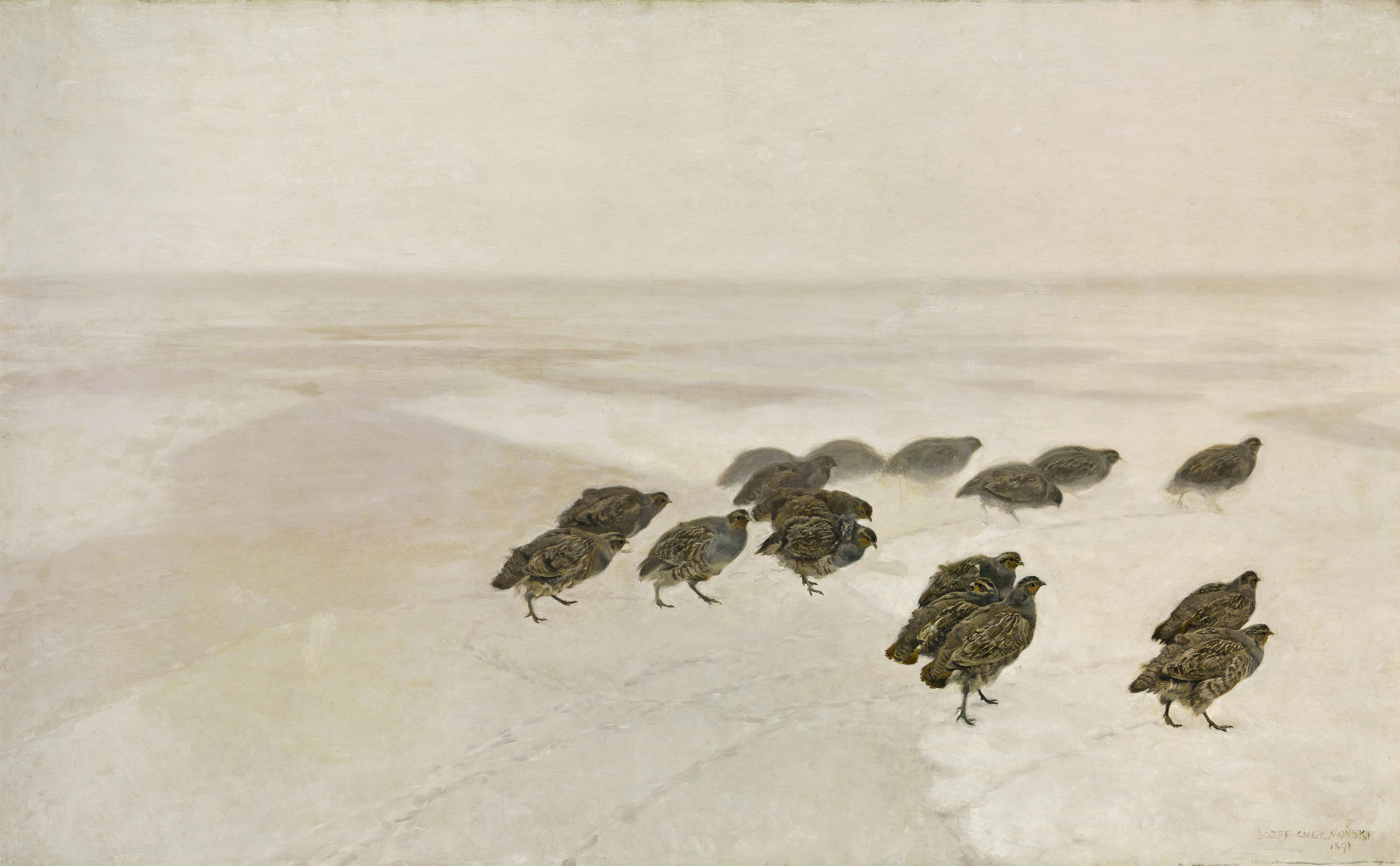
- Artist: Józef Chełmoński
- Year: 1891
- Medium: Oil on canvas
- Location: National Museum, Warsaw

Partridges (Polish: Kuropatwy) is an oil painting depicting a flock of partridges in the snow, painted in 1891 by Józef Chełmoński. The painting belongs to the collection of the National Museum in Warsaw and is one of the best-known works by the artist.

== Background and history ==
In 1887, Chełmoński returned from Paris and using the money he earned while there, bought a modest countryside estate in Kuklówka, Mazovia. The artist began a new chapter in his work around that time. His works evolved - dynamic compositions gave way to muted, more realistic landscapes. His canvases featured motifs of fields and dirt roads, forests, rivers and lakes. The artist began to paint outdoors, abandoning strong contrasting colours in favour of more subdued tones.

According to the artist's daughter, the painter often lay in the snow watching partridges. In one of the artist's sketchbooks, pencil drawings of the outlines of the birds' silhouettes are preserved. Chełmoński had made a number of sketches studying the arrangement of feathers - these may have been studies for the painting.

== Description ==
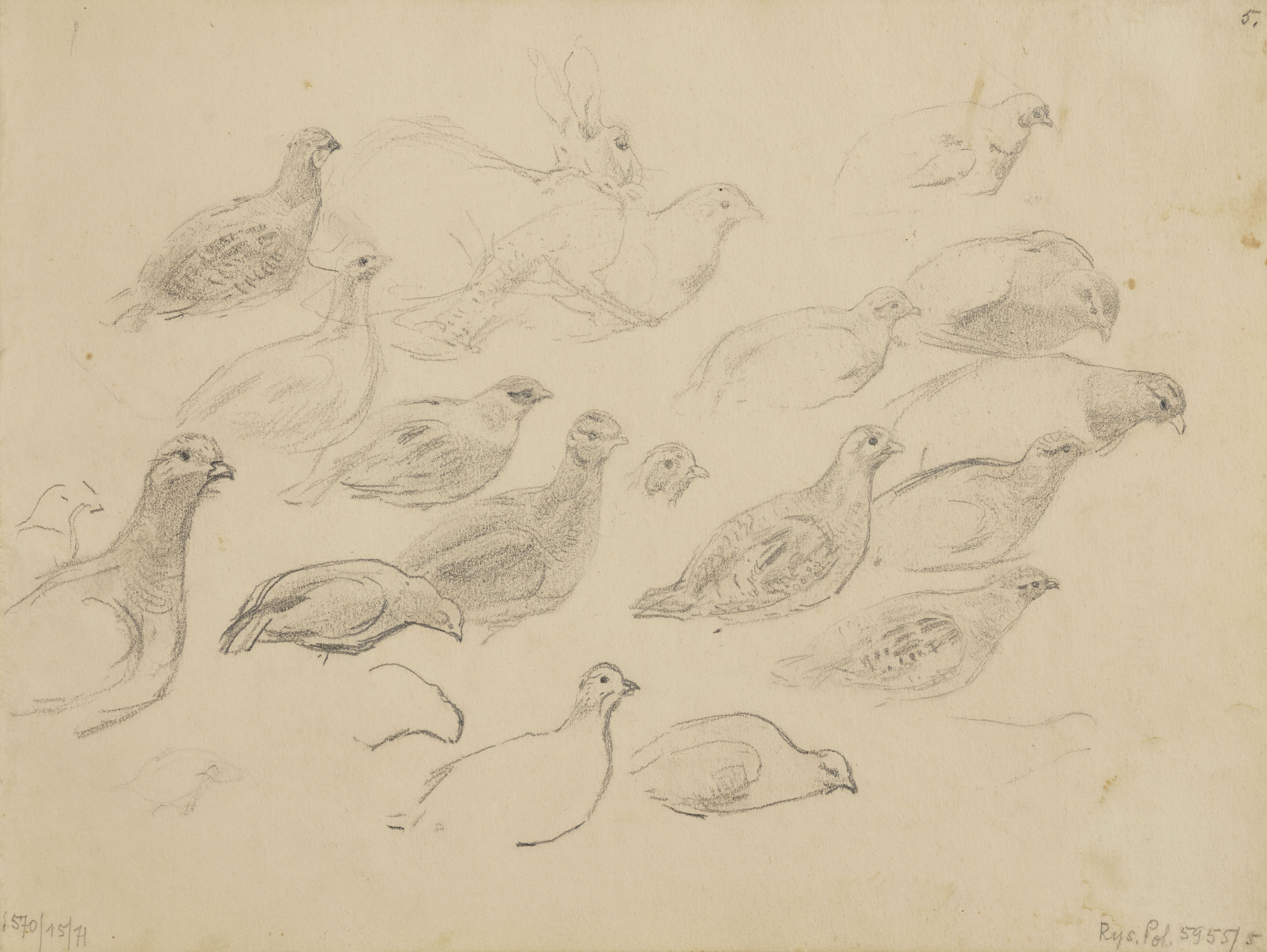
A pencil study of partridges in the artist's sketchbook. Collection of the National Museum in Warsaw

The painting shows a flock of partridges in the snow, each bird treated individually. The cold wind blows their feathers, and the sky almost merges with the earth. The composition is based on the contrast of a large surface, presented in various shades of white, with small, dark silhouettes of birds in dirty ash-gray tones. The color range is subdued, approaching monochromatic. The dark outlines of the birds' bodies are balanced by a delicately marked horizon line and the more intense color of the snow in the lower left part of the painting.

The theme is fairly typical of Chełmoński's work, since over the years, the artist has made motifs taken from the Polish countryside his trademark. The realistic depiction is somewhat balanced by the aesthetic influence of Japanese art, and of Young Poland trends. Partridges differed from Chełmoński's other bird landscapes in terms of its asymmetrical composition, white background and a synthetic depiction. Some critics suggest that this depiction represents a certain communion with nature, or a pantheistic point of view. The painter probably encountered Japanese art during his stay in Paris. Such inspirations are also visible in his painting Czajki, and according to critics, both paintings are the earliest Polish works created under the influence of Japanese art.

The painting was well received by critics and received enthusiastic reviews from Zenon Przesmycki and Feliks Jasieński. Chełmoński received an award for the painting at the International Exhibition in Berlin in 1891.
