= Storks (painting) =

1900 painting by Józef Chełmoński

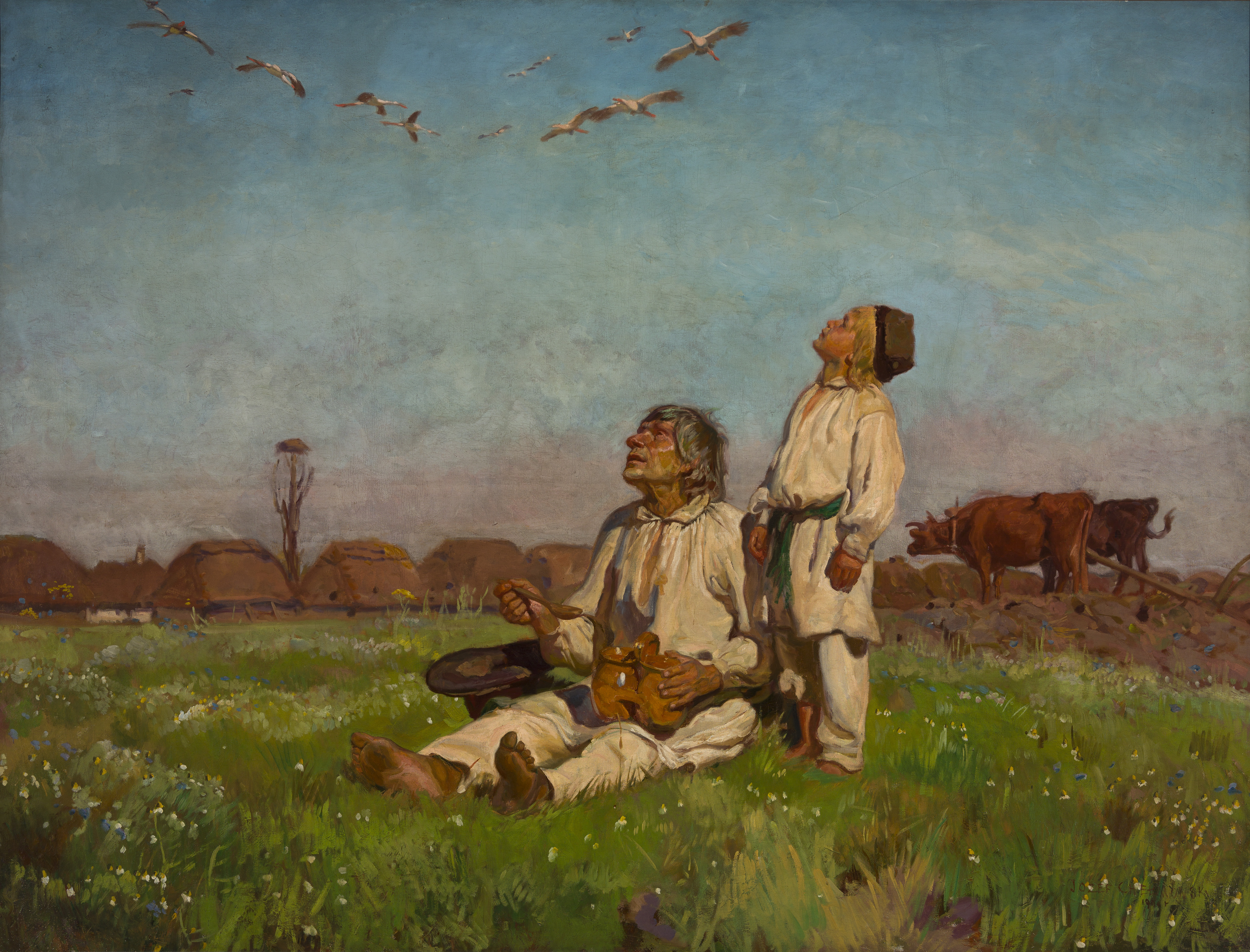
- Artist: Józef Chełmoński
- Year: 1900
- Medium: Oil on canvas
- Dimensions: 150 cm × 198 cm (59 in × 78 in)
- Location: National Museum, Warsaw

Storks (Polish: Bociany) is an oil painting by the Polish painter Józef Chełmoński, completed in 1900. It is currently in the collection of the National Museum in Warsaw.

== Description ==
The painting was created when Chełmoński returned to his homeland from abroad and settled in the Mazovian village of Kuklówka Zarzeczna, where he began painting rural themes, mainly landscapes - fields, wild birds, and workers in the fields. Storks was painted in 1900 and then exhibited a year later at the Zachęta Gallery in Warsaw. Critics praised the painting for capturing the uniquely Polish character of nature, human types, and for the painting's mood.

A ploughman and his son are watching storks in the sky. They are sitting in the middle of a green, flowery meadow, resting and eating during a break. On the horizon, one can see a row of brown thatched cottages, along with a poplar and a stork's nest. Two oxen stand on a ploughed fragment of the field.

Chełmoński demonstrated a keen ability to depict the intrinsic, almost organic connection between rural inhabitants and the natural world. In traditional folk belief, the stork was regarded as a symbol of good fortune. Its arrival in early spring was seen as an auspicious sign, foretelling a bountiful harvest, material prosperity, and robust health in the months to come. In the painting, a farmer and a boy gaze skyward with solemn reverence, placing their trust in the enduring and harmonious rhythms of the natural order. On the man's face lingers a faint expression of longing—perhaps a quiet yearning for the unrestrained freedom embodied by the birds in flight.

Chełmoński presents rural life from a fairly unspectacular, everyday perspective. Some critics believe the painting combines realism with 19th-century symbolism, as the image seems to underline the all-encompassing connection of people with nature.
