= An Idyll =

Painting by Józef Chełmoński, 1885

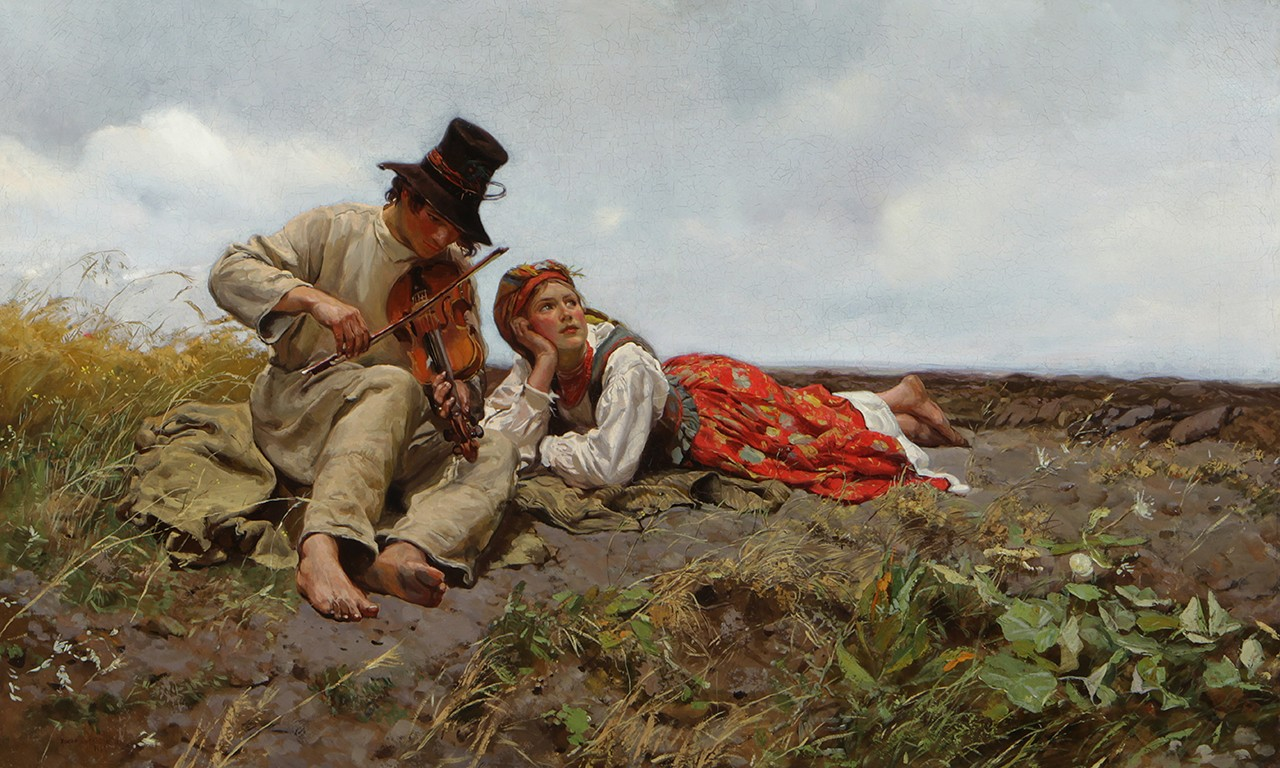
- Artist: Józef Chełmoński
- Year: 1885
- Medium: Oil on canvas
- Dimensions: 71 cm × 115 cm (28 in × 45 in)
- Location: Bowers Museum; Santa Ana

An Idyll, or An Idyll. Before the Storm (Polish: Sielanka. Przed burzą) is an oil painting by Józef Chełmoński, painted in 1885.

== History ==
Chełmoński created the painting in 1885. In a letter to Marcin Olszyński dated October 7th, 1885, the artist mentioned that a reproduction of the work was to appear in the publication "Kłosy", and that he thought of naming it A Fiddler with a Girl (Grajek z dziewczyną).

=== Ownership by Helena Modjeska ===
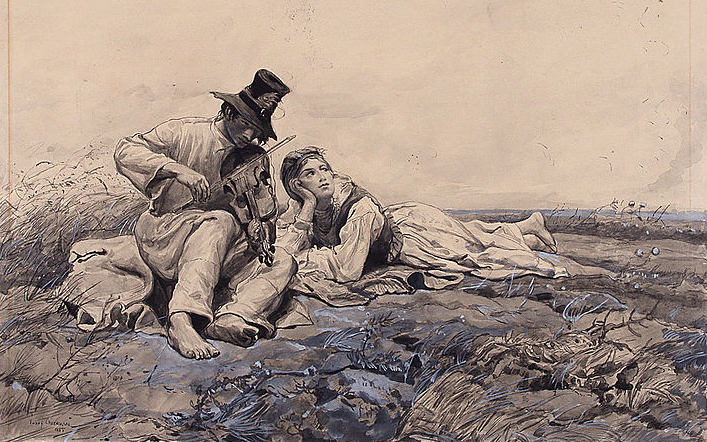
A sketch by Chełmoński based on the painting, published in the Wędrowiec illustrated weekly in 1886. Collection of the National Museum in Warsaw

Józef Chełmoński knew the Polish actress Helena Modjeska (Helena Modrzejewska), who reportedly had supported the artist and helped him get an education. The painting may have been gifted to Modjeska by the artist. According to other sources, Modjeska purchased the artwork, and already had it in her possession in 1885. The painting was displayed at the Modjeska House - Arden until her death and was considered the most valuable canvas in her collection.

The painting was then donated to the Bowers Museum in Santa Ana, California. The painting is currently in the museum's collection. It was displayed in Poland in 2009 at the exhibition devoted to Helena Modjeska, entitled Helena Modrzejewska (1840–1909). For the Love of Art at the Historical Museum of Kraków on the occasion of the 100th anniversary of Modejska's death.

Based on the painting, the artist made a drawing titled Before the Storm, which was reprinted in the illustrated magazine "Wędrowiec" in 1886; the drawing is in the collection of the National Museum in Warsaw.

=== Attribution error ===
An attribution error occurred in the 20th century, when for a period of time, the painting had been mistakenly attributed to the painter of a similar name, Jan Chełmiński (despite a clear signature in the painting’s lower left corner, and the museum donation documents both correctly pointing out to “J. Chelmonski” as the creator. This mistake likely occurred due to the similarity of names; both painters trained with Józef Brandt in Munich and both exhibited their works in Paris; howerver, Chełmiński was primarily a painter of battle scenes and other historical paintings. As a result of the error, the painting was mistakenly attributed to him, and not Chełmoński, in a few mid-20th century publications. This error has since been resolved and the image correctly attributed to Józef Chełmoński.

== Description ==
Two young people are resting outdoors, surrounded by nature. Chełmoński aimed to document reality, the phenomena and events he observed. He created depictions of everyday life - genre scenes portraying rural communities, often using subtle humour. He was particularly drawn to scenes of social interaction and preferred to adopt the perspective of the peasant homestead rather than that of the manor house.

=== Depiction of women and common people ===
The young man plays the fiddle, and the young woman listens – lost in thought, longingly staring into space. The viewer may therefore infer that dreaming and reflection are pursuits not reserved merely for upper-class ladies. Representatives of the common people also have their desires and can be nostalgic, reflective or sentimental. The choice of a young man who plays music and a girl with dirty feet, immersed in thought, resting on gray, clay soil, was difficult to accept for many artistic salon regulars contemporary to Chełmoński. This very social observation is what draws the interest and appreciation of 21st-century critics.
