= Boczki Chełmońskie =

- Village
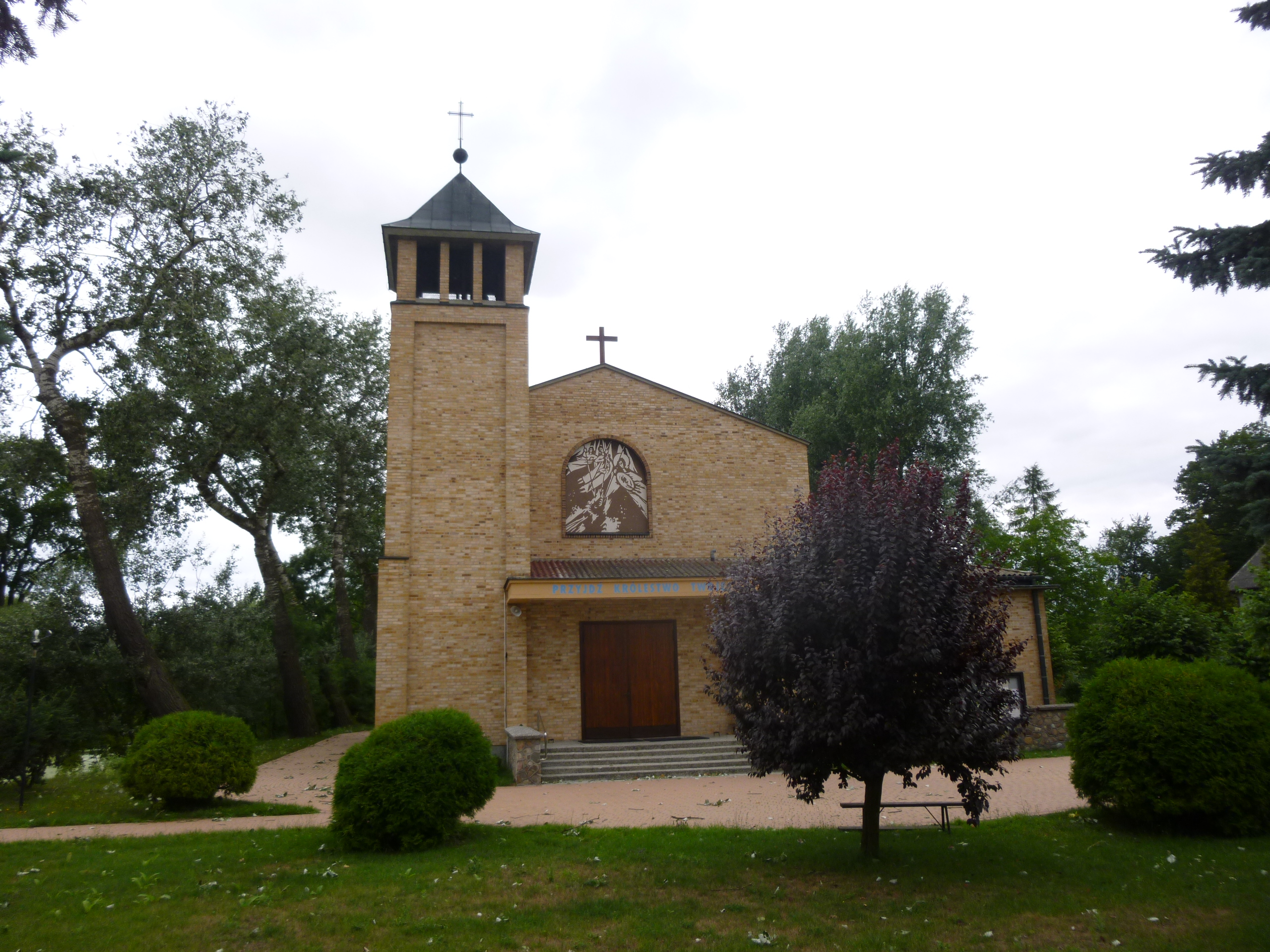
- Church of Saint Rochus

- Location within Poland
- Coordinates: 52°10′N 20°1′E
- Country: Poland
- Voivodeship: Łódź
- County: Łowicz
- Gmina: Kocierzew Południowy

Population
  - Total: 347
- Website: wiesboczki.w.interia.pl

Boczki Chełmońskie [ˈbɔt͡ʂki xɛwmɔɲskiɛ] is a village in the administrative district of Gmina Kocierzew Południowy, within Łowicz County, Łódź Voivodeship, in central Poland.

== Notable people ==
- Józef Chełmoński, Polish painter
