= Józef Chełmoński =

Polish painter (1849–1914)

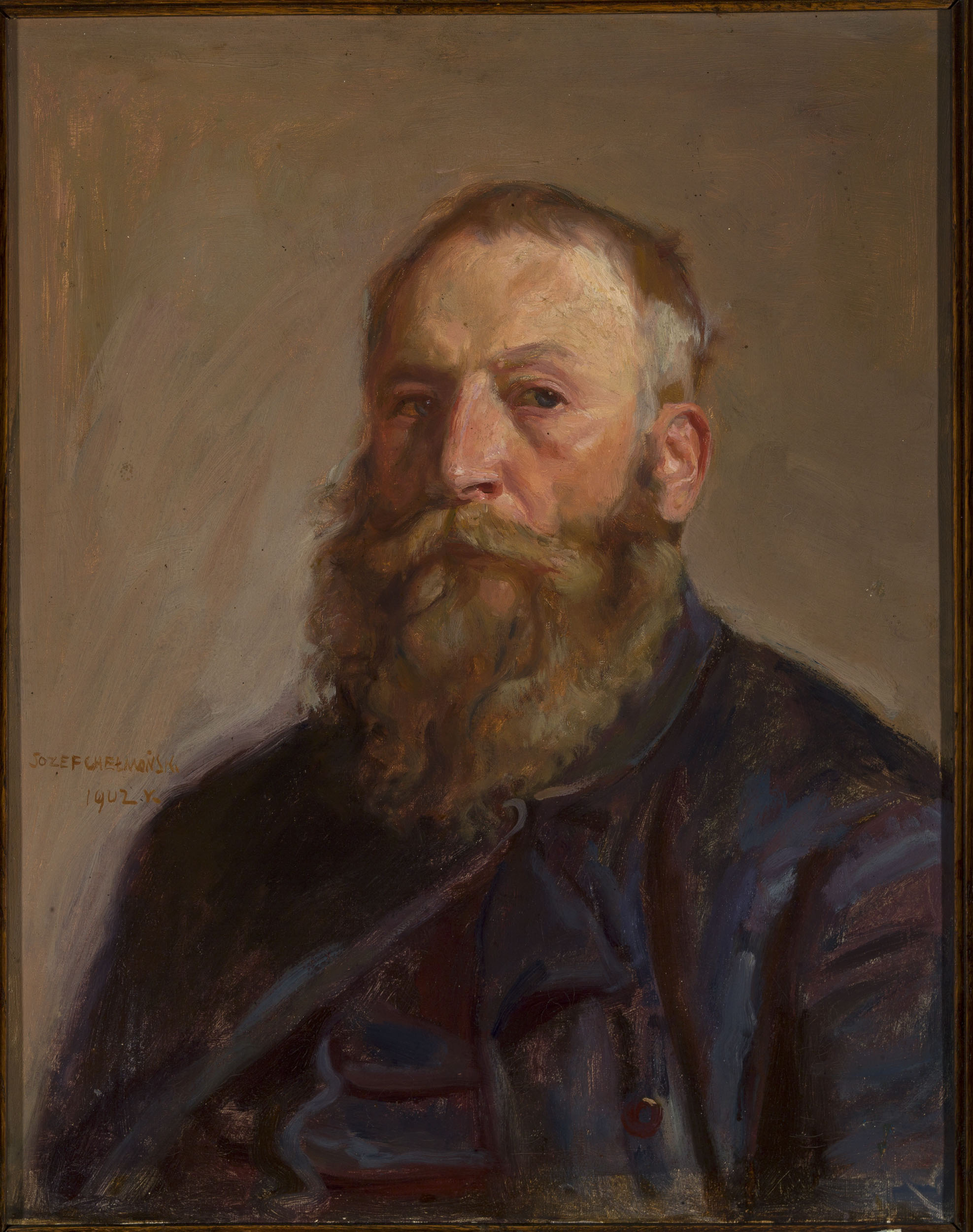
- Self-portrait, Józef Chełmoński
- Born: Józef Marian Chełmoński; 7 November 1849; Boczki, Congress Poland
- Died: 6 April 1914 (aged 64); Kuklówka, Grodzisk Mazowiecki, Poland
- Known for: Painting, drawing
- Movement: Polish patriotic painting, Realism

Józef Marian Chełmoński (7 November 1849 – 6 April 1914) was a Polish painter, known for his realistic paintings of landscapes, rural scenes and genre scenes presenting historical and social contexts of the late Romantic period in partitioned Poland. He is renowned for monumental paintings, which are now in the collections of the National Museum in Warsaw. National Museum in Kraków, the Sukiennice National Art Gallery in Kraków and other museums in Poland and abroad.

== Life ==
Chełmoński was born in the village of Boczki near Łowicz in central Congress Poland under the Russian military control. His first drawing teacher was his father Józef Adam (a small leaseholder and administrator of Boczki village). His mother was Izabela née Łoskowska.

After finishing high school in Warsaw, Józef studied in Warsaw Drawing Class (1867–1871) and took private lessons from Wojciech Gerson. In the years 1872–1875 he studied in Munich. He worked with Polish painters assembled around Jozef Brandt and Maksymilian Gierymski. There, he also studied for a few months at the academy of H. Anschutz and A. Strahuber. In 1872 and 1874 Chełmoński visited the Polish Territories (Poland was under partitions at the time), Tatra Mountains and Ukraine. After the artist returned from Ukraine, in the autumn of 1874 he rented a studio in Warsaw, which he shared with Stanisław Witkiewicz.

In 1875, thanks to the help of Cyprian Godebski and encouragement of Helena Modjeska, he went to Paris, where his work gained popularity thanks to the themes of his paintings, which were exotic to the local audiences. The artist lived in Paris until 1897, leaving only briefly for Italy and several times for Poland. After returning to Poland he settled in the village of Kuklówka in Mazovia, where he bought a manor house, later known as the Józef Chełmoński Manor House. There, he created in increasing isolation from active life and contemporary artistic trends. He died in Kuklówka on 6 April 1914.

== Work ==
Chełmoński created around 400 paintings, of which around 100 were sold to the United States, and at least 108 were missing as of 2014. Polish art historians classify Chełmoński as belonging to the "Munich-Warsaw group of the late positivism". The artist's life journey was reflected by changes in his creative work, and consequently, his artistic development tends to be divided by historians into three phases: the Warsaw-Munich phase (1867–1875), the Paris phase (1875–1887) and the period spent in Mazovia (until 1914).

=== The Warsaw and Munich period ===
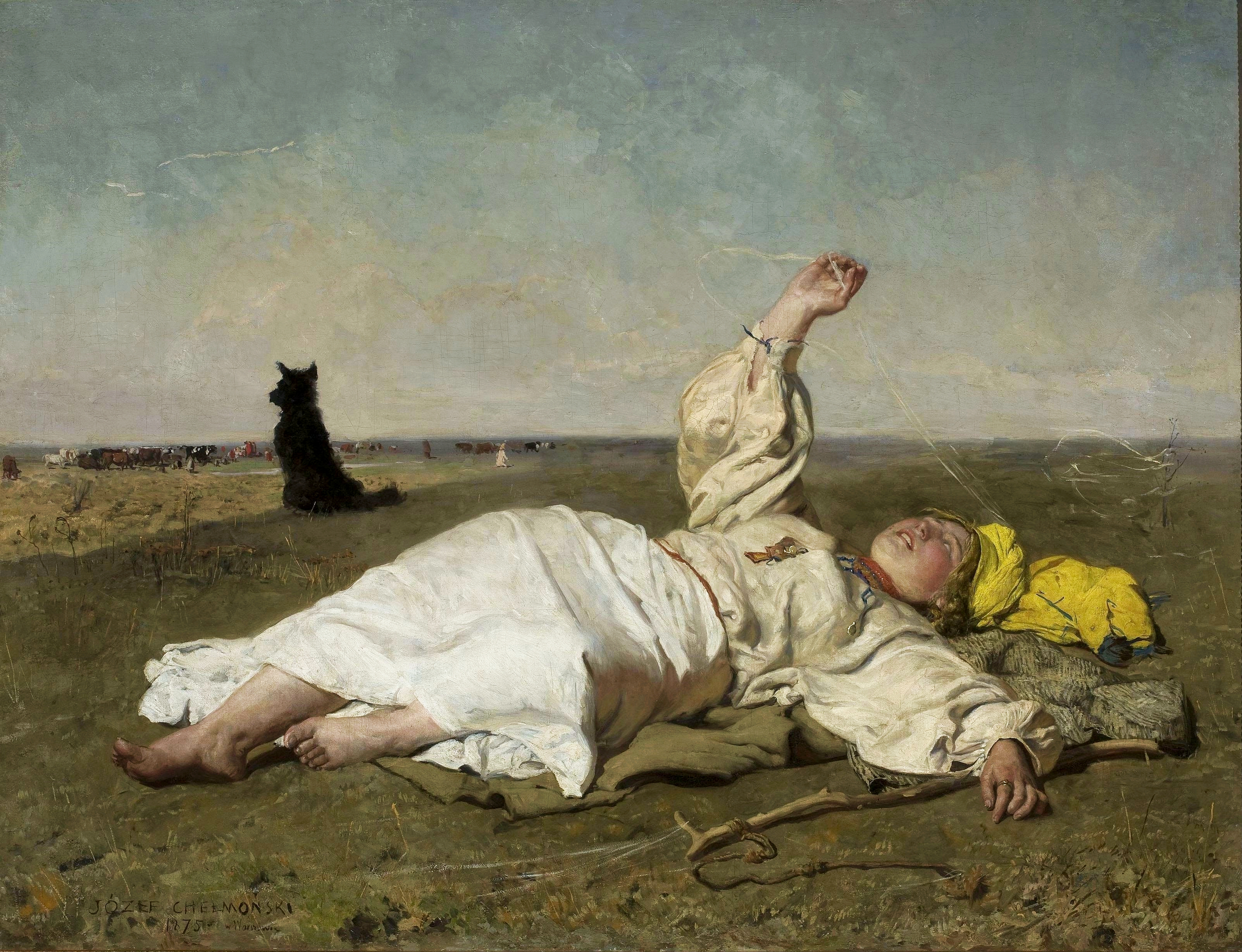
Józef Chełmoński, Indian summer, 1875

Chełmoński's first paintings were influenced by the work of Wojciech Gerson. In the initial period of his work - before leaving for Munich - the artist painted rural genre scenes, both multi-figure and intimate, often depicting horses and landscapes. The painter would return to all these motifs of his work throughout his life. Although considered a realist painter, Chełmoński was largely guided by literary inspirations of Polish Romanticism, especially the works of Adam Mickiewicz.

Munich, where the artist travelled to further study painting, was an important cultural centre, with a vibrant museum and gallery scene including the Glyptothek, the New Pinakothek, and above all the Royal Academy of Fine Arts, as well as exhibition pavilions, private galleries, and the Munich Kunstverein. This attracted many young artists, including many Polish painters such as Józef Brandt, Maksymilian Gierymski, Aleksander Gierymski, Adam Chmielowski and Stanisław Witkiewicz.

Equally important for the early period and the later years of Chełmoński's work was his experience of visiting Ukraine. Similarly to other Polish artists of the era, such as Leon Wyczółkowski and Jan Stanisławski, Chełmoński visited Ukraine and Podolia many times; he had close relatives and friends in the countryside there. In his paintings, the artist limited himself to Polish themes, and his longing for his homeland colored them with an emotional note. This was characteristic of most Polish artists in Munich, but was particularly evident in Chełmoński's works. He drew on this subject matter from his memories, which he enriched with sketches from his vacations in the country.

=== The Paris period ===
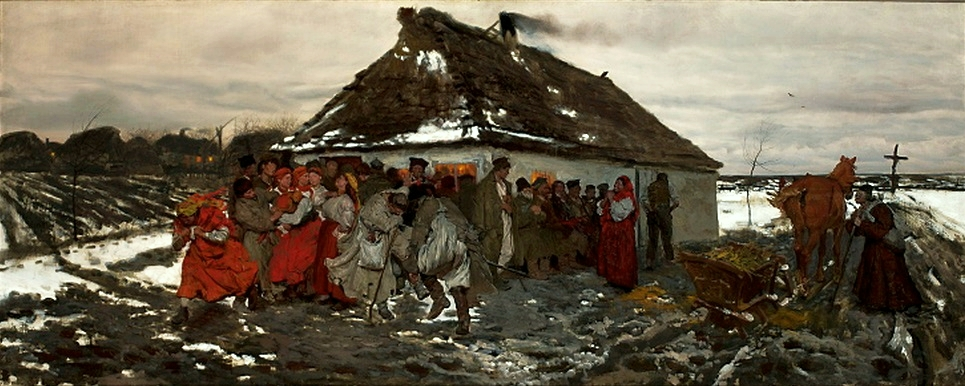
In front of the Inn, 1877, displayed at the Paris Salon of 1882

In 1875 Chełmoński went to Paris, where he had many important exhibitions and became a known figure on the art scene. During this period he used compositions that were dynamic and laden with emotions. His works depicted horse-drawn carriages, racing towards the viewer, fairs and scenes in front of rural buildings.

These works were appreciated by European and American collectors. The rural Polish life seemed exotic to French and American collectors, which contributed to Chełmoński's popularity. Chełmoński signed a contract with leading art dealer Adolphe Goupil, who sold many of his works to collectors from France and the United States. In the first half of his stay in France, when he exhibited at the annual Salons, Chełmoński was at the peak of his popularity, which also translated into initial financial success. In the later years the interest in his works diminished, which contributed to the artist's decision to return to Poland.

=== The Mazovian period ===
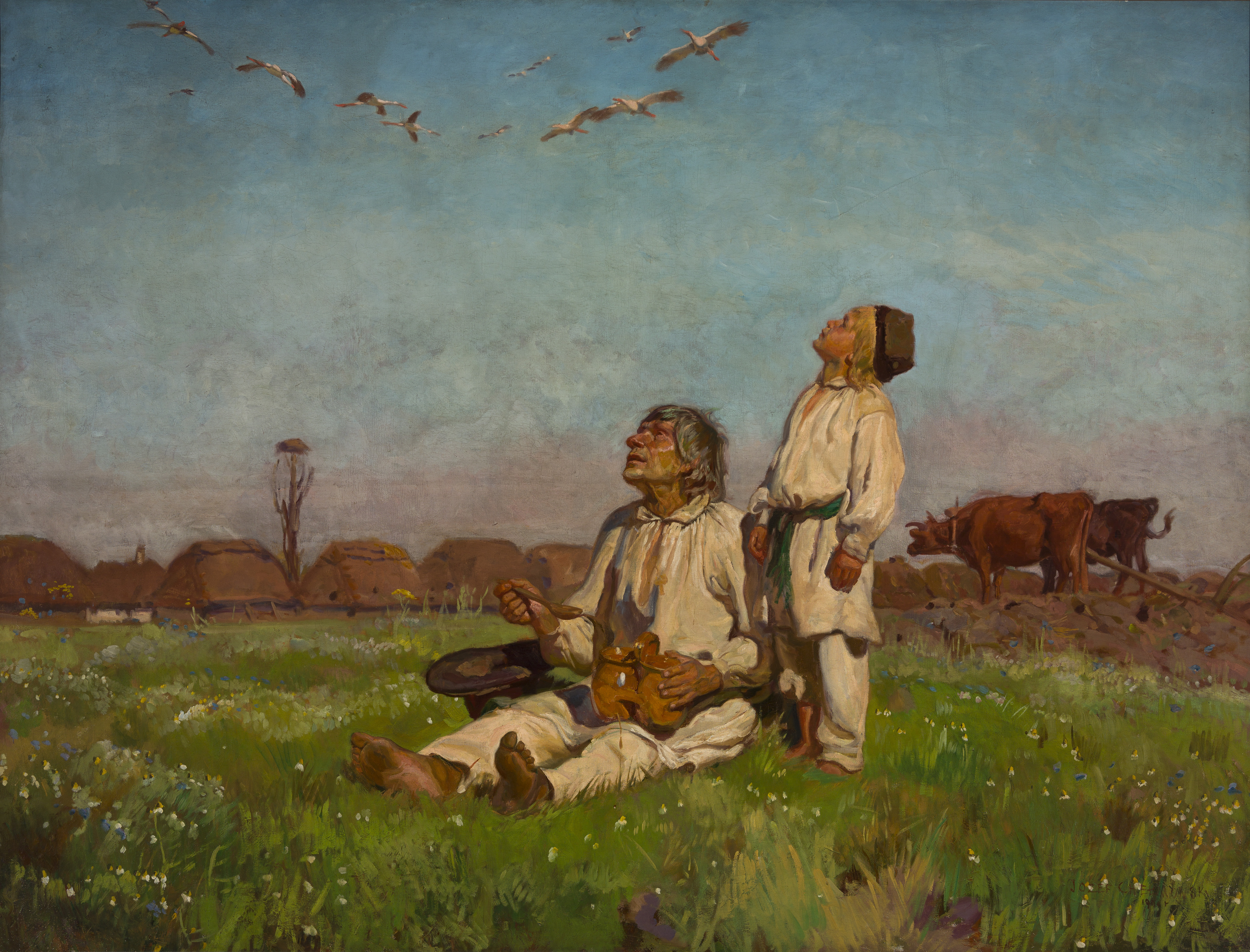
Storks, 1900

In 1887 the artist returned to Poland and in 1889 settled in the village of Kuklówka Zarzeczna. Contact with his homeland and nature are qualities revealed in his artworks of this period. Many of the best-known works by the painter were created during this time, including Partridges, Storks, and An Idyll: Before the Storm. The renewed contact with native nature after Chełmoński's return to Poland influenced the revival of his painterly vision. This period includes modest, lyrical landscapes - visual poems about nature.

== Critical acclaim ==
19th century critics, including many Polish contemporaries of the artist, had a critical view of his work. Polish critics accused the artist of neglecting the canons of beauty, of creating too quickly and thoughtlessly, and of sticking to the same themes. This critical approach to his work shifted after the artist's return from Paris, partially due to his success abroad, and partially due to the high artistic merits of his works created in the Mazovian countryside during the artist's years of living in Kuklówka.

Many 20th and 21st century critics regard Józef Chełmoński as one of the leading patriotic painters depicting the beauty of Polish lands. In the history of Polish art, Józef Chełmoński is one of the most highly regarded painters. His visions of nature, views of the countryside and rural scenes have often been described as the essence of Polishness in 19th and early 20th century painting.

== Selected works ==
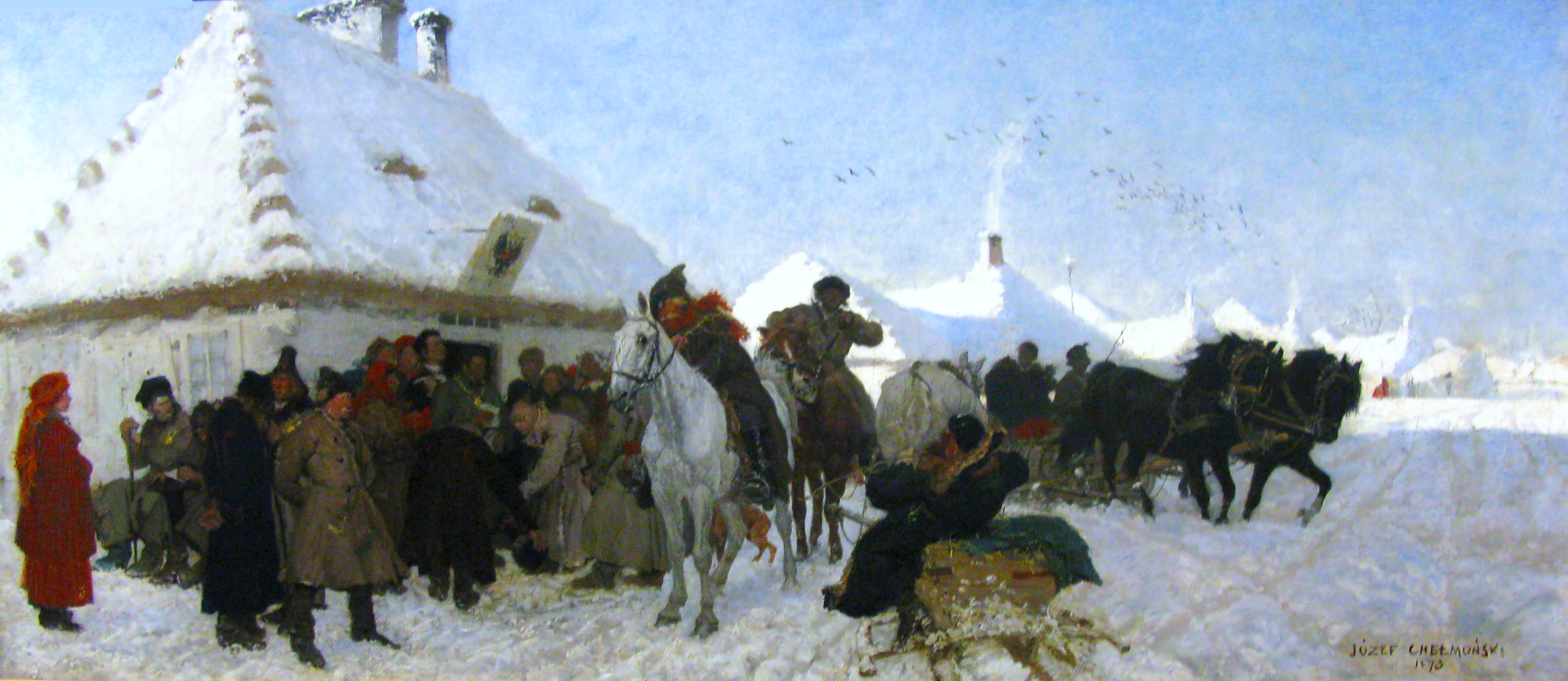
Trial Before the Village Mayor, 1873

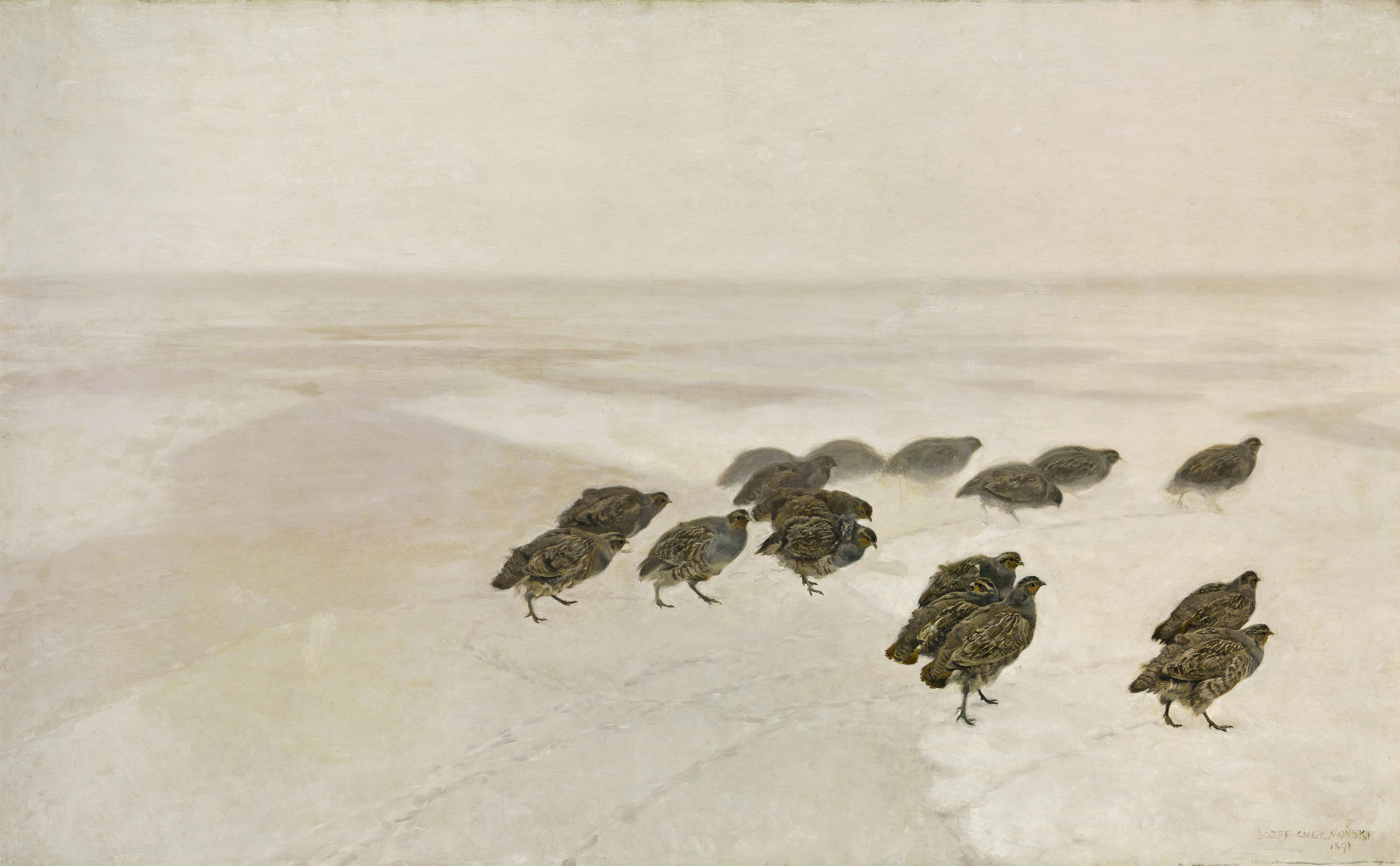
Partridges, 1891, National Museum in Warsaw

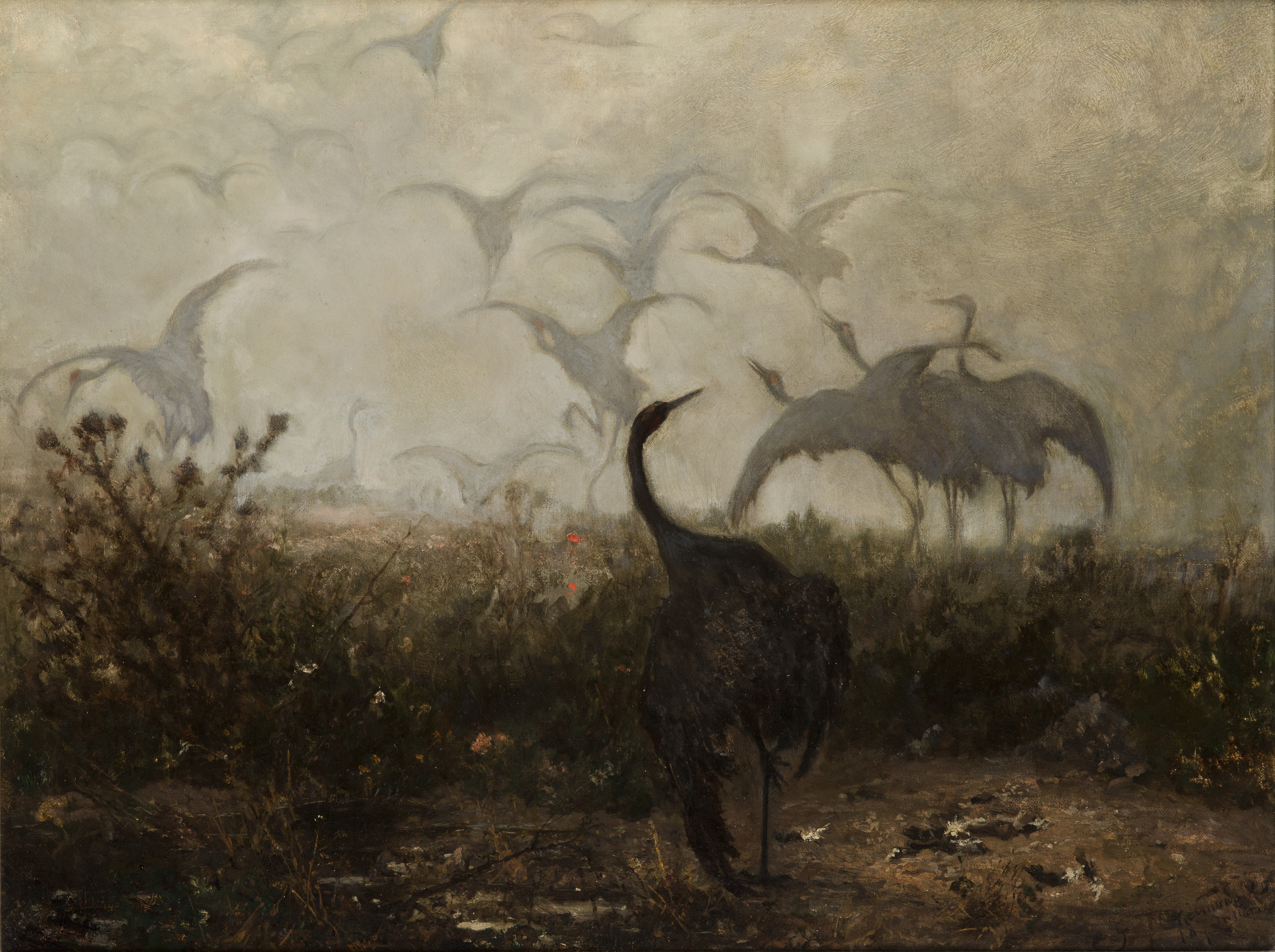
Cranes, 1870, National Museum in Kraków

Russian Horse Fair, 1878, Legion of Honor, San Francisco

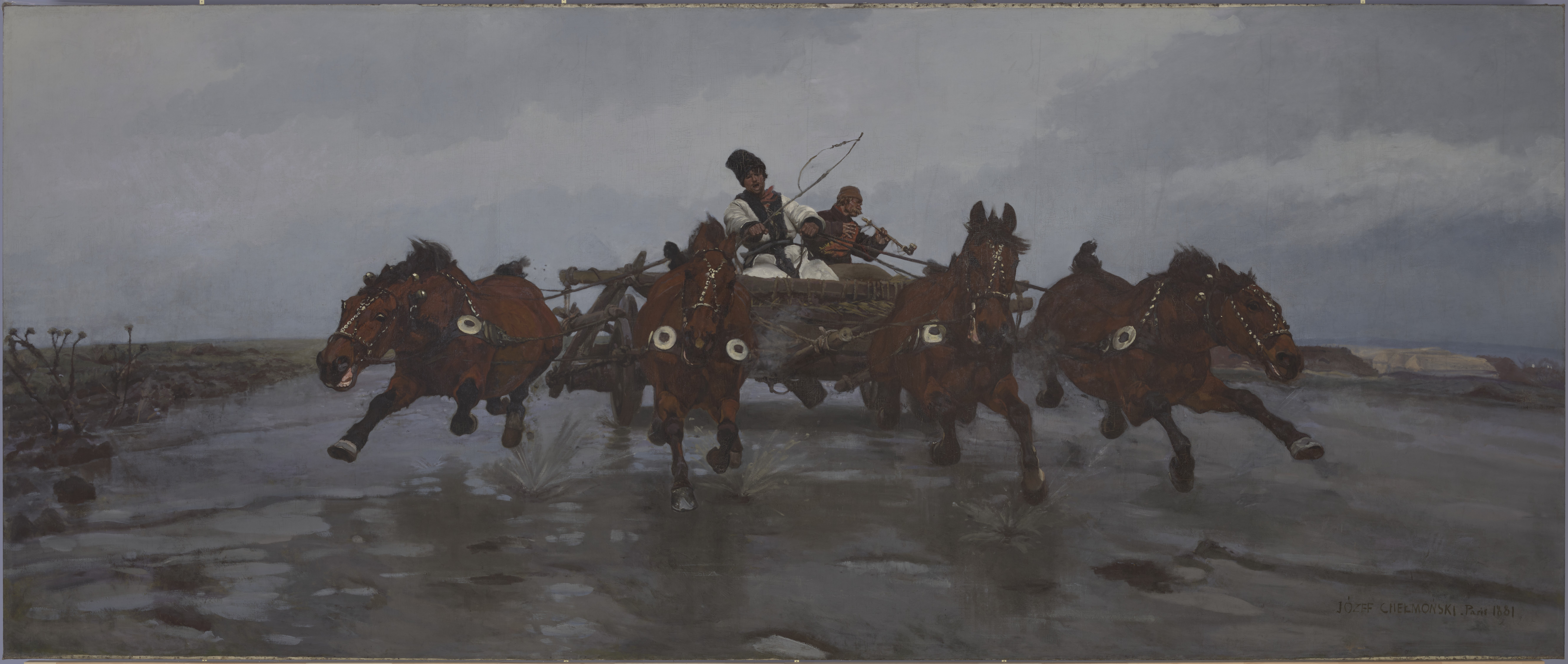
Four-in-hand, 1881

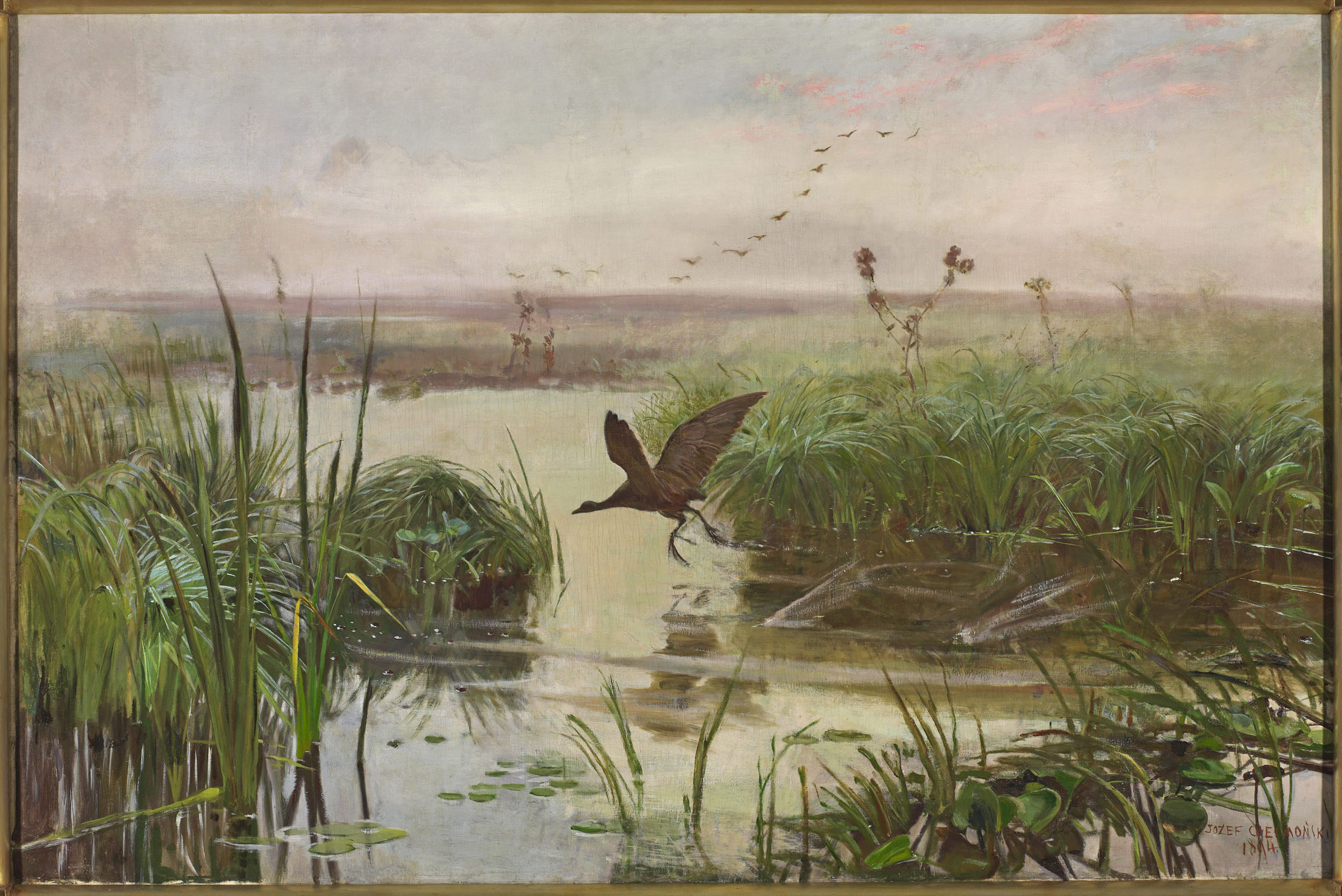
The Water Hen, 1894

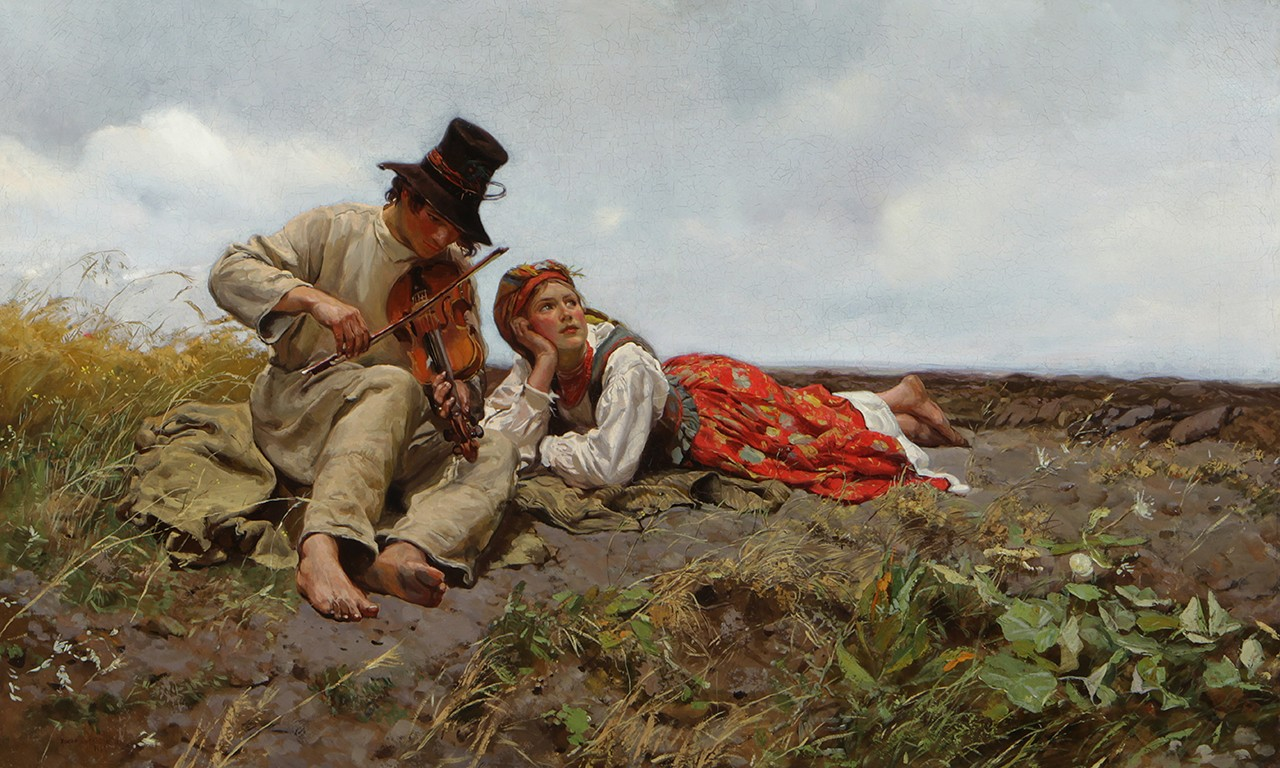
An Idyll. Before the Storm, 1885

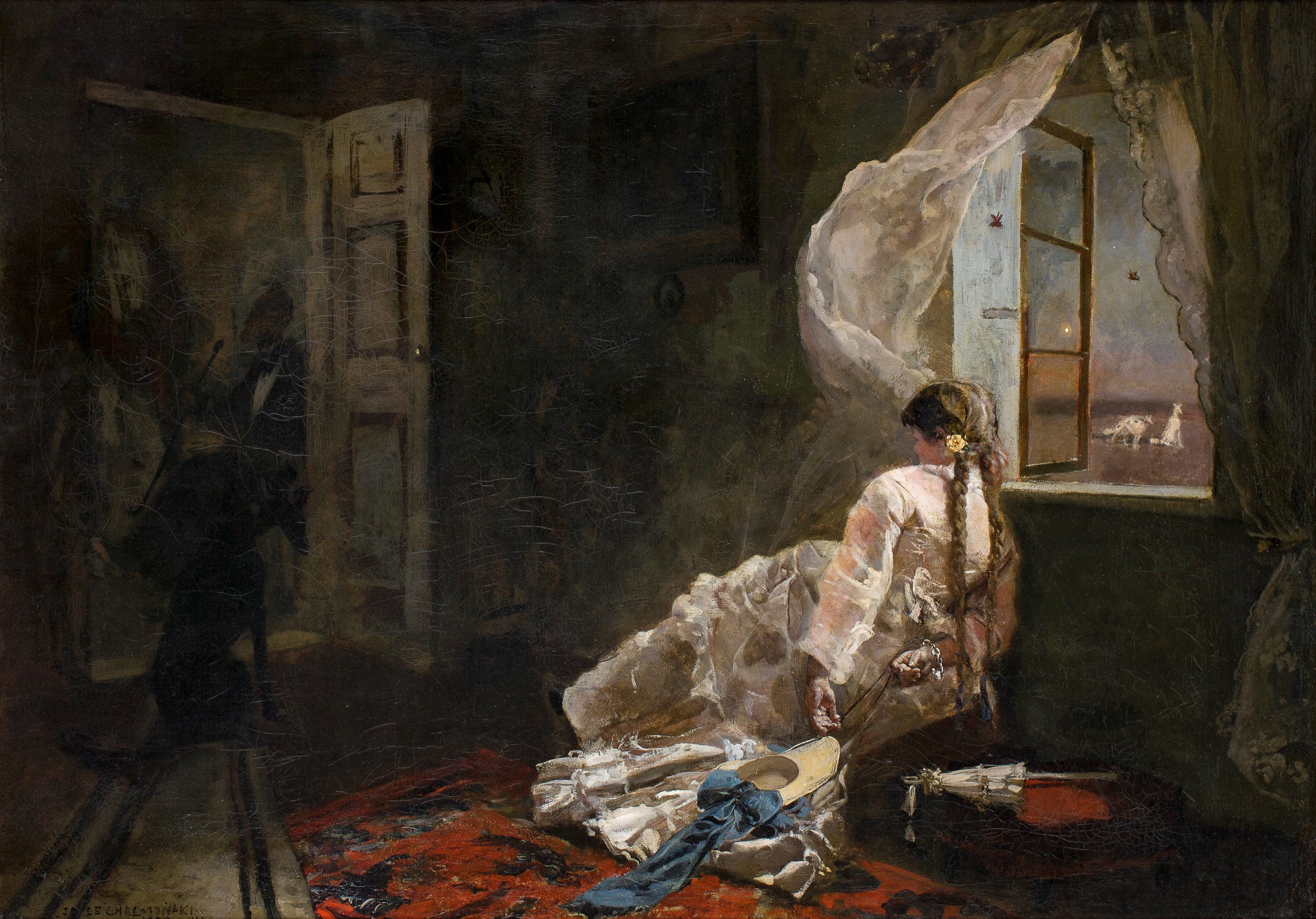
Summer Evening, 1875

== Bibliography ==
- Maciej Masłowski: Malarski żywot Józefa Chełmońskiego (Józef Chełmoński Painter's Life), Warsaw 1965, ed. "PIW" (ed.National Publishing Institute, 2nd edition - 1972);
- Maciej Masłowski: Józef Chełmoński, Warsaw 1973, ed. „Auriga” - Wydawnictwa Artystyczne i Filmowe (Art and Film Publishers).
