= Four-in-hand (painting) =

1881 painting by Józef Chełmoński

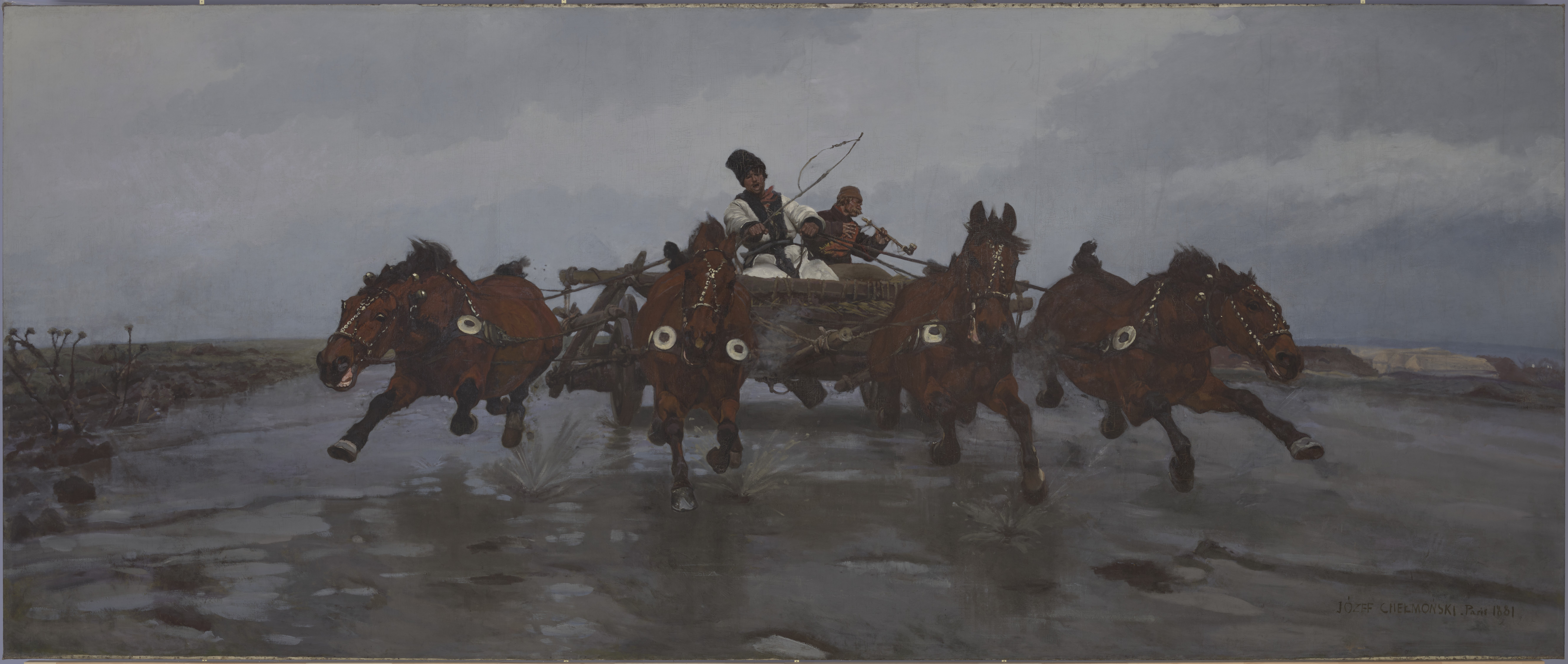
- Artist: Józef Chełmoński
- Year: 1881
- Medium: Oil on canvas
- Movement: Realism
- Dimensions: 275 cm × 660 cm (108 in × 260 in)
- Location: National Museum in Kraków

Four-in-hand (Polish: Czwórka) is an oil painting created in 1881 by Józef Chełmoński, held at the Gallery of 19th-Century Polish Art in the Kraków Cloth Hall, a branch of the National Museum in Kraków.

== History ==
The work was created in Paris, where Chełmoński lived from 1875 to 1887. During this time, he created paintings inspired by his experiences in the Eastern Borderlands, including Podolia. These canvases attracted buyers, including those from the United States, which contributed to the artist's increased wealth. He received commissions from the art dealer Adolphe Goupil. Paintings by Józef Brandt, Juliusz Kossak, and Alexander Sándor Wagner, a professor at the Academy of Fine Arts in Munich, had a significant influence on Chełmoński's work.

After Chełmoński's return to Poland in 1887, the Four remained in the Parisian studio occupied by Władysław Podkowiński and Józef Pankiewicz. After the painting was brought back, it was acquired by the Kraków authorities for the local museum. Currently, the painting is part of the collection of the National Museum in Kraków. It is exhibited in the Gallery of 19th-Century Polish Art in the Cloth Hall. The painting is signed: JÓZEF CHEŁMOŃSKI.Paris 1881.

Copies of the painting exist, including in the collections of the Józef Piłsudski Institute in New York (97 x 233 cm, gift of Alexander Mełeń-Korczyński). In 2020-2024, extensive conservation work, combined with research on the painting's structure, was carried out.

== Description ==
The painting is a modified version of an earlier smaller composition "Four" from 1880. The canvas depicts a team of four horses driven by a man in a fur hat. The animals and people are depicted at a near life-size scale, with the horizon positioned at the center of the painting's height, thus above the eye's line of sight. The artist employed dynamic foreshortening: the team rushes straight toward the viewer, who observes its approach from the muddy ground. The horses are depicted galloping; white splashes of water are visible under their hooves, while their legs appear to be already rising above the ground. The viewer can discern their closed eyes, open nostrils, and a transparent cloud of steam rising from the side of one of the animals. All parts of the harness are stretched, and their graphic extension is a whip held by the driver. His attire indicates peasant origins – it includes a shirt with a sleeveless caftan and a papakha – a cap typical of Eastern Europe and the Caucasus region, for Cossacks and the inhabitants of Podolia. The man is likely shouting at the horses or to his companion – his face is shown open-mouthed, his posture suggesting confidence and bravado. Behind the driver, a man in a cap and caftan is shown smoking a pipe. The passenger is identified as a nobleman, traveling by horse-drawn carriage through the empty stretches of present-day Ukraine.

This large-format canvas, measuring over six and a half meters in length, depicts a team of four horses racing towards the viewer, driven by a Ukrainian peasant. The animals, captured in a frenetic gallop, seem to burst the surface of the painting, creating the illusion of unstoppable, constant motion. The impression of movement is enhanced by the contrast of the liveliness of the main motif with the static background – a vast, monotonous landscape that seems to recede into the depths of the canvas, as well as the use of a limited palette. The artist also captured the peasant's exuberant temperament and the unbridled imagination and self-reliance of the borderland nobility.

== Other versions and sketches ==
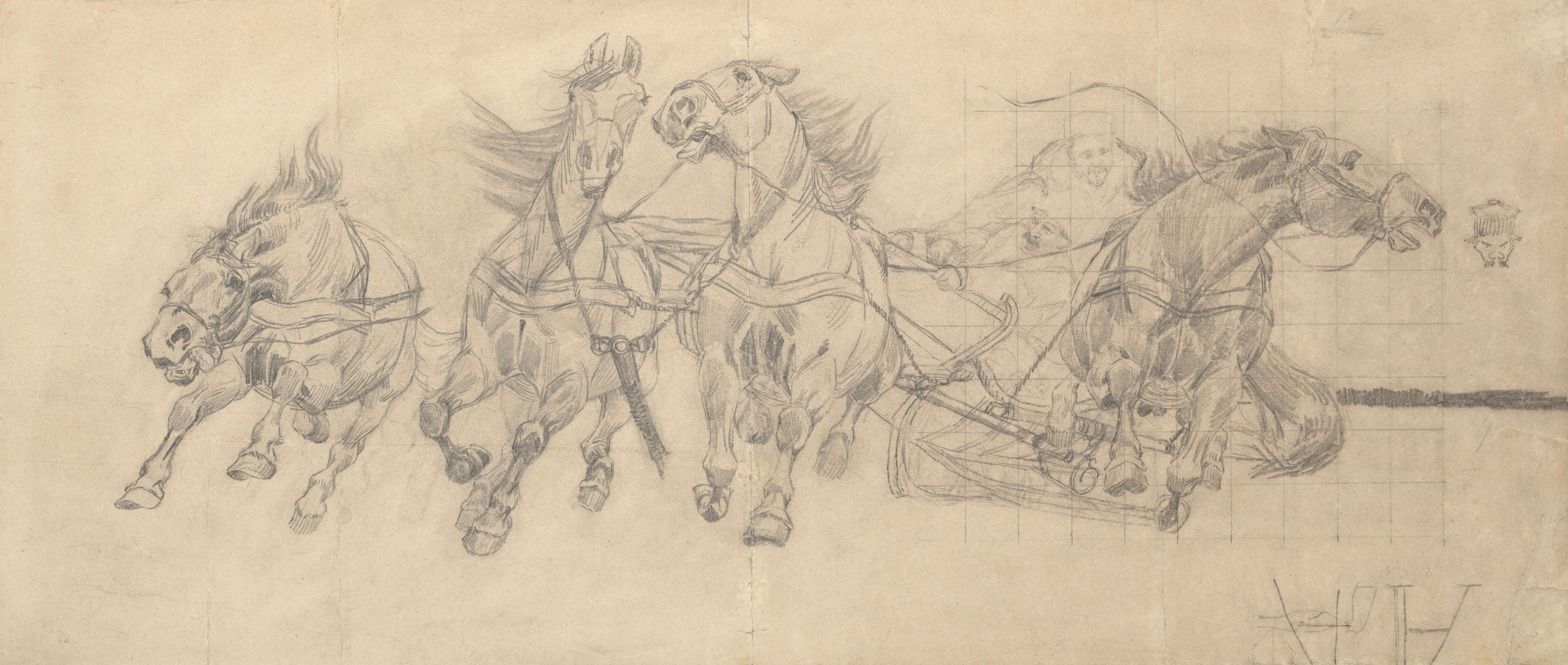
Józef Chełmoński, Study of galloping horses in harness, 1880

The motif of a speeding carriage recurred in Józef Chełmoński's work in numerous depictions. The closest approximation to the composition of Four-in-hand is a painted sketch measuring 52.5 x 109 cm, now belonging to the collection of the National Museum in Warsaw. The Warsaw collection also contains Chełmoński's drawing studies of speeding horses.

== Research and conservation ==
Due to exhibitions and handling, the surface of the painting was subjected to stresses that caused cracks in the paint and varnish. As a result of being rolled and unrolled several times, typical vertical cracks in the paint layer appeared on the painting's surface. The work was previously conserved in the 1970s, during exhibitions in Switzerland and France. Since then, the varnishes and retouching of the damaged painting have become discolored, creating stains that affected the appearance and color of the painting, different from the original composition. The greenish hues of the translucent layers blurred the contrast between cool and warm colors on the canvas and flattened perspective.

The most recent conservation work has been related to an inter-museum, interdisciplinary project Chełmoński, conducted in Poland between 2020 and 2024. A team of curators, conservators, chemists, and other specialists engaged in the project, examined the artist's painting legacy. The research uncovered unknown paintings and clarified numerous previously unresolved issues related to his oeuvre, conserved dozens of paintings, examined Chełmoński's creative process, and determined his palette. The painting was examined, UV, IR and X-ray photographs were taken, material samples were examined, and non-invasive methods were used: visual analysis, X-ray fluorescence (XRF), as well as sample analysis using MO, SEM-EDS, FTIR, GC/MS techniques. The conservation activities concluded with a series of large monographic exhibitions of Józef Chełmoński at the National Museums in Warsaw, Poznań and Kraków in 2024 and 2025.
