= The Water Hen (painting) =

1894 painting by Józef Chełmoński

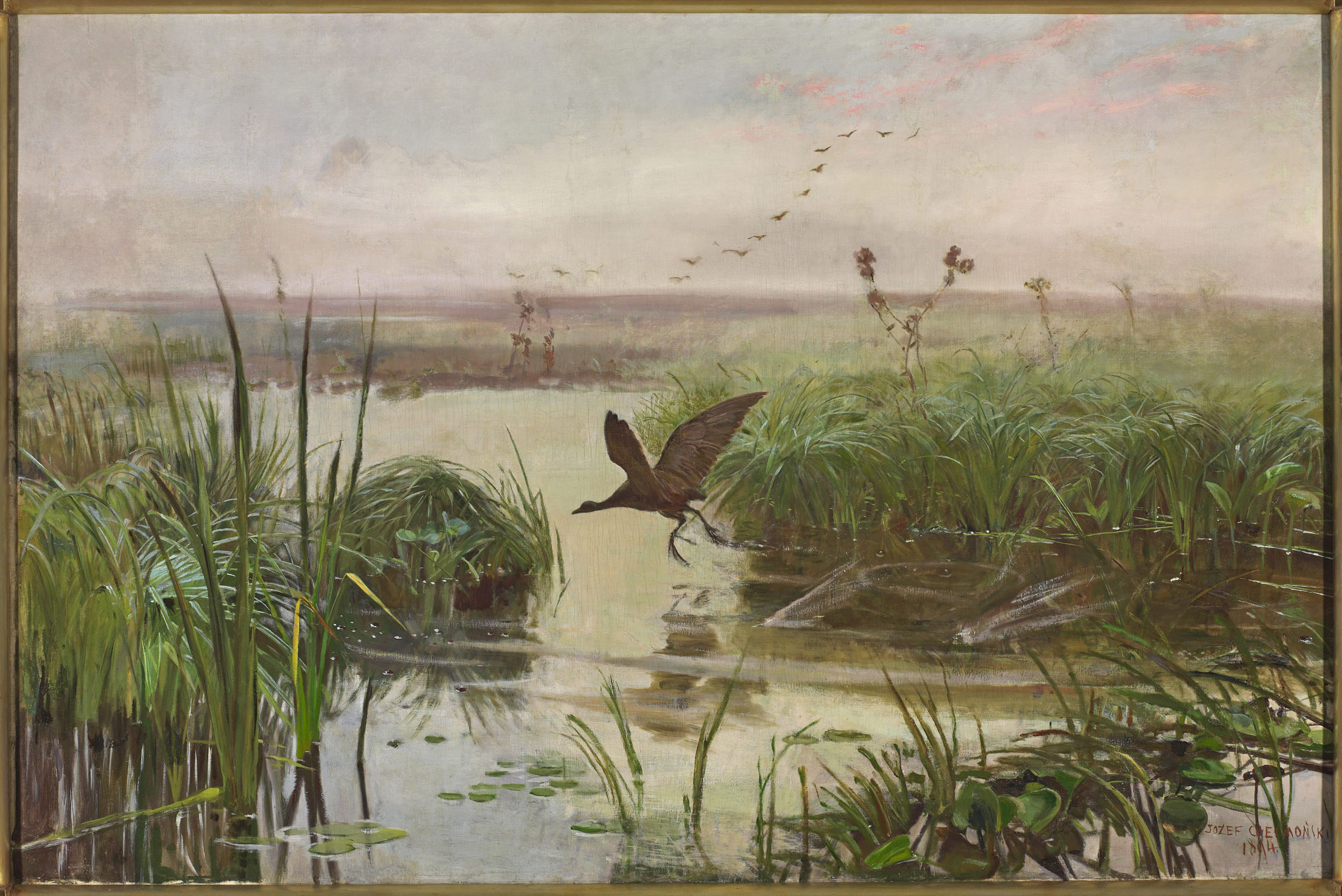
- Artist: Józef Chełmoński
- Year: 1894
- Medium: Oil on canvas
- Dimensions: 133 cm × 198.5 cm (52 in × 78.1 in)
- Location: National Museum, Warsaw

The Water Hen (Polish: Kurka wodna) is an oil painting by the Polish painter Józef Chełmoński, created in the spring of 1894. The work is signed in the lower right corner "Józef Chełmoński/1894". The painting is in the collection of the National Museum in Warsaw and is on permanent display in the 19th-century Polish Painting Gallery.

== History ==
Józef Chełmoński completed the painting in the spring of 1894, probably after observing nature in the vicinity of Guzów and Bolimów. The history of the artwork has been traced to 1945, when its owner was Bolesław Tarkowski, who deposited it at the Commercial Bank in Warsaw. In May 1950, the Commercial Bank transferred it as a long-term loan to the National Museum in Warsaw. In March 1953, the ownership of the painting was transferred to the museum by decision of the Minister of Finance. In 1959-1962 it was on long-term loan to a branch of the National Museum in Łowicz, then in 1963-1977 on loan to the National Museum in Lublin.

The painting has been presented at a monographic exhibition presenting Józef Chełmoński's work at the National Museum in Warsaw from September 27th, 2024 to january 26th, 2025, as well as in the National Museum in Poznań between March and June 2025.

== Description ==
The painting shows an early morning over a pond overgrown with reeds, seen at dawn. In the center of the composition, above the water surface, a bird, the titular water hen, takes flight. In the foreground we see a silvery water surface and lush reeds. The bird, painted in dark browns and pinks, spreads its wings wide and flies away from the viewer, giving the impression of being startled. In the background the backwaters are covered with morning mist. In the distance, a flock of birds is flying over the marshes.

X-ray examination demonstrated that in the final phase of work, the canvas was enlarged on the left side. During conservation work in the 1980s, the scope of the extension was visible under ultraviolet light. Technological research has shown that the painting is not identical to a second work of the same title, kept in the family collection and presented at the exhibition of the "Towarzystwo Zachęty Sztuk Pięknych" art society in 1917.
