= Summer Evening (painting) =

1875 painting by Józef Chełmoński

- Wieczór letni
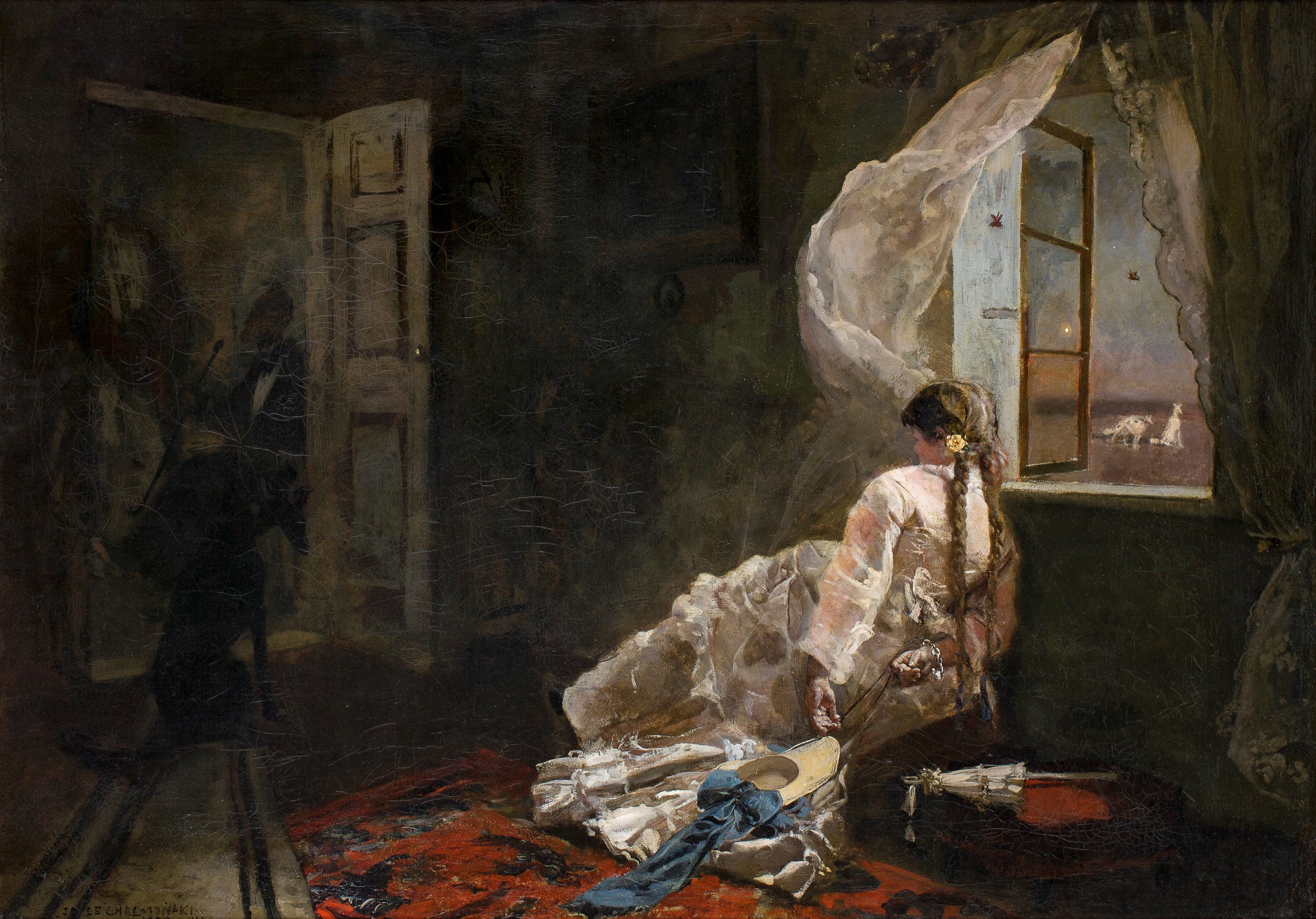
- Artist: Józef Chełmoński
- Year: 1875
- Medium: Oil on canvas
- Dimensions: 81 cm × 114 cm (32 in × 45 in)
- Location: National Museum in Poznań

Summer Evening is an oil painting by Józef Chełmoński created in 1875. Alternate, or supplemental, titles of the painting are "A memory of Ukraine", or "The Grey Hour" (Polish: Wspomnienie Ukrainy; Szara godzina). The painting belongs to the collection of the National Museum in Poznań.

== History ==
In 1874, Chełmoński rented a studio at the Hotel Europejski in Warsaw, which he shared with Adam Chmielowski and Stanisław Witkiewicz. He began painting Summer Evening during his most creative period, during which he created works such as the renowned Indian Summer. The painter was around 26 years old at the time of the work's creation. X-ray analysis conducted during restoration work showed that the artist painted over an earlier composition – originally, four horses and a carriage were drawn on the canvas by Antoni Adam Piotrowski. It is likely that the artists shared unfinished or abandoned canvases to help each other, considering modest financial means.

After the work was initially presented in February 1875 at the Warsaw Society for the Encouragement of Fine Arts, it received mainly negative reviews. In order to comply with the critical remarks, Chełmoński altered the image in several ways. The work gained recognition after the artist presented it in Paris, where in 1889 he was awarded the Grand Diplôme d'Honneur at the 1889 World's Fair.

The following year, the painting was lost after having been exhibited at a show of Chełmoński's works at the Warsaw Society for the Encouragement of Fine Arts. It had been considered lost for over a century. Historical records state that considerably later – during World War II – the painting was stored at the Złocieniec Villa in Komorów belonging to the Sławikowski family and was passed down to subsequent generations of the family. Restoration work undertaken in 2023 confirmed Chełmoński's authorship. On June 17th, 2023, the National Museum in Poznań purchased Summer Evening at an auction for 4.32 million Polish złoty, which has been the highest price for which any painting by Chełmoński ever sold, as of October 2024.

The National Museum in Kraków has two sketches for this painting in its collection.

== Description ==
The oil painting depicts a dark room, in which a young woman in a white, finely crafted dress, turned sideways to the viewer, sits while leaning against the window frame. Her pose may suggest expectation or weariness. Her hands, clasped behind her back, hold the strings of a straw hat with a blue bow. Her brown hair is styled in two braids, with navy blue ribbons woven into them; she also wears a tea rose. A parasol, matching the woman's outfit, rests nearby. In the next room, a man is visible, wearing a tuxedo and white shirt, smoking a long-stemmed pipe; a barely visible servant stands next to him. A black dog sits between the rooms. A red carpet with blue strands decorates the floor. A white dog can be seen outside the window, and the curtains are blowing in the wind.

According to art historian Tadeusz Matuszczak, the woman portrayed in the work was likely Chełmoński's cousin. The scene has a dreamlike and mysterious character and bears little resemblance to other scenes known from the artist's popular paintings. Contrasts – a white, ethereal dress against an intensely red carpet, a lace curtain moving in the breeze against the subdued colours of the walls, the pastel colours against the darkness of the adjacent room – emphasise the atmosphere of mystery.

The painting measures 61 x 114 centimetres. It is signed in the lower left corner: J. CHEŁMOŃSKI / 1875, Warsaw.

== Details, sketch and X-ray images ==
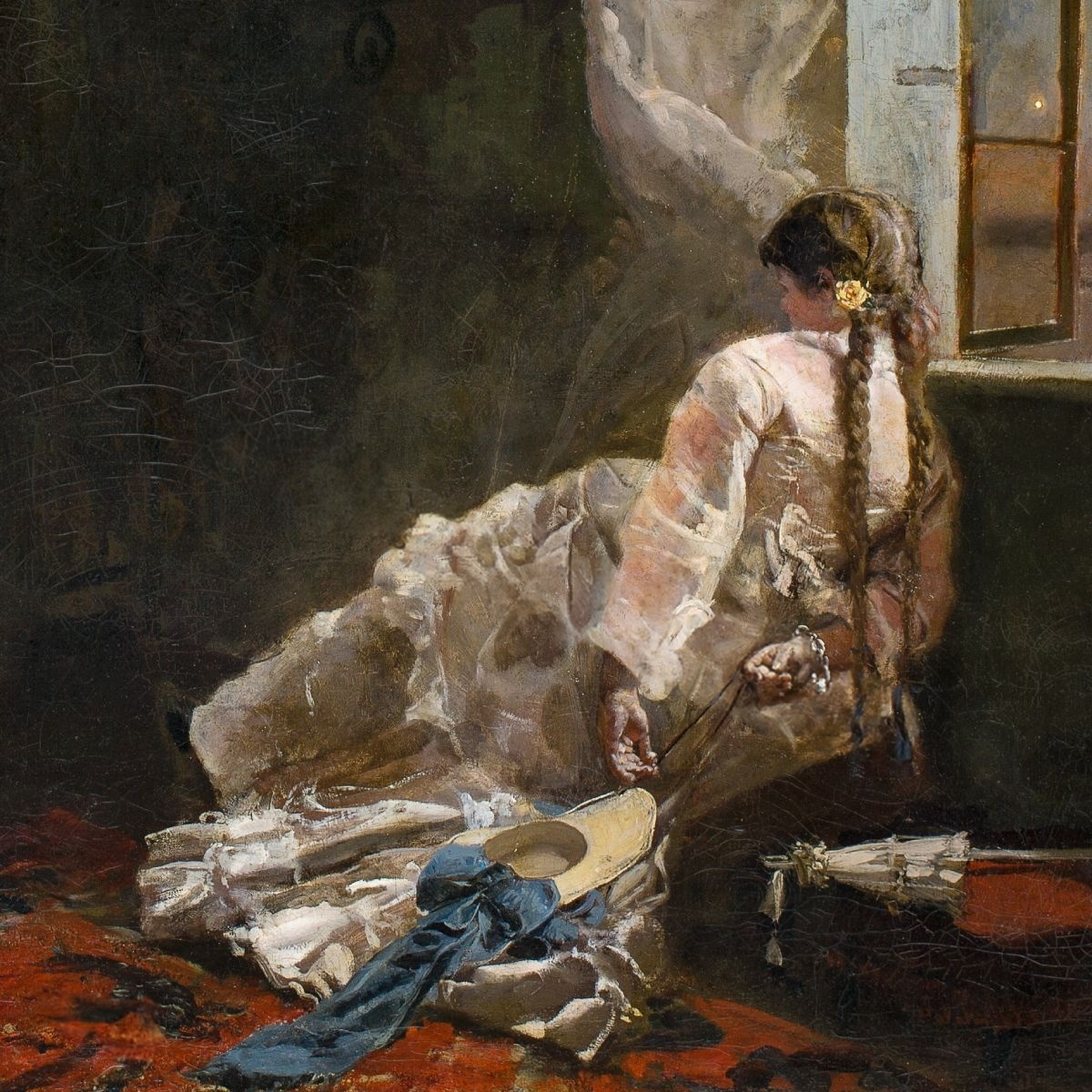
Detail

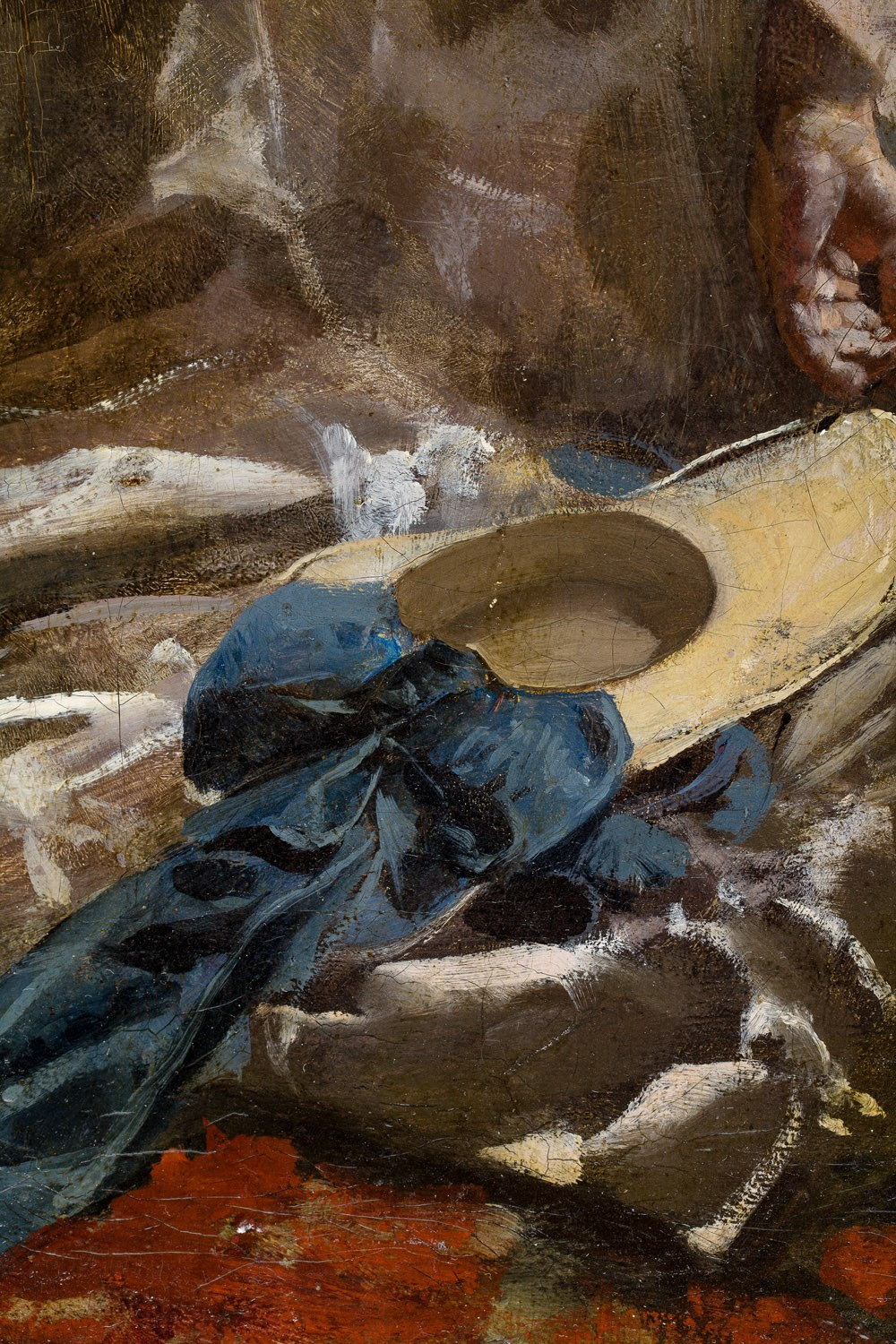
Detail - hat

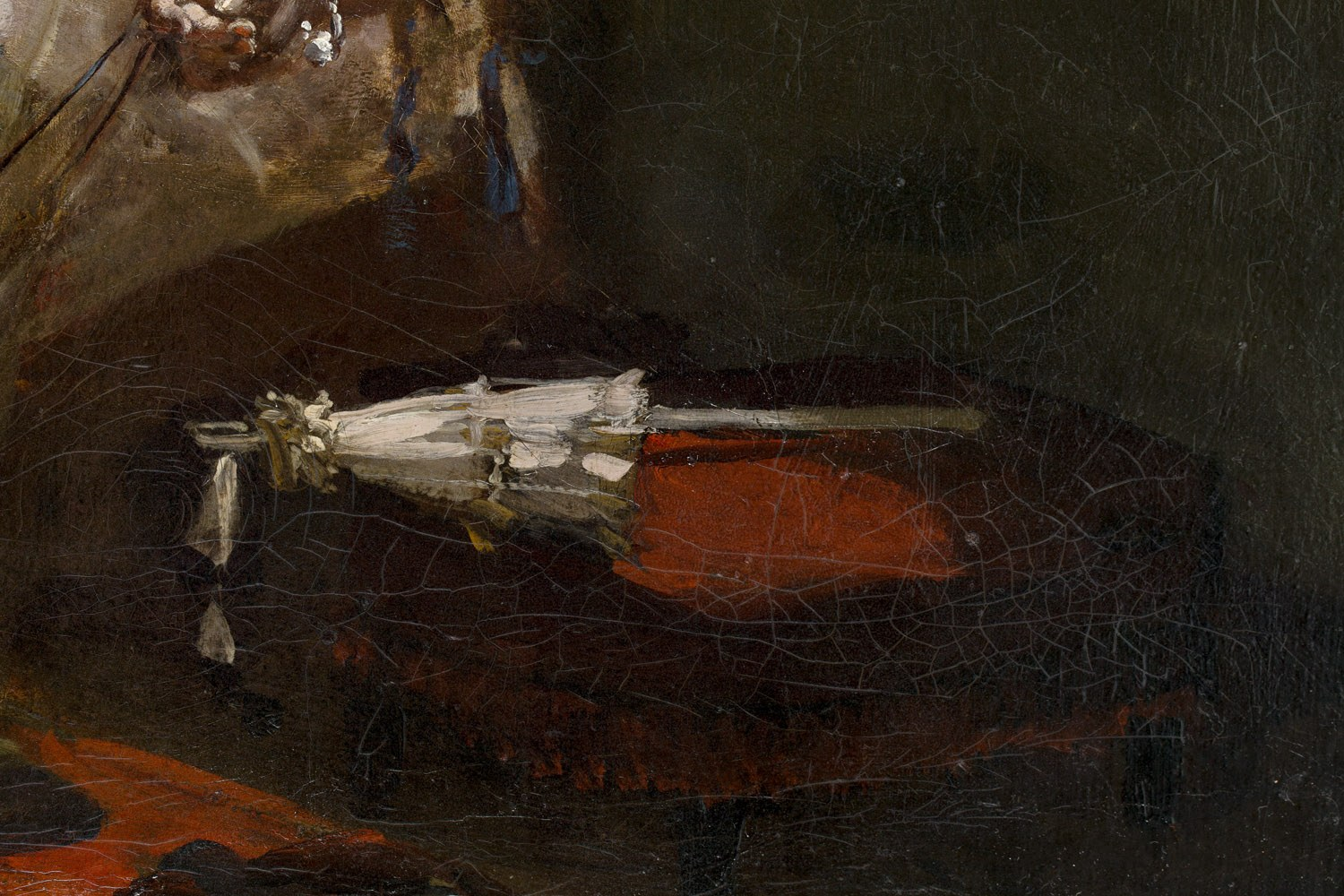
Detail - umbrella

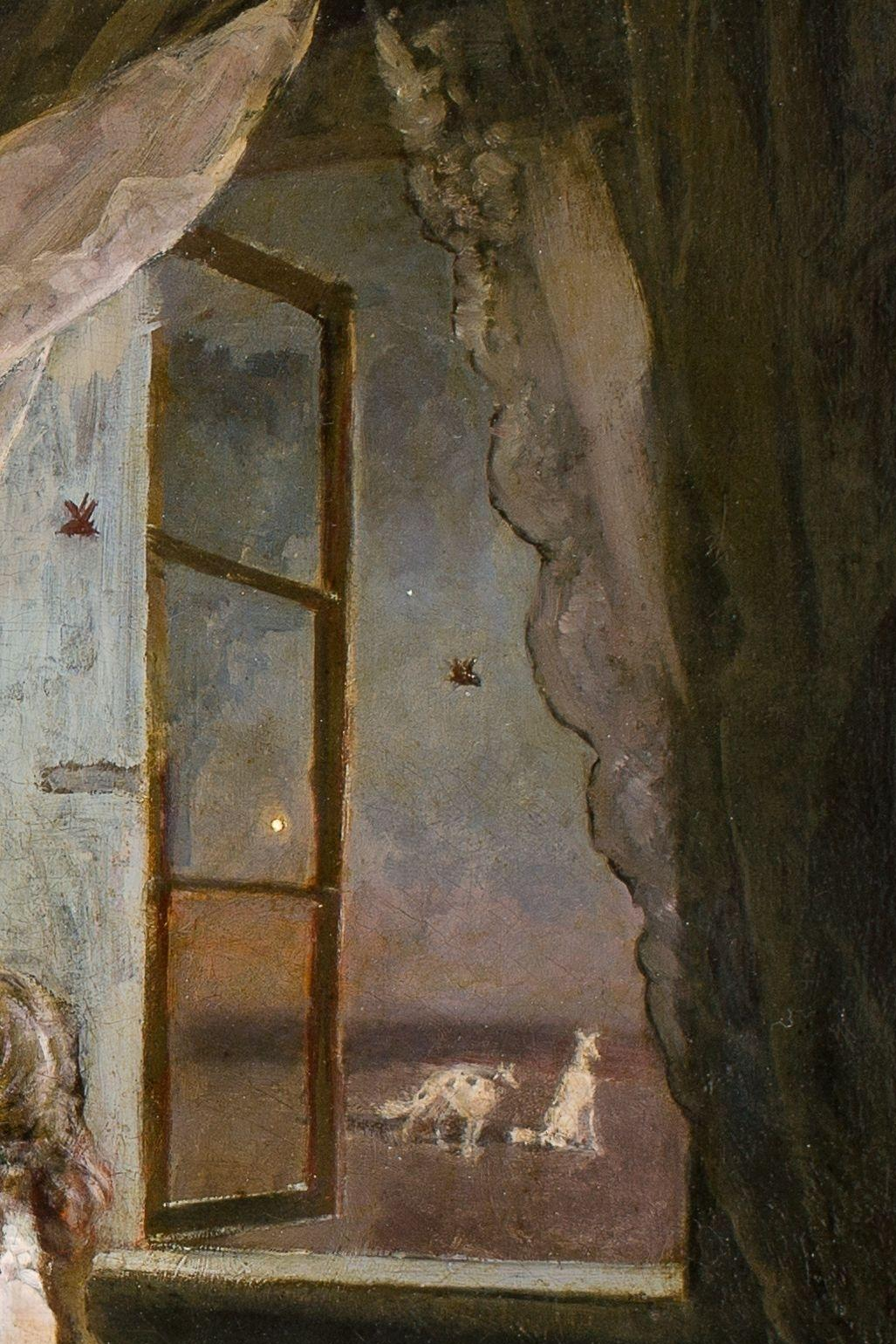
Detail - window

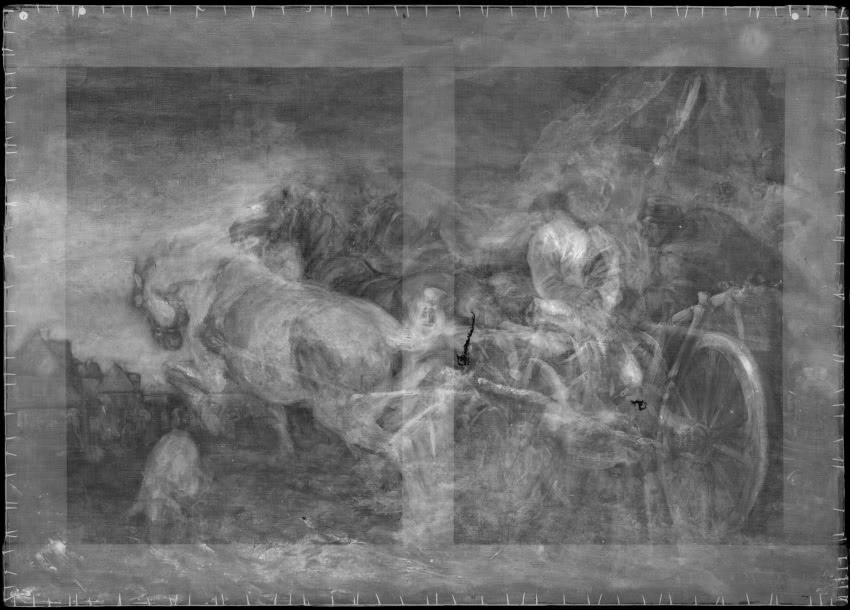
X-ray of the painting, sketch by Antoni A. Piotrowski is visible

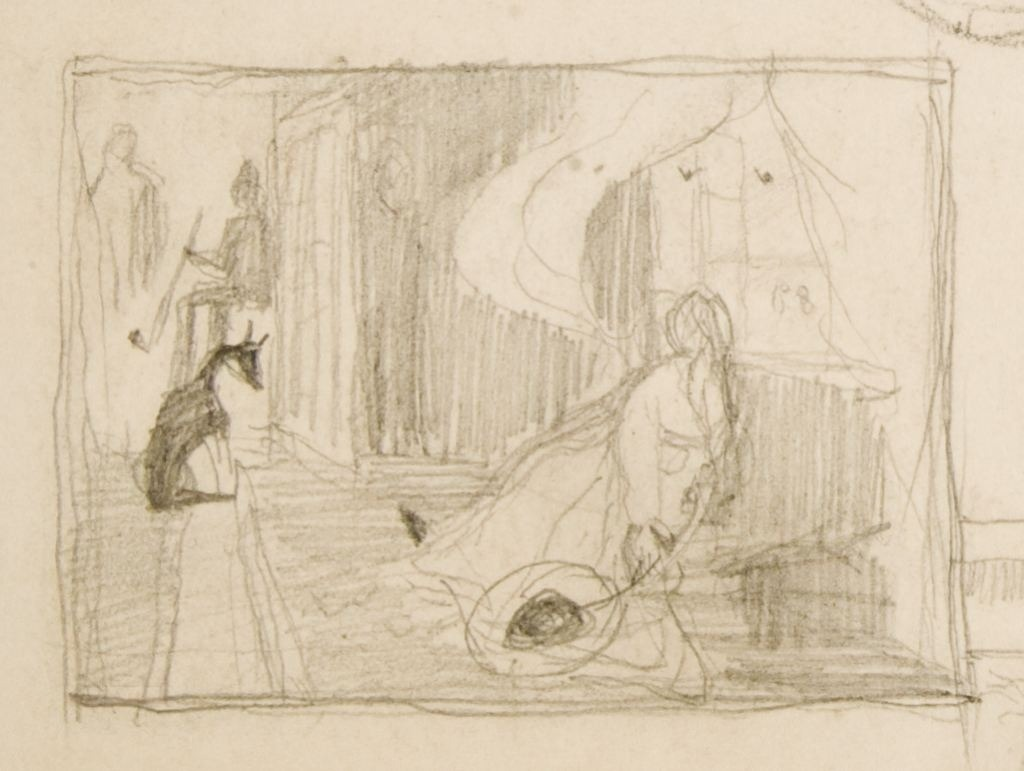
Artist's sketch

== See also ==
- Polish art
