= Kuklówka Zarzeczna =

- Village
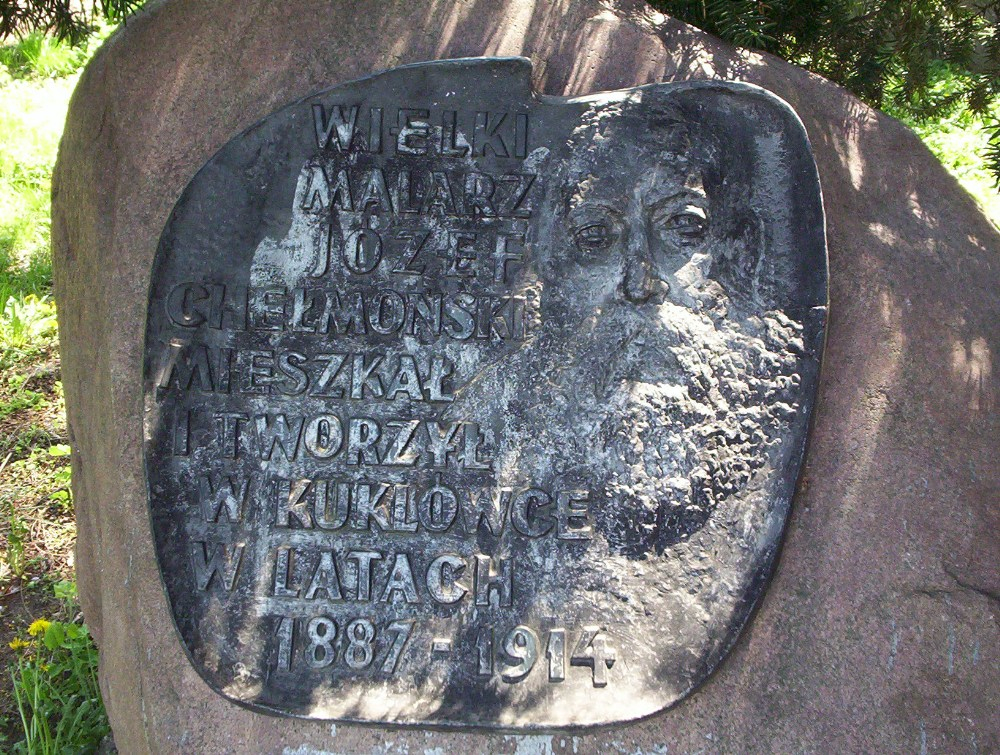
- Tablet on monument to Józef Chełmoński, Kuklówka Zarzeczna, Poland

- Location within Poland
- Coordinates: 52°2′22.8″N 20°36′24.1″E
- Country: Poland
- Voivodeship: Masovian
- County: Żyrardów
- Gmina: Radziejowice

Kuklówka Zarzeczna [kuˈklufka zaˈʐɛt͡ʂna] is a village in the administrative district of Gmina Radziejowice, within Żyrardów County, Masovian Voivodeship, in east-central Poland.

In Kuklówka, there is a historic Józef Chełmoński manor house dating back to the second half of the 19th century, along with a manor park. The renowned Polish painter Józef Chełmoński lived and worked here from 1889 to 1914. Many of the artist's famous works were created there. Currently, Chełmoński's descendants live in the manor house, and it is not open to the public.
