= Józef Chełmoński's Manor House in Kuklówka Zarzeczna =

Historic building in Poland

Coordinates: 52°02′32″N 20°35′59″E

Józef Chełmoński's manor house
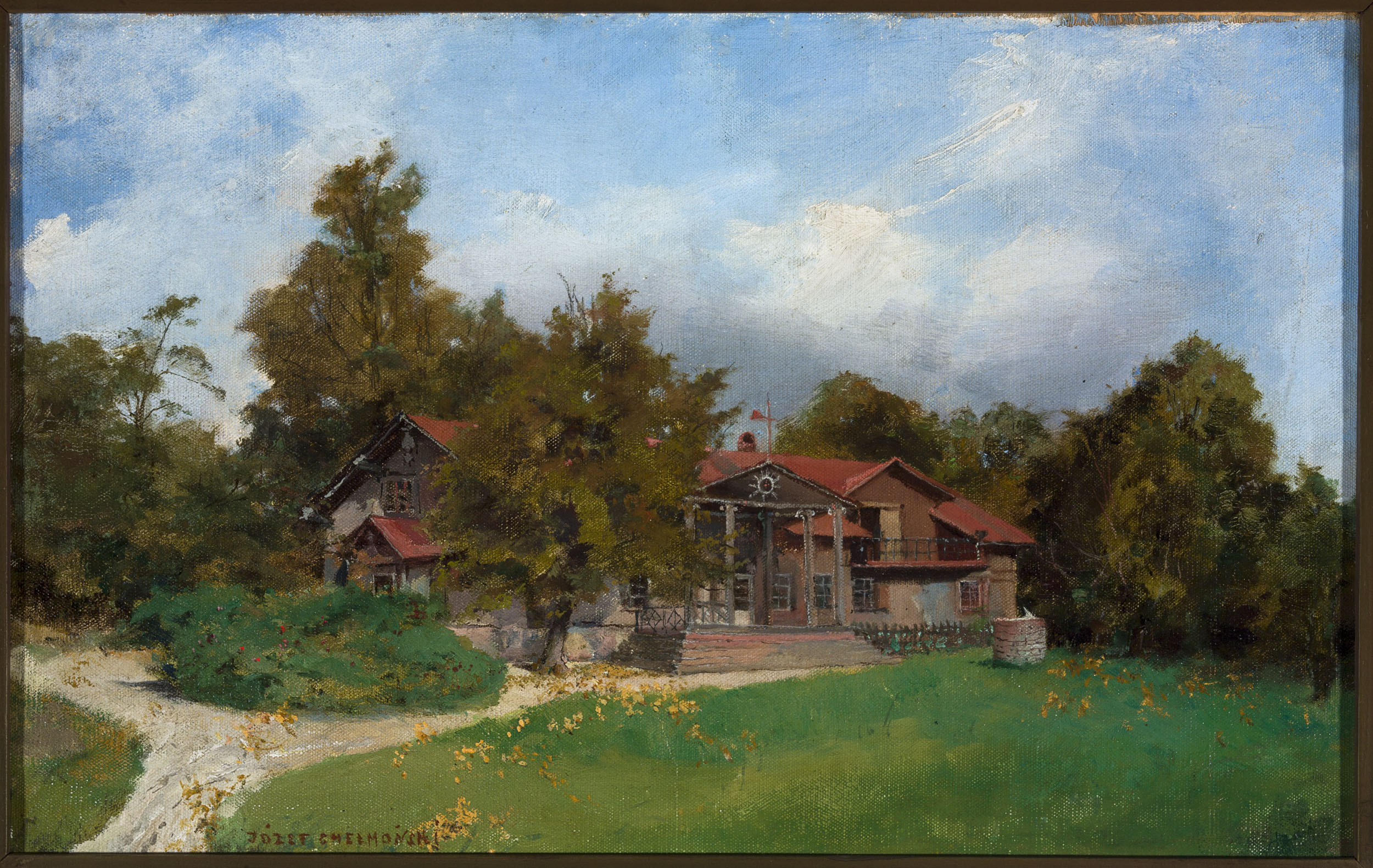
- The manor house in Kuklówka, painted by Józef Chełmoński. The painting is entitled Villa in the Garden
- Interactive map of the Józef Chełmoński's manor house area

General information
- Location: Kuklówka Zarzeczna, Masovian Voivodeship, Poland

Józef Chełmoński's Manor House in Kuklówka Zarzeczna is a wooden manor house in Kuklówka Zarzeczna, Żyrardów County, dating from the second half of the 19th century, listed in the registry of immovable monuments of the Masovian Voivodeship. It belonged to the painter Józef Chełmoński, who lived and worked there for approximately 25 years, and subsequently became the property of his descendants. An oil painting entitled Villa in the Garden, depicting the manor house, created by Chełmoński, is in the collection of the National Museum in Warsaw.

== History ==
The building was built in the second half of the 19th century (around 1880). After returning from Paris in 1887, Józef Chełmoński traveled extensively, visiting Lithuania and Russia. He then bought the manor house in Kuklówka from Judge Lubasiewicz and also acquired a 6-hectare farm in the summer of 1889. His family, including his three adolescent daughters, also moved permanently to the manor house. The farm buildings were expanded, and additional arable land was purchased.

The painter then lived there alone after the breakup of his marriage until the end of his life, i.e., until 1914; his wife, Maria née Korwin Szymanowska, left Kuklówka in 1894. He took care of the farm and horses alone, dressing like peasants from Łowicz. The manor house was where paintings such as Partridges, Shepherd, and Plough were created. During this period, the subject matter of Chełmoński's works changed; he moved away from depicting dynamic, expressive scenes. The painter's guests who visited Kuklówka included Wojciech Gerson, Antoni Kurzawa, Henryk Weyssenhoff, and Stanisław Masłowski. The artist bequeathed the manor house to his three daughters. He died in the manor house on April 6, 1914. He spent a total of approximately 24 years there.

On March 23, 1962, the building was entered into the provincial register of immovable monuments. The manor house was rebuilt several times, the decorative portal was removed, and the ring with a Zodiac motif above the entrance has not survived. The building remains in the possession of the painter's descendants (Chełmoński's great-grandson, Stanisław Aust, currently lives at the house) and is not open to the public.

== Architecture ==
The building is located in Kuklówka Zarzeczna at 36 Józefa Chełmońskiego Street. Its area is 227 m². It is a modest residential building, constructed of larch wood, single-story, covered with a red gable roof, and features an asymmetrically placed veranda. The veranda is glazed, and above the windows are decorations with plant motifs reminiscent of folk papercuts. The original decorations were added by Chełmoński himself. In the attic was the painter's studio, which was glazed and had been built from the attic. On the wall of one of the rooms hung a framed letter written by Adam Mickiewicz. An oak avenue leads to the manor house.The building is surrounded by a park.
