= Liber amicorum =

Liber amicorum (Latin for 'book of friends') may refer to:

- Album amicorum, a collection of friends' signatures and drawings
- Festschrift, a scholarly anthology in honour of a distinguished colleague
