= Hegel House =

Coordinates: 48°46′23″N 9°10′37″E

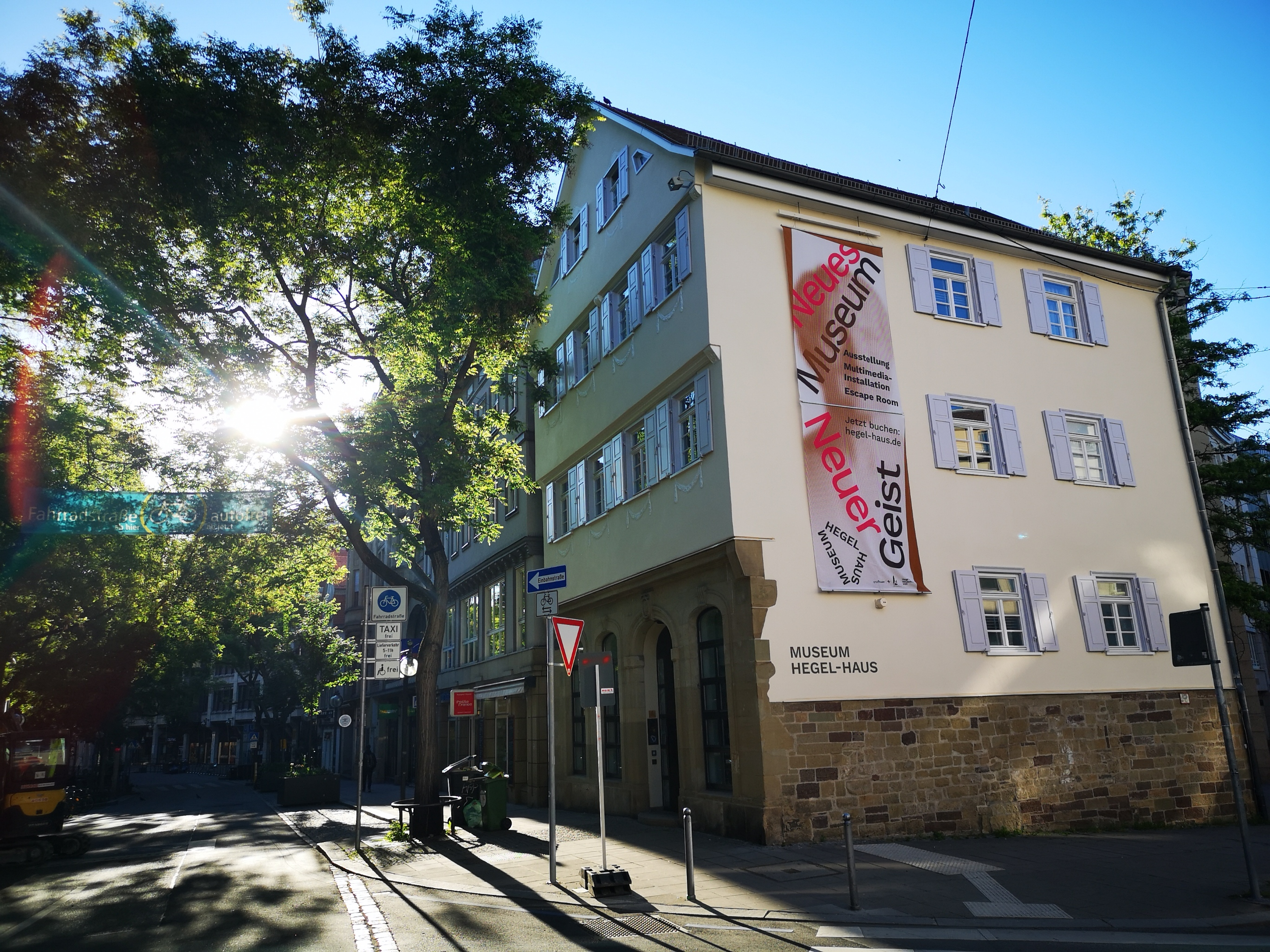
Hegelhaus, Eberhardstraße 53, Stuttgart-Mitte

The Museum Hegel House (German: Museum Hegel Haus) is a museum in Stuttgart, Germany.

It is situated in the house where the renowned philosopher Georg Wilhelm Friedrich Hegel was born in 1770. Hegel's first 18 years unfolded in Stuttgart, shaping his early life. He later died in Berlin in 1831.

Dating back to the 16th century, the house on Eberhardstraße 53 in Stuttgart has served as a museum dedicated to Hegel's life and work since 1991. It is part of the Stadtmuseum Stuttgart museum family.

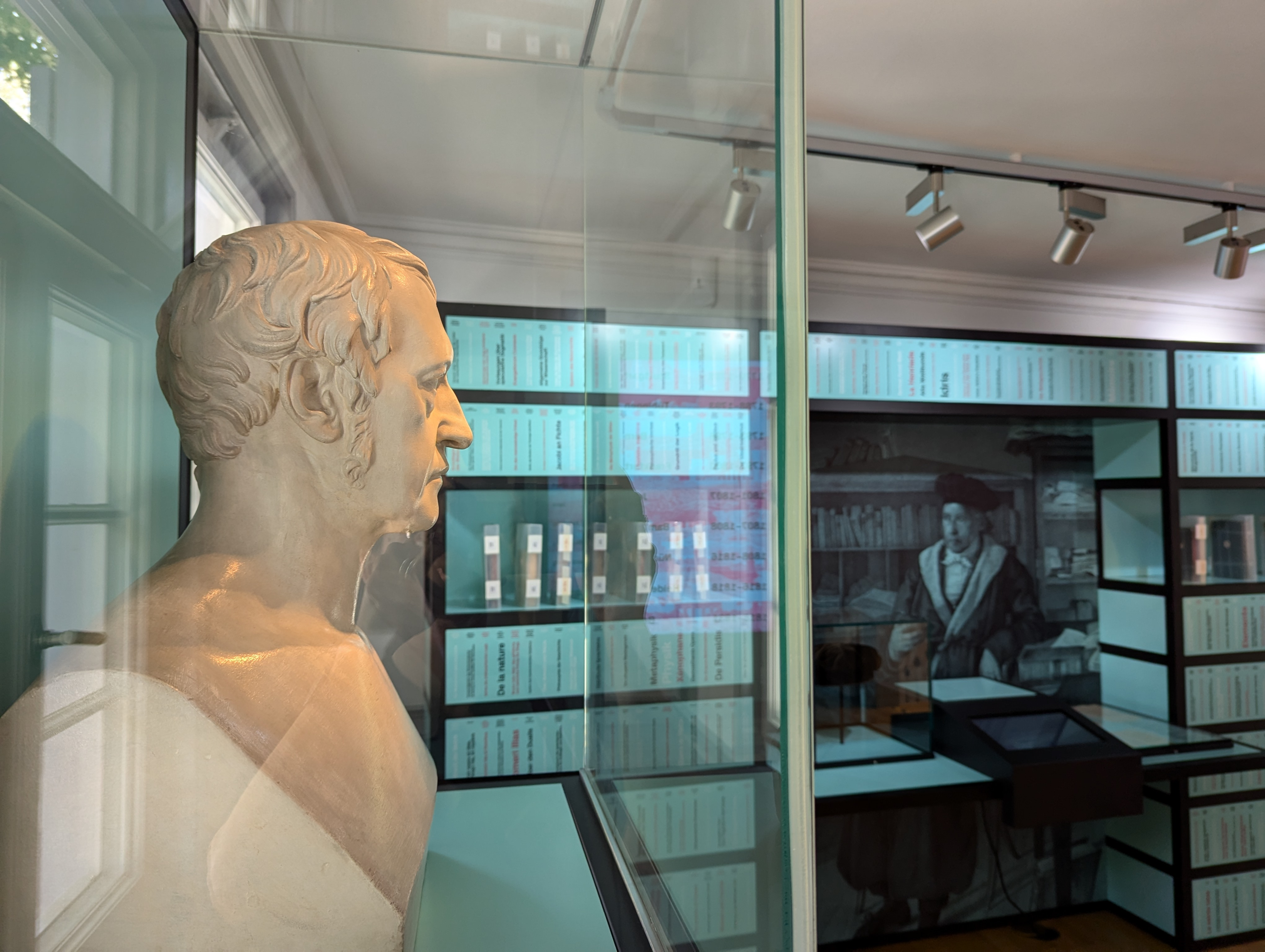
Bust of Hegel

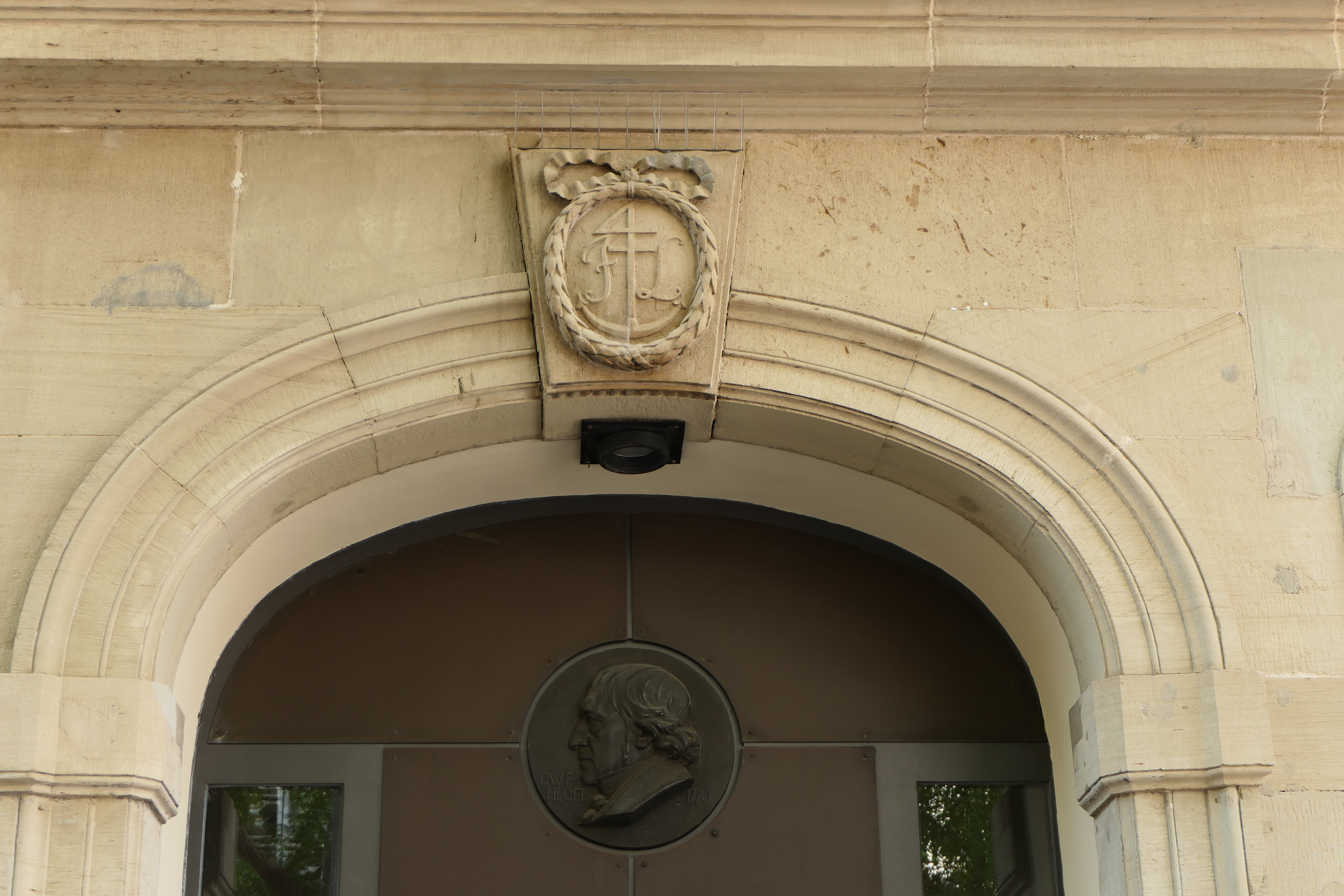
Hegel's portrait at the entrance to the Hegelhaus Stuttgart

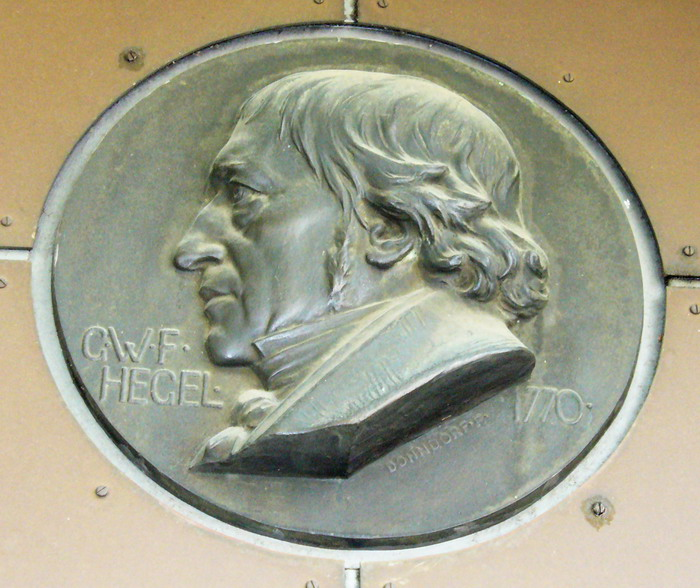
Bust of Hegel on the house's exterior

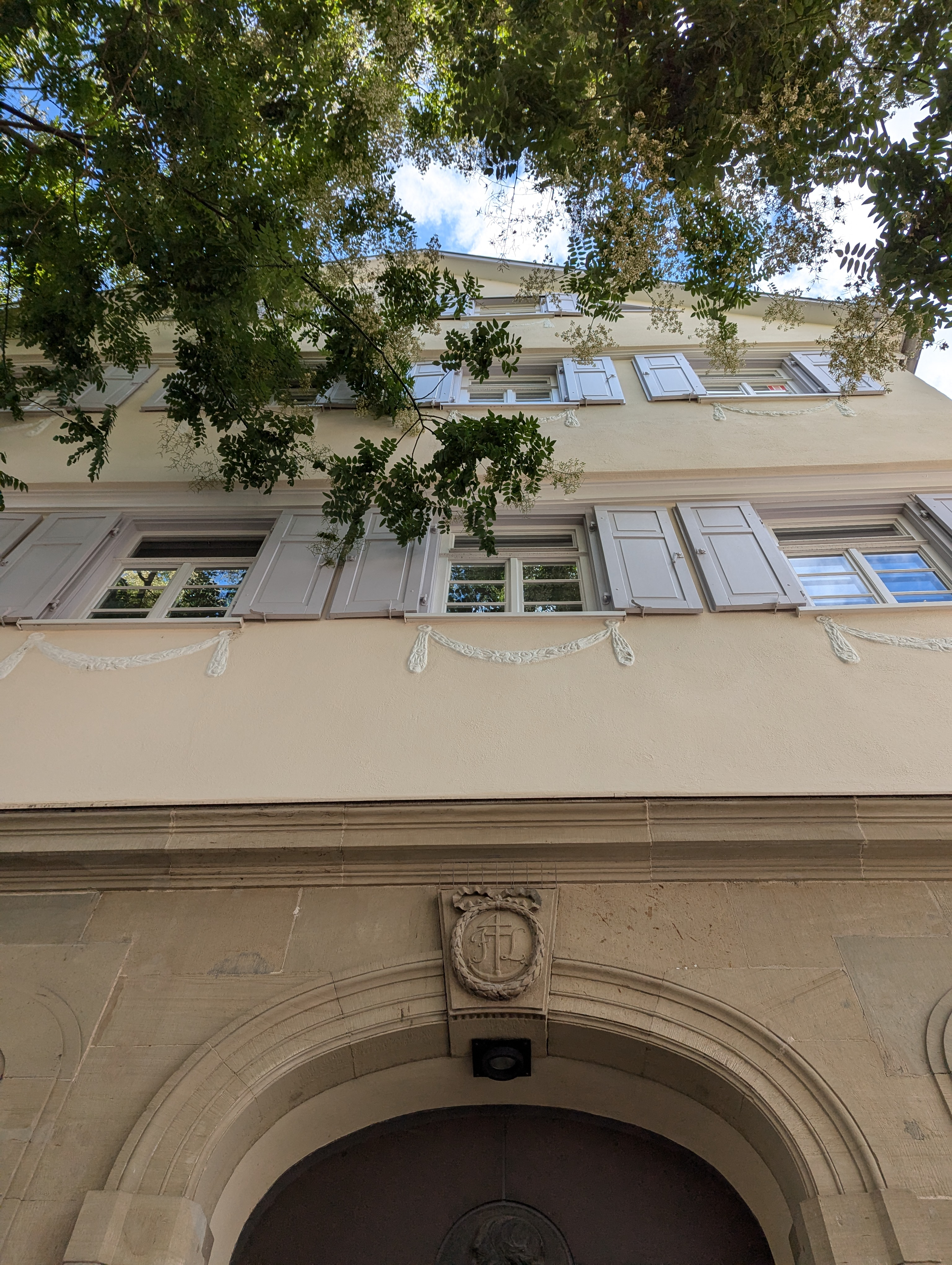
Front facade of the Hegel House in Stuttgart

After undergoing renovation work, the museum reopened on August 27, 2020, Hegel's 250th birthday. The permanent exhibition, displayed since the museum's establishment, has been extensively updated to include original objects related to Hegel, such as his famous Barrett and his family register (an early form of friendship book). The exhibition also features a multimedia room installation and spread across three floors, interactive stations, and a small library.

Visitors are welcomed by an 18-minute prelude with subtitles in English and Mandarin using projections and 3D technology. This prelude provides insights into Hegel's biography, philosophy, and 18th-century Stuttgart. The two actors, Walter Sittler and Nina Siewert, then give a virtual tour of the installation.

The permanent exhibition on the 1st and 2nd floors delves deeper into Hegel's life and extensive body of work, illustrating his life`s various stages and impact on subsequent generations of thinkers and the history of philosophy. The permanent exhibition is available in German, English, and Mandarin.

The Escape Room on the 2nd floor is a unique feature for a museum. As is usual in an escape room, visitors have to solve various tasks and apply one or two of Hegel's philosophical ideas. That way, you learn even more about Hegel's complete works.

Hegel also lived and worked in a house in Bamberg, where he served as the author of the Bamberg newspaper in 1807 and 1808. This house is also referred to as the Hegel House.
