= Daria Alyoshkina =

Ukrainian visual artist (1982–2026)

- Дарія Альошкіна
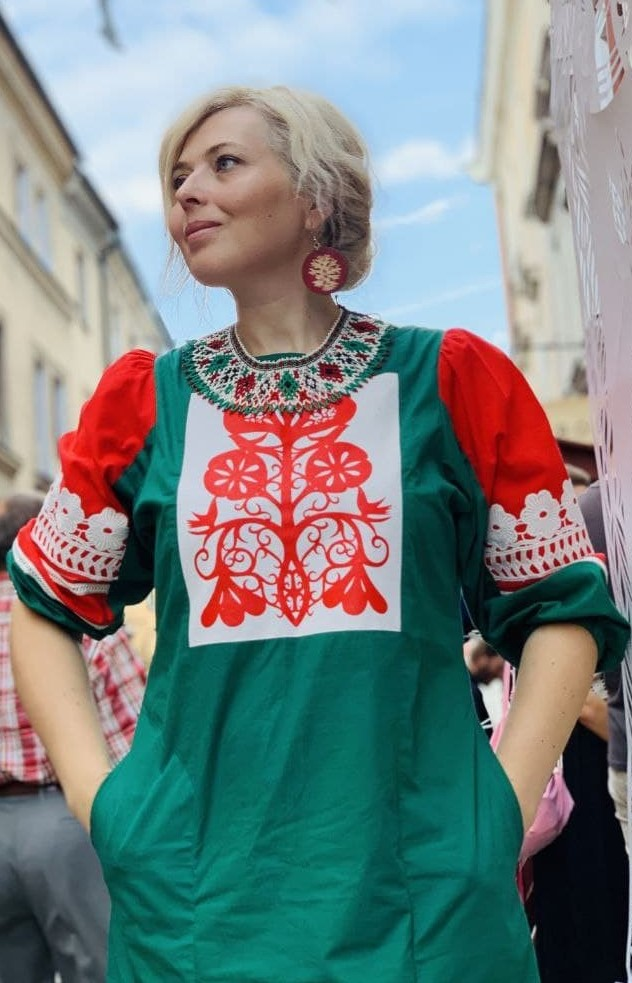
- Alyoshkina in 2022
- Born: 5 March 1982; Kyiv, Ukrainian SSR, Soviet Union
- Died: 15 August 2026 (aged 44)
- Known for: Vytynanka cut artworks
- Spouse: Hordiy Starukh

Daria Oleksiivna Alyoshkina (Ukrainian: Дарія Олексіївна Альошкіна; 5 March 1982 – 15 August 2026) was a Ukrainian papercutting artist, known for her large vytynanky.

== Life and work ==
Alyoshkina was born in Kyiv on 5 March 1982, to the artists Lyudmyla and Oleksiy Alyoshkin, who later moved to a village in the Vinnytsia Oblast. There, her parents created sculptures and pottery, painted, and raised five children.

She graduated from the Shkribliak College of Applied Arts in Vyzhnytsia in 2001 and from the Lviv National Academy of Arts in 2007 with a master's degree in monumental and decorative sculpture. Since 1996, she has participated in sculpture exhibitions and symposiums in Ukraine, Poland, and Lithuania. After the birth of her children, she turned to the art of paper cutting to balance her artistic development with family life. Inspired by the historical Ukrainian tradition of decorating windows with vytynanky, she developed her own technique for creating large-format paper artworks. Her paper cuttings are characterized by symmetry, achieved by folding the paper before cutting.

From 2010 onwards, Alyoshkina represented Ukraine at international events with monumental paper-cut works. In 2018, the French luxury brand Cartier adorned one of its boutiques with her paper cutouts. In 2019, Alyoshkina collaborated with Isabelle Deron on a window display as part of the Printemps Français festival in Kyiv.

Alyoshkina was married to the musician and master lira maker Hordiy Starukh. The couple had three children. Before the 2022 Russian invasion of Ukraine, the family lived and worked in Lviv.

Alyoshkina died on 15 August 2026, at the age of 44. A memorial service was held on 17 August at the Church of St. Clement the Pope in Lviv, and the artist's funeral was held the next day in the same church. Daria Alyoshkina was buried on 18 August in the Lychakiv Cemetery.

== Selected exhibitions ==
- 2018: Biennale at Révélations Grand Palais, Paris
- 2018: Decoration of Ukrainian stand, Maison et objet at Paris Design Week, Paris
- 2019: Exhibition of paper-cut art at the UN Headquarters, Geneva
- 2020: Biennale di Venezia at the invitation of the Michelangelo Foundation
- 2020: Lace of Memory. In the memory of the victims of the Great Famine in Ukraine (1932-1933). Willa Decjusza, Kraków
- 2021: Lace on Paper, Ivano-Frankivsk
- 2021: Futurespective: 30 Covers for Vogue UA of Ukrainian Artists,Kyiv Contemporary Art Center M17
- 2021: Paris Design Week, Ukrainian Cultural Center, Paris
- 2021: Two Projects, Nizza
- 2021: Shchedryk, National Museum in Lviv
- 2022: Ev. Hauptkirche St. Petri, Hamburg
- 2023: Venice Biennale of Architecture
- 2023: Biennale by the Révélations Grand Palais, Paris
- 2023: YouNique – Boutique Fair of Arts, Lugano
- 2024: Stille Poesie, Stadtmuseum Stuttgart
