= Stadtmuseum Stuttgart =

Museum in Germany

Coordinates: 48°46′34″N 9°11′3″E

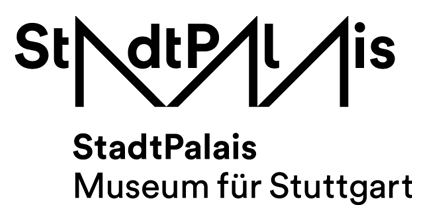
Logo

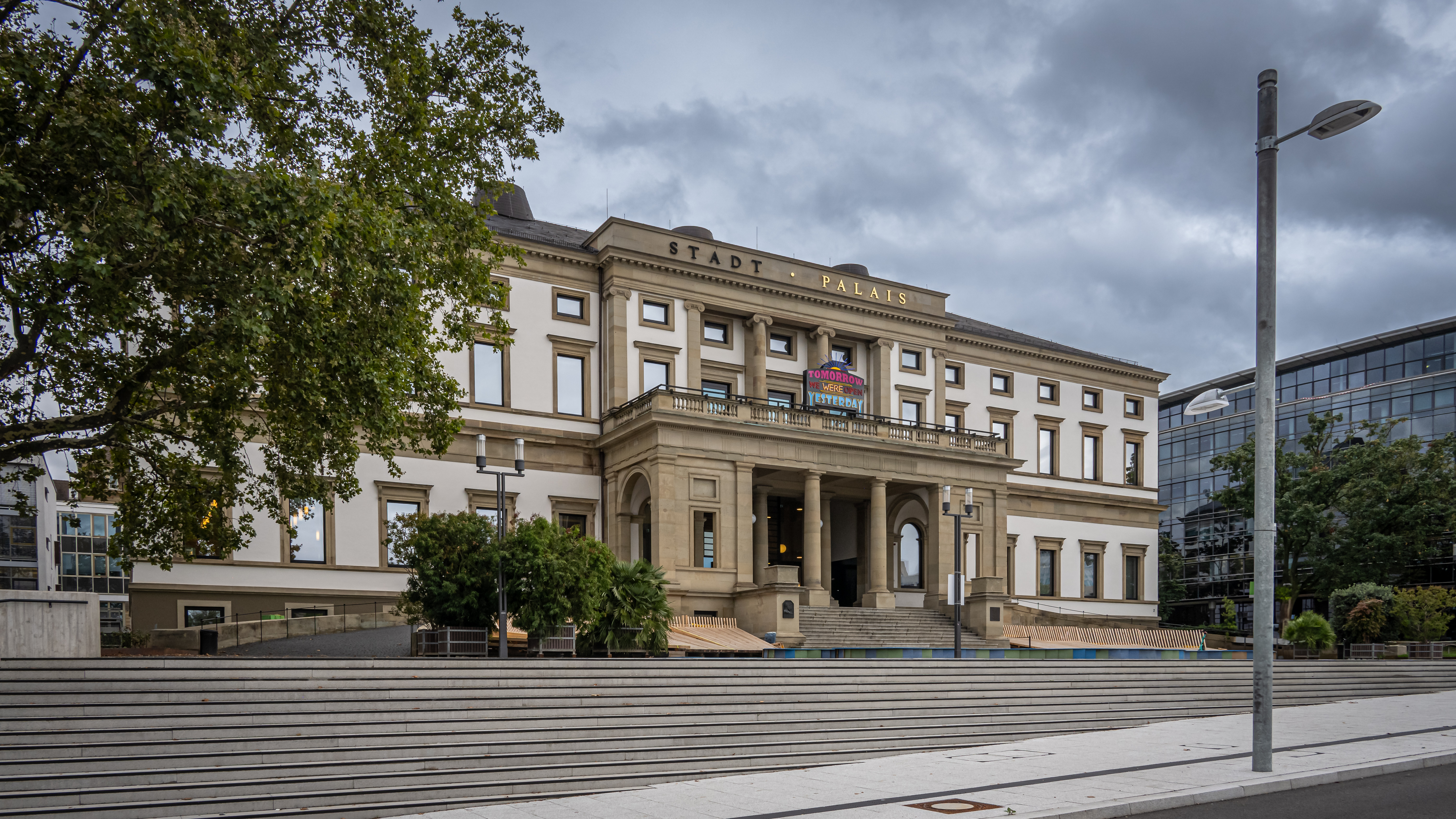
The StadtPalais in 2024

Stadtmuseum Stuttgart

The Stadtmuseum Stuttgart (City Museum Stuttgart) (proprietary name: StadtPalais – Museum for Stuttgart) is a museum about the history of Stuttgart. It was opened in April of 2018 in the Wilhelm Palais, the former residence of Württembergs last King William II. The Stadtbibliothek Stuttgart, the public library of the city of Stuttgart, was also housed there from 1965 until 2011.

== History ==
In 1998 Stuttgart's city council made the decision to build a new central library for the city. In 2011 the library at the Mailänder Platz in the Europaviertel was completed. Now that the library has moved the opportunity to create a museum about the city's history in the Wilhelm Palais arose. In 2009 a competition for the realization of such a museum was held. It was won by the office of Lederer+Ragnarsdóttir+Oei in cooperation with Jangled Nerves. After a makeover of their proposal, on 26 February 2010 the jury unanimously decided in favor of further processing the idea on the foundation of the proposal. After the opening of the new central library at the Mailänder Platz on 24 October 2011 the Wilhelm Palais was made temporarily available for cultural purposes. The renovation work began in late 2013 and lasted until 2018. The new StadtPalais was opened on 14 April 2018. The costs of the renovation and the establishment of the museum were estimated at €38.3 million including subsidies by the federal state Baden-Württemberg.

== Structure ==
The exhibition is essentially structured into four parts:

- foyer, event hall and special exhibition room (130 m²) on the ground floor
- permanent exhibition „Stuttgarter Stadtgeschichten“ (Stuttgart's City Stories) on the first floor (900 m²) and café
- special exhibition area on the second floor (450 m²) with a thematic focus on city history and architecture
- „Stadtlabor“ ("City Lab") on the garden floor (kids area with workshop on 450 m² + outdoor area)

== Management ==
head of the planning staff for the creation of the Stuttgart City Museum:

- Anja Dautschek (2007 – 2016)

directorate:

- Torben Giese (cince February 2017)

== Other museums of the City Museum ==
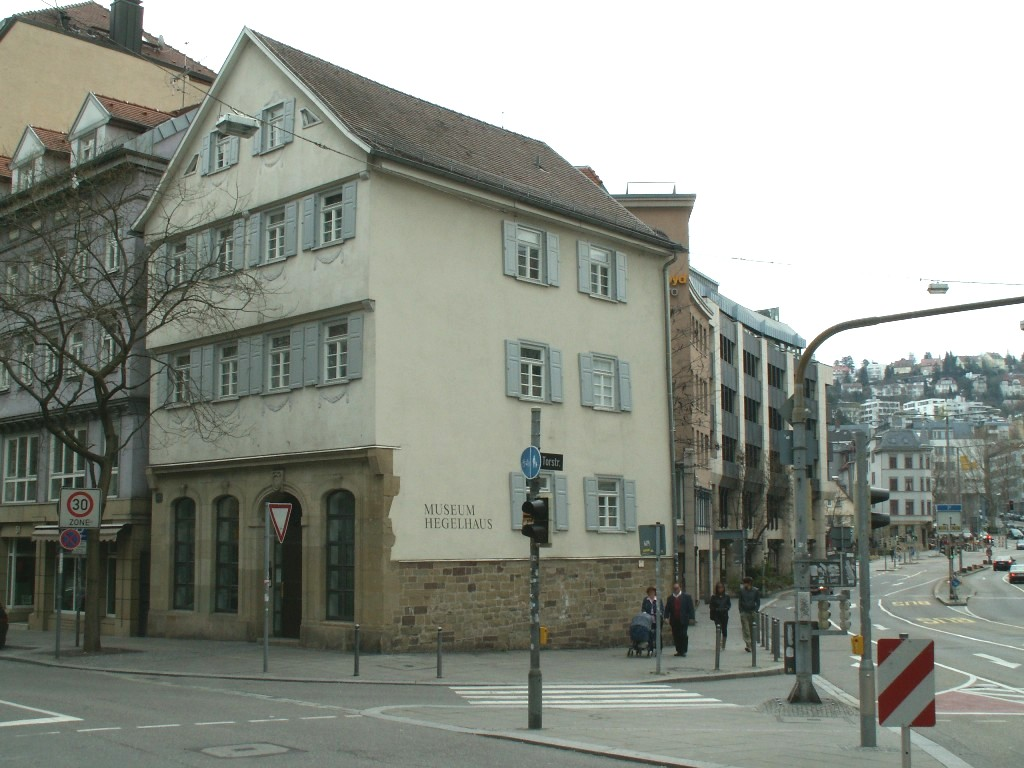
Hegel House

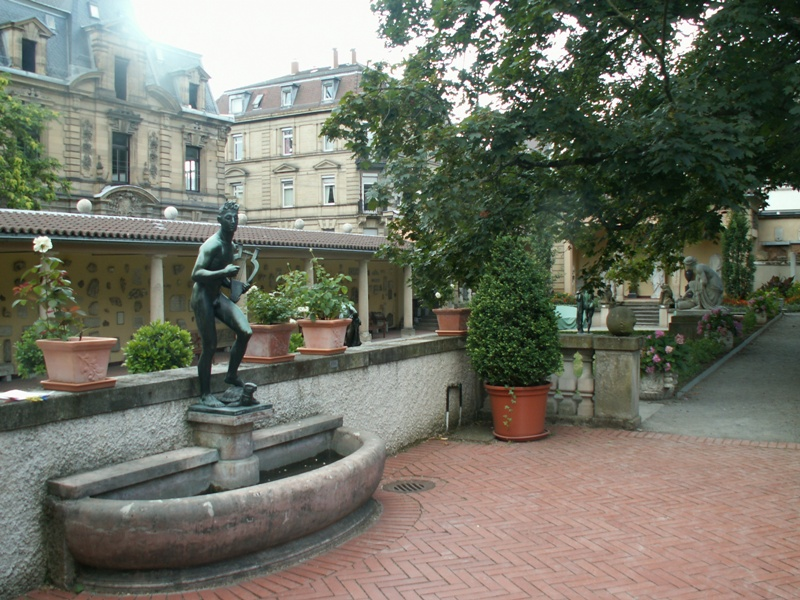
Stuttgart City Lapidarium

The following museums in Stuttgart also belong to the Stuttgart City Museum:

- Hegel House
- Bad Cannstatt City Museum
- City Lapidarium
- Local History Museum Möhringen
- Local History Museum Plieningen
