= Album amicorum =

Early form of the poetry, autograph or friendship book

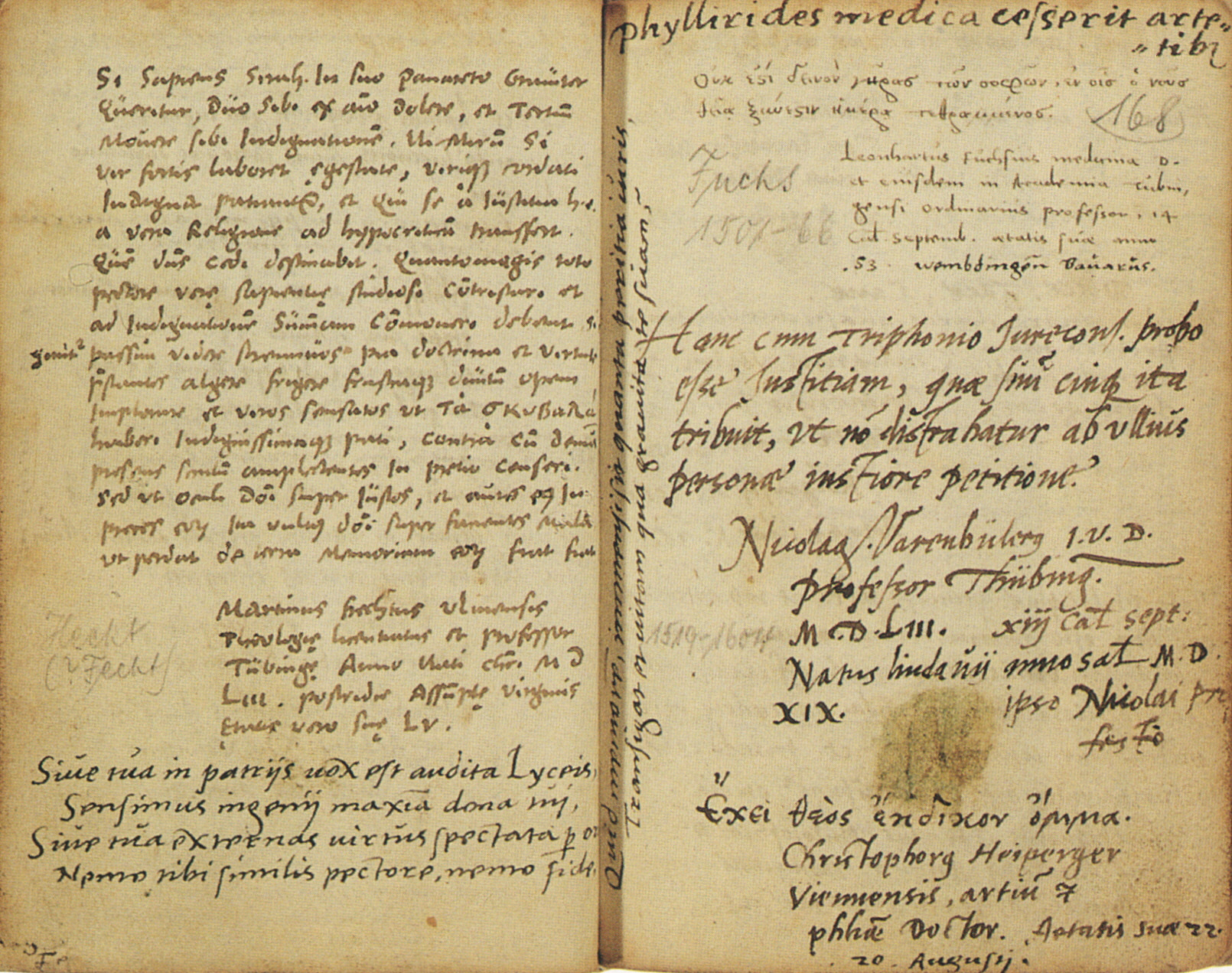
Double page with inscriptions from August 1553 in the friendship book owned by Johann Valentin Deyger

The album amicorum ('album of friends', friendship book) was an early form of the poetry book, the autograph book and the modern friendship book. It emerged during the Reformation period, during which it was popular to collect autographs from noted reformers. In the 1700s, the trend of the friendship book was still mainly limited to the Protestant people, as opposed to the Catholics. These books were particularly popular with university students into the early decades of the 19th century. Noteworthy are the pre-printed pages of a friendship book (Stammbuchblatt) from 1770 onwards, published as a loose-leaf collection by the bookbinder and pressman Johannes Carl Wiederhold (1743-1826) from Göttingen.

== Application ==
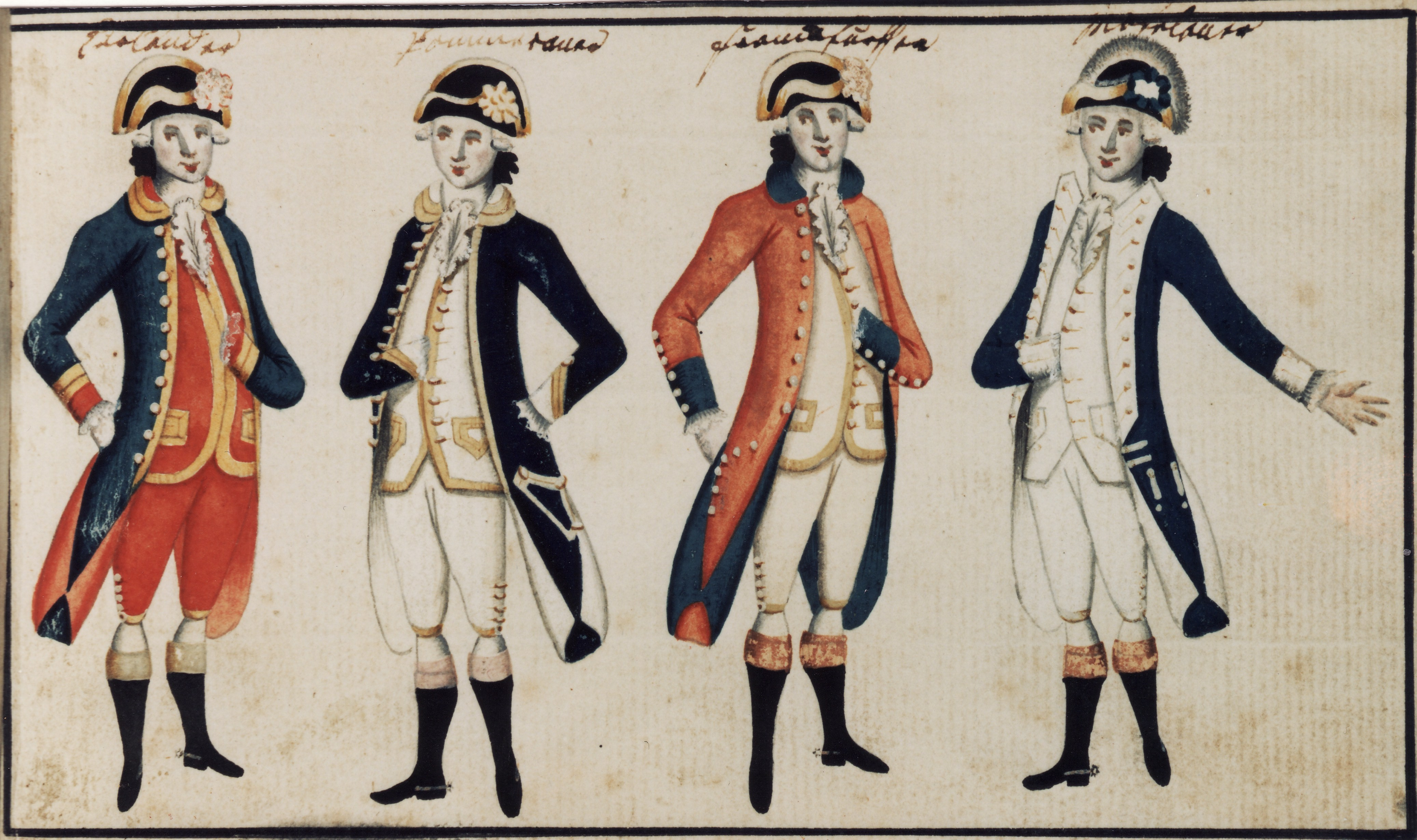
Illustrations from the friendship book of Rupstein (1773)

In a friendship book, two or more people vowed each other their friendship through filling out a page in the other person's album. This usually took place during special occasions, like festivities or on the departure from one's place of study. The entry could then be renewed during reunions or on the occasion of another festivity. Therefore, the friendship book created the opportunity to have a lifelong memory of the book-owners childhood friends. Apart from that, the friendship books constituted a collection of autographs from professors (Cf. student scene in "Faust") and from other respected people like priests, aristocrats and prominent figures, since the books often served as letters of recommendation for students switching universities. Through asking a person of a higher rank to sign one's friendship book, the opportunity to reel in potential patrons and protectors for the holder also opened up.

== Content and meaning ==
In its full form an entry would have a personal note, such as a handwritten greeting, a poem (of one's own composition) or other small literary texts. Poems that were titled To * (*replaces the name of the owner) were usually meant to be for a friendship book.

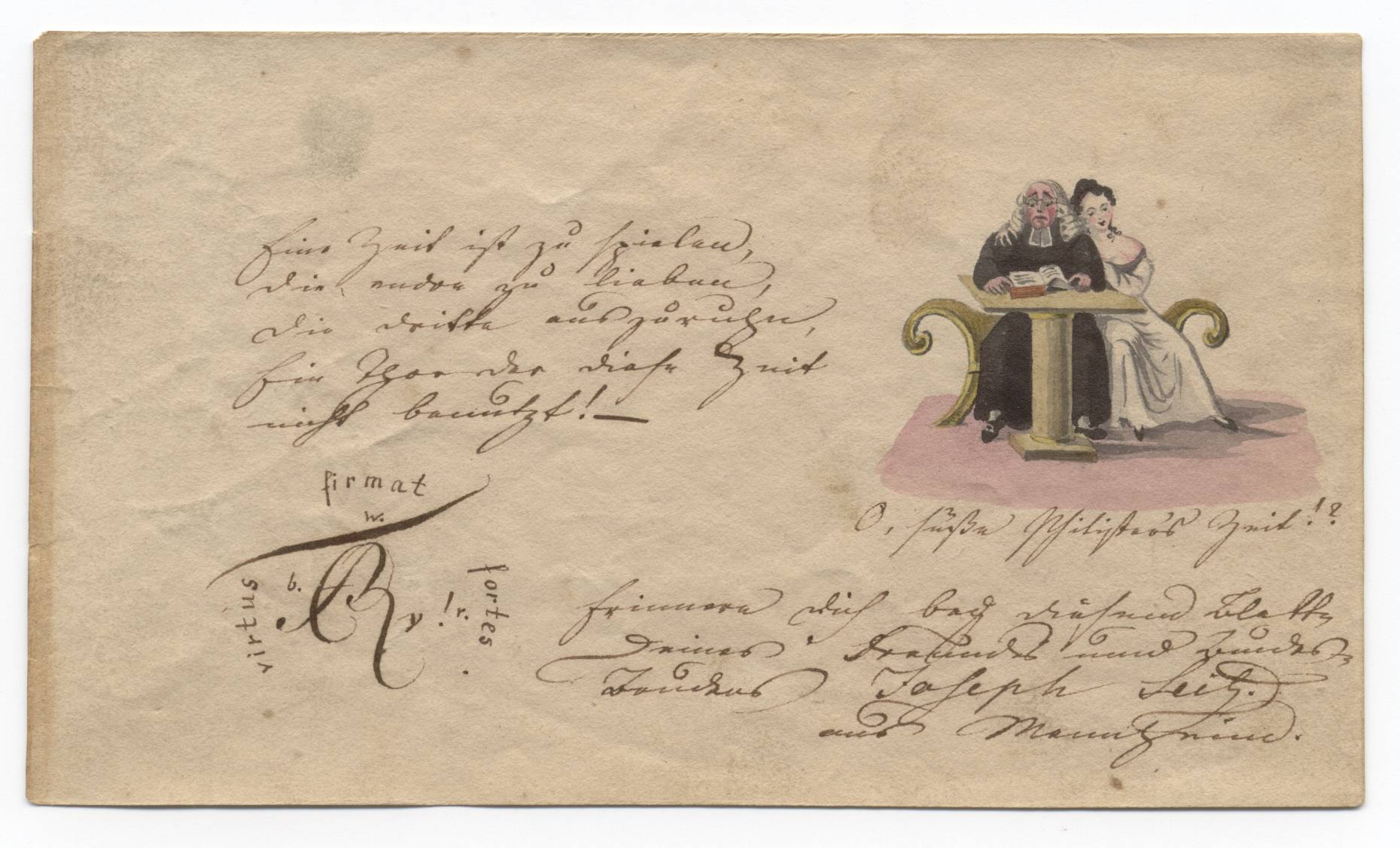
Colored friendship book sheet Rhenania II, Heidelberg, 1822

Ideally, the person writing the entry mentions the date and place next to their personal note or poem. The designed page usually contained a life motto written as a symbolum (line or quote). Signing the page created is essential. Moreover, this signature did not only contain the authors name, but also the faculty where they studied and where they came from is written down. Additionally, right before the name of the person who wrote the entry, a Dedikationsformel (a set phrase to state that this page is a dedication to the owner of the book) was included. This Dedikationsformel was used to ask the owner to memorize the author (memoriae causa scripsi ... engl. "while reading those lines think of ... "). This style is still up to date in autograph books of (primarily) young girls.

More artistic authors sketched colourful pen and ink drawings. With not everyone being artistically skilled, a new market was created in the 18th century. Pre-designed friendship book sheets were sold, which could be filled in with individual information. Sheets displaying pictures of Universities or images related to the students everyday life were highly popular designs for friendship books.

The entry topics emerged from the student's shared experience of university life. The various forms of students' unions that were common in the respective centuries were reflected in those book sheets. The friendship book sheets are an important historical source for the history of the university as the students' unions were oftentimes banned until 1848. There is only very little written records, especially about the student orders from the second half of the 18th century. In such cases, the mostly personal entries on the album sheets often represent the only source. For reasons of confidentiality, the students invented a variety of cryptographic elements through which they confirmed their belonging to the order without anyone being able to prove it. The union's identity symbols emerged from those cryptographic elements that are still partially used by the students' unions today. The circle or the federal symbol for example, occur in every student coat of arms.

Album Amicorum belonging to Michael Van Meer

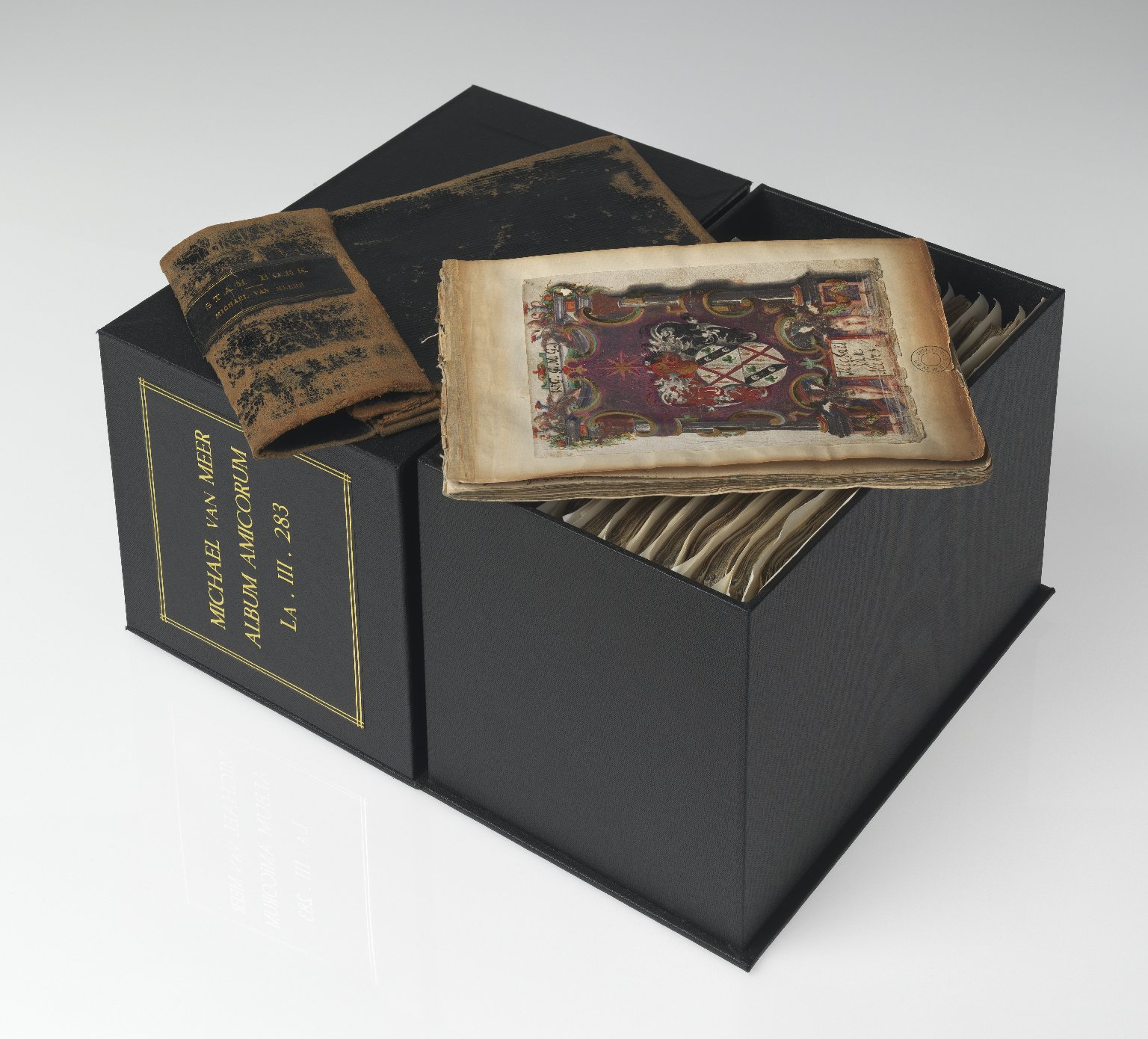
File:Bound_collection_of_Albums_Amicorum_belonging_to_Michael_van_Meer.jpg

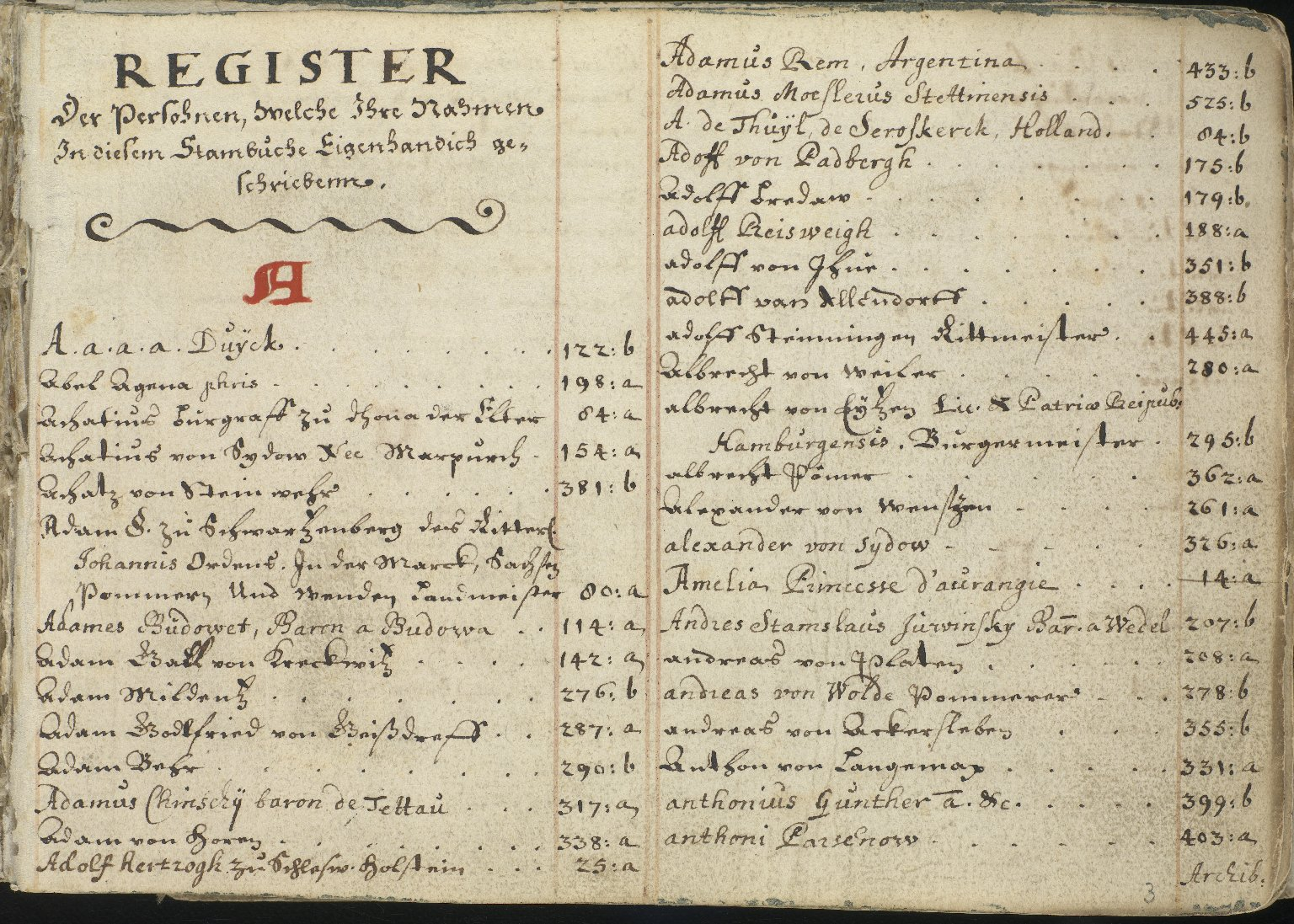
File:Page_one_of_the_register_of_autographs_collected_by_Michael_Van_Meer.jpg

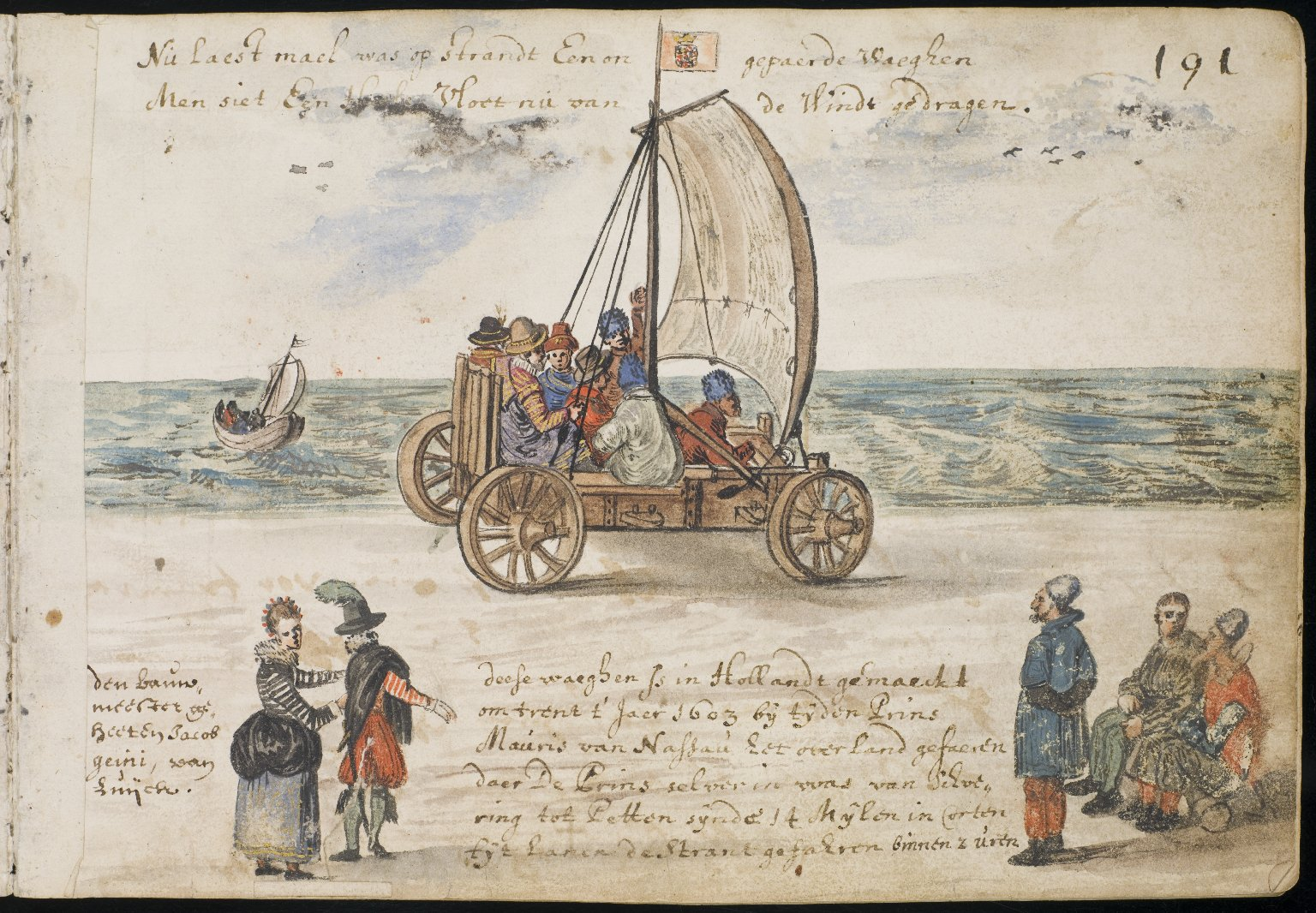
File:One_of_the_earliest_depictions_of_land_wind-surfing._From_the_album_amicorum_of_Michael_van_Meer.jpg

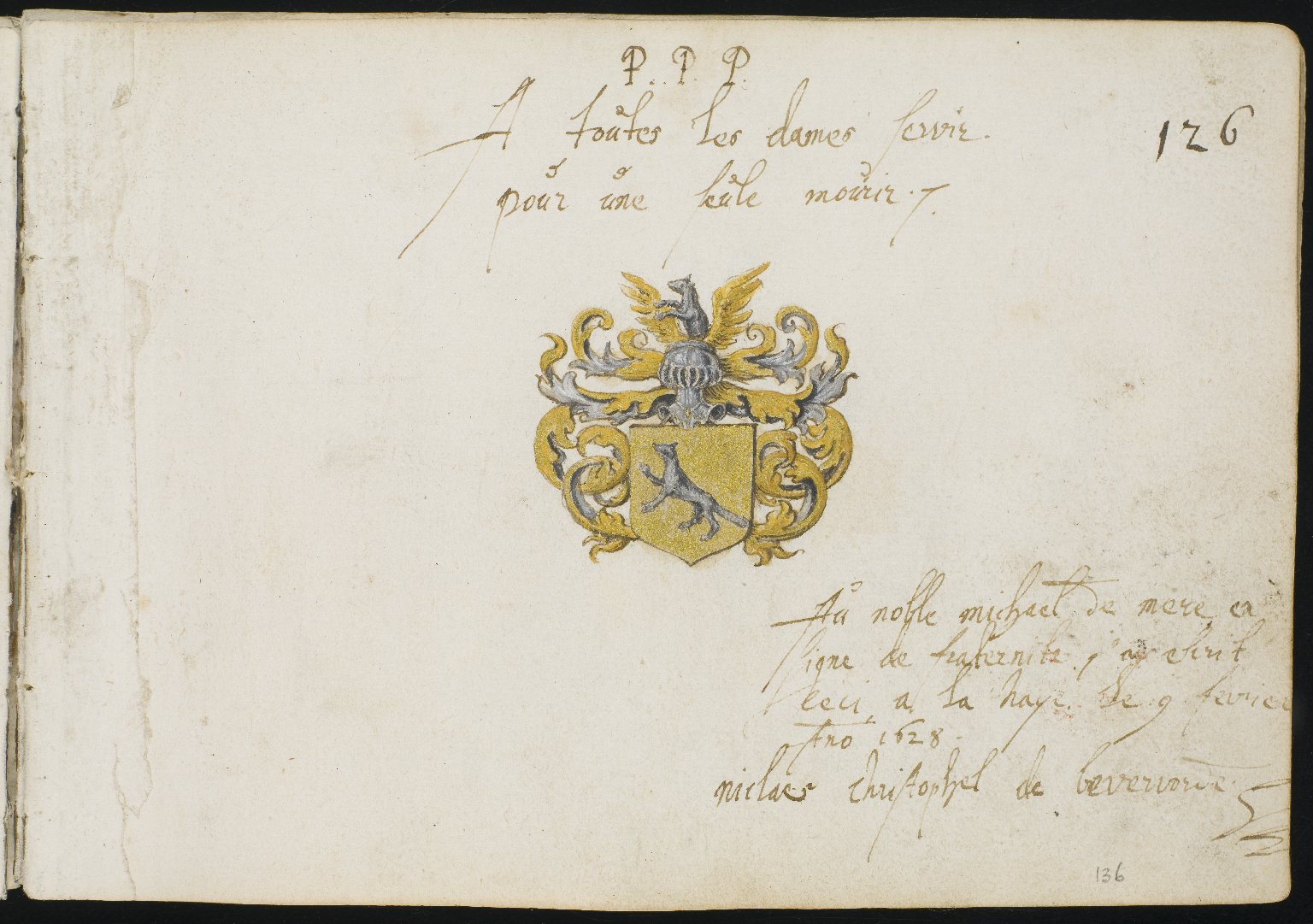
File:Coat_of_arms._From_the_album_amicorum_of_Michael_Van_Meer.jpg

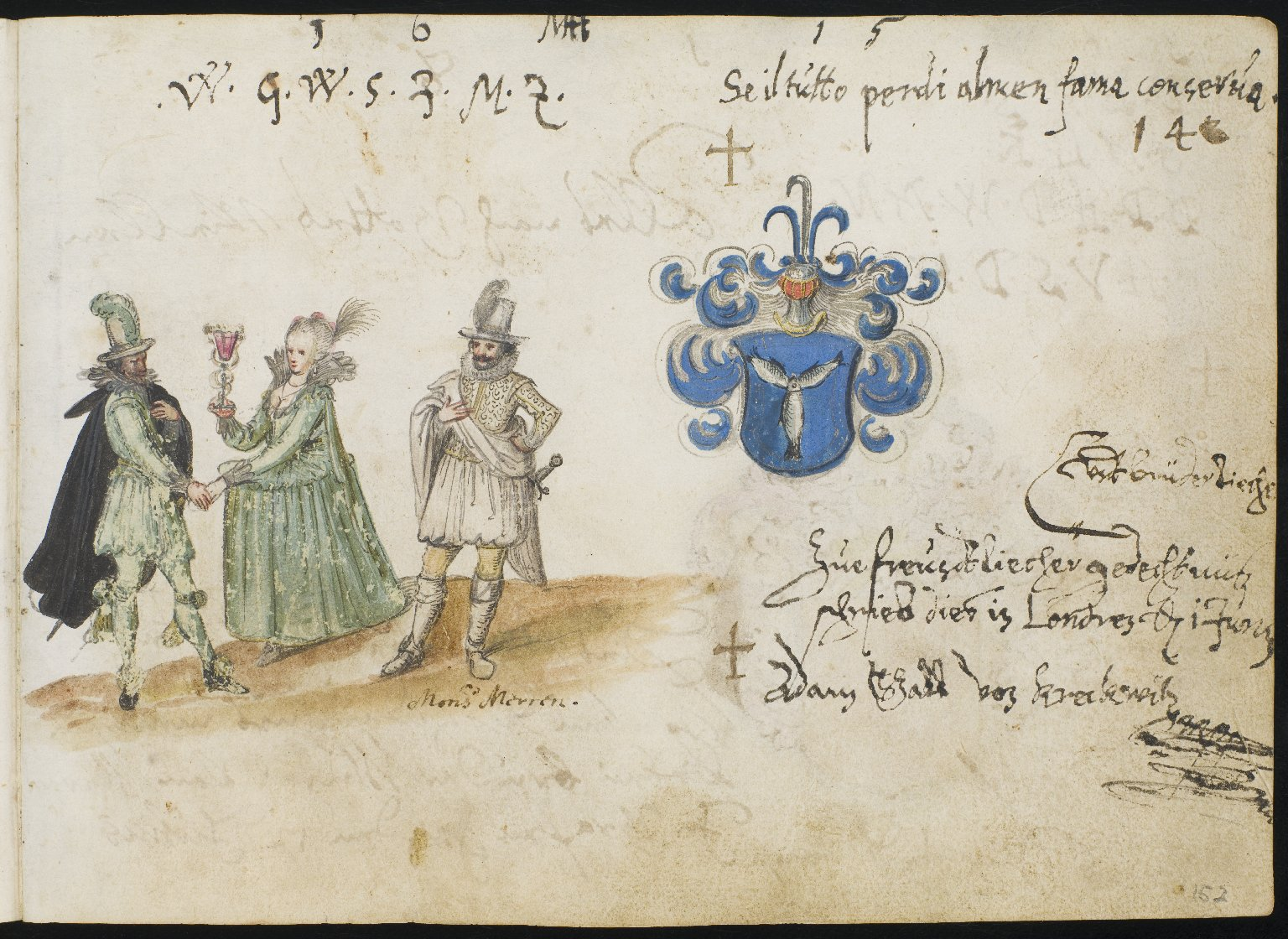
File:Coat_of_arms,_and_associated_illustration._From_the_album_amicorum_of_Michael_Van_Meer.jpg

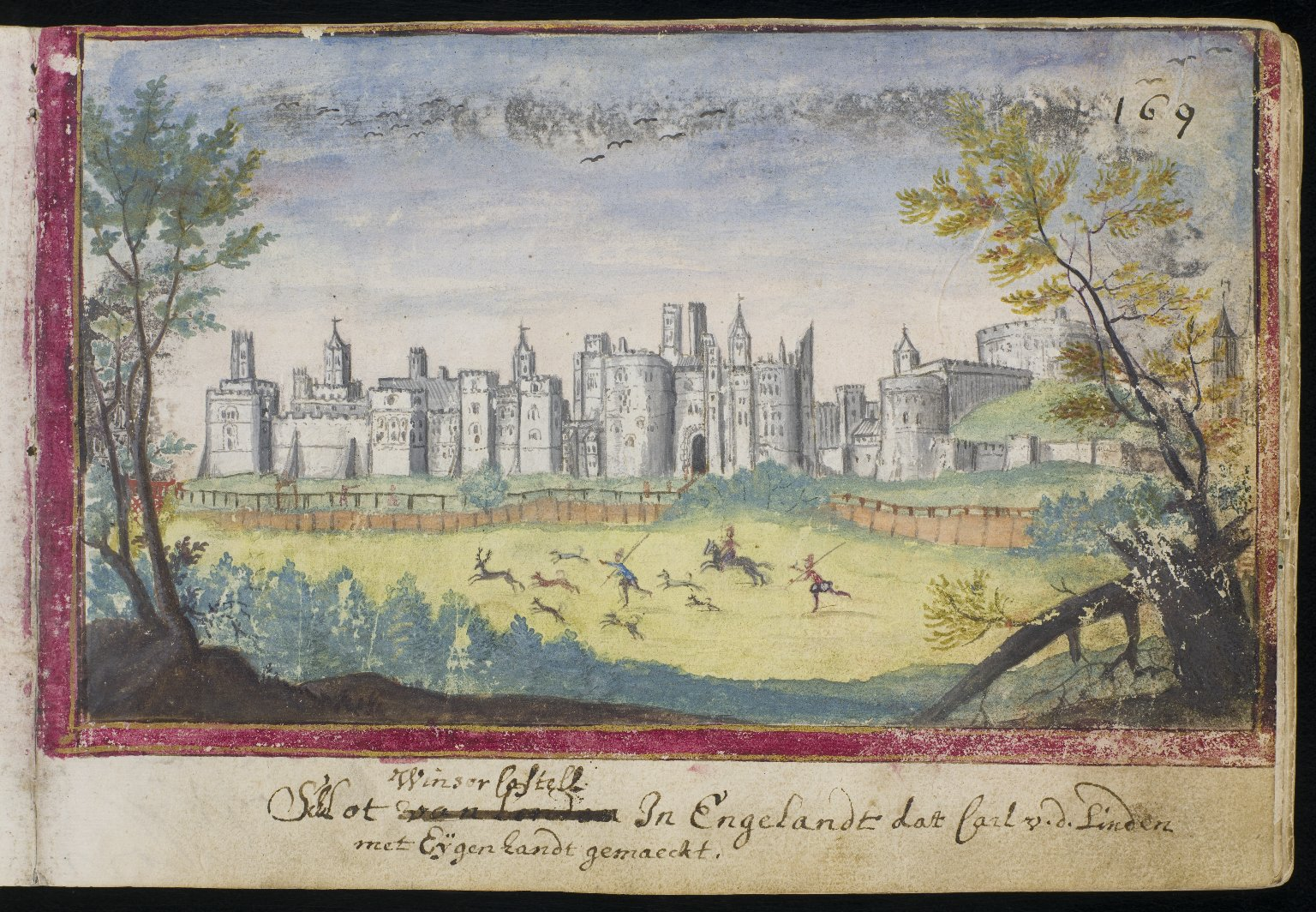
File:Illustration_of_Windsor_Castle,_England._From_the_album_amicorum_of_Michael_Van_Meer.jpg

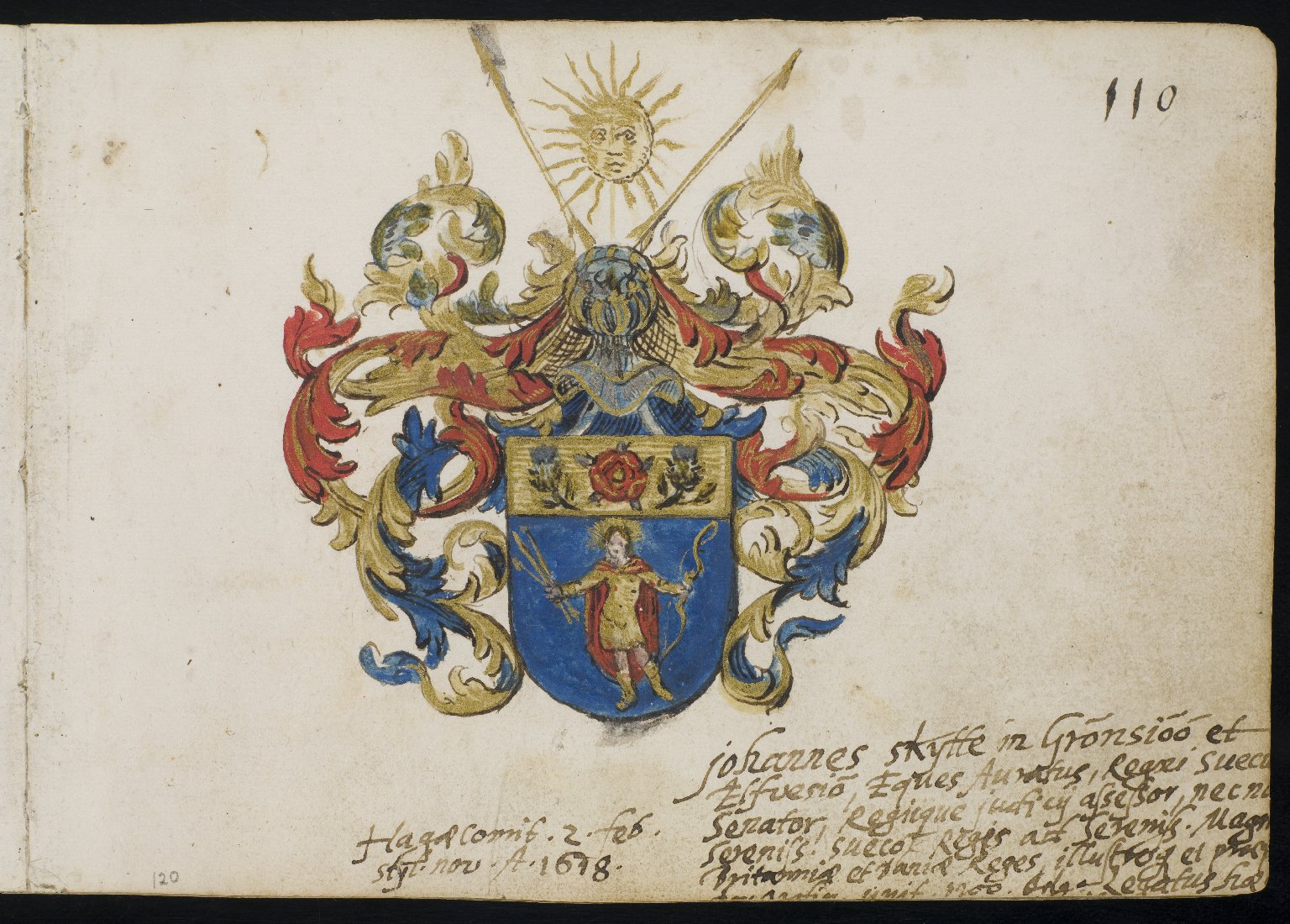
File:Coat_of_arms_of_Johan_Skytte._From_the_album_amicorum_of_Michael_Van_Meer.jpg

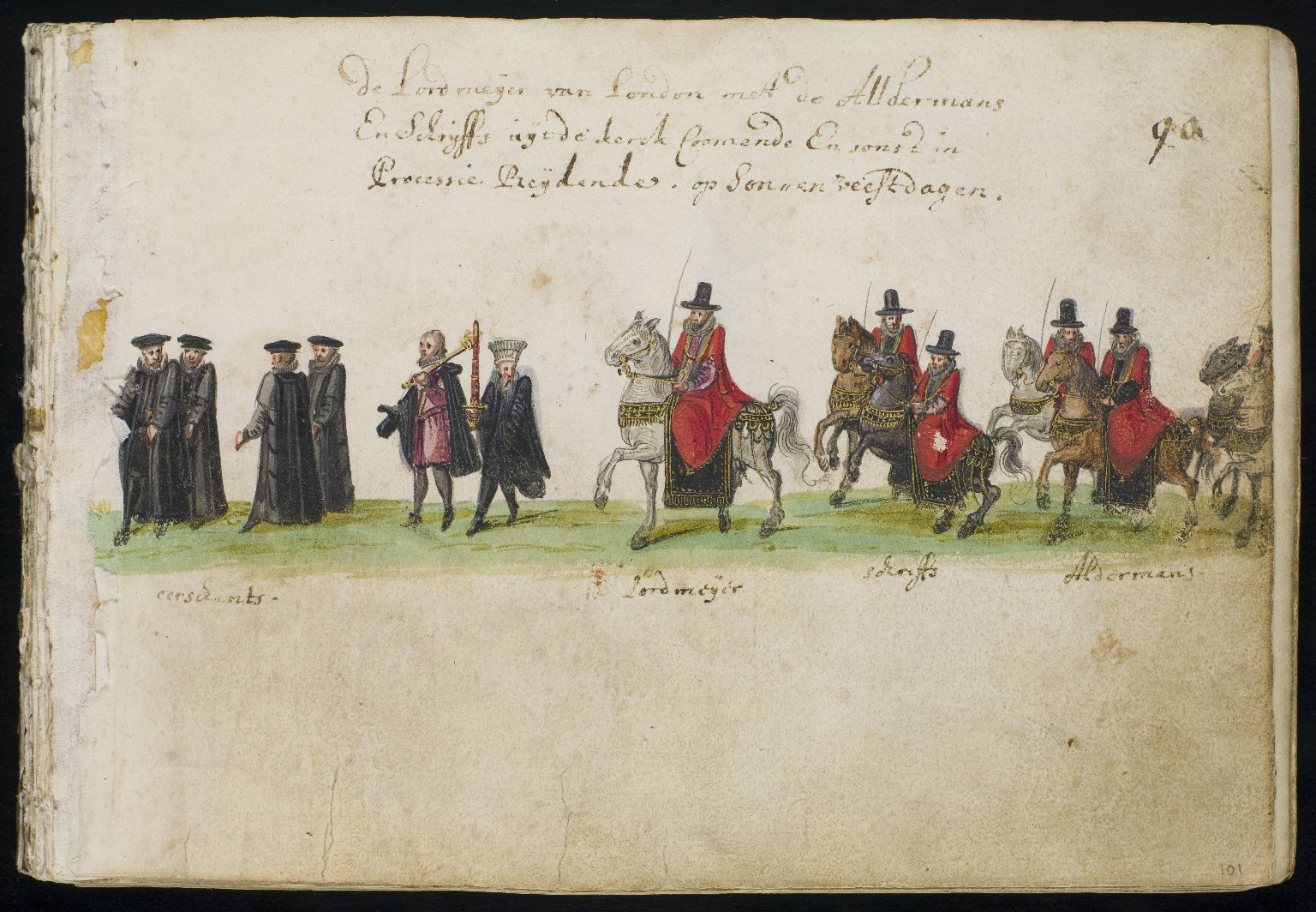
File:Illustration_of_the_Lord_Mayor_of_London_in_procession._Part_of_the_Album_amicorum_of_Michael_Van_Meer.jpg

== See also ==
- friendship book
- autograph book

== Literature ==
- Herzog August d. J. – Das Stammbuch (1592–1605). 10 Postkarten. Herzog August Bibliothek Wolfenbüttel [Betr. Tübingen], o. J.
- Robert Keil, Richard Keil: Die Deutschen Stammbücher des sechzehnten bis neunzehnten Jahrhunderts. Ernst und Scherz, Weisheit und Schwank in Original-Mittheilungen zur deutschen Kultur-Geschichte. Grote, Berlin 1893, (Digitalisat).
- Walter Blankenburg, Fritz Lometsch: Denkmal der Freundschaft. Studenten-Stammbücher 1790–1840 (= Druck der Arche.) 60, ZDB-ID 844773-1. Lometsch, Kassel 1969.
- Lotte Kurras: Zu gutem Gedenken. Kulturhistorische Miniaturen aus Stammbüchern des Germanischen Nationalmuseums. 1550–1770. Prestel, München 1987, ISBN 3-7913-0827-0.
- Hans Günther Bickert, Norbert Nail: Liebenswertes Lahn-Athen. Das 300jährige Jubelfest der Philipps-Universität. Die erste Ehrenpromotion einer Frau. Ein Blick in Marburger Stammbücher (= Schriften der Universitätsbibliothek Marburg. 65). Universitätsbibliothek Marburg, Marburg 1992, ISBN 3-8185-0123-8.
- Christine Göhmann-Lehmann: "Freundschaft – ein Leben lang …" Schriftliche Erinnerungskultur für Frauen. Museumsdorf Cloppenburg, Cloppenburg 1994, ISBN 3-923675-36-4 (Ausstellungskatalog).
- Norbert Nail: "Semper lustig. Nunquam traurig." Marburger Studenten im Stammbuch des Conrad Westermayr. In: Alma mater philippina. Sommersemester 1994, ISSN 0569-082X, S. 22–25, (Illustriert).
- Horst Steinhilber: Von der Tugend zur Freiheit. Studentische Mentalitäten an deutschen Universitäten 1740–1800 (= Historische Texte und Studien. 14). Olms, Hildesheim u. a. 1995, ISBN 3-487-10028-2 (Zugleich: Stuttgart, Universität, Dissertation, 1994).
- Werner Taegert: Edler Schatz holden Erinnerns. Bilder in Stammbüchern der Staatsbibliothek Bamberg aus vier Jahrhunderten. Staatsbibliothek Bamberg, Bamberg 1995, ISBN 3-924530-08-4.
- Rolf Wilhelm Brednich: Denkmale der Freundschaft. Die Göttinger Stammbuchkupfer – Quellen der Kulturgeschichte. Bremer, Friedland 1997, ISBN 3-9803783-1-4.
- Walter M. Brod: Aus einem fränkischen Stammbuch – Bütthard und Umgebung. Stammbuchblätter aus der Studienzeit des Michael Joseph Weber, Würzburg. 1817–1822. Institut für Hochschulkunde, Würzburg 1997.
- Der Freundschaft Denkmal. Stammbücher und Poesiealben aus fünf Jahrhunderten. An exhibition in the Buchmuseum der SLUB, February 25 to June 27, 1998. Saxon State Library – Staats - und Universitätsbibliothek Dresden, Dresden 1998.
- Gilbert Heß: Literatur im Lebenszusammenhang. Text- und Bedeutungskonstituierung im Stammbuch Herzog Augusts des Jüngeren von Braunschweig-Lüneburg (1579–1666) (= Mikrokosmos. Beiträge zur Literaturwissenschaft und Bedeutungsforschung. 67). Lang, Frankfurt am Main u. a. 2002, ISBN 3-631-38070-4 (Zugleich: München, Ludwig-Maximilians-Universität, Dissertation, 2001).
- Rosemarie Schillemeit (Hrsg.): Das Stammbuch des Benedict Christian Avenarius. Zeugnisse eines Studenten- und Hofmeisterlebens in Göttingen, Braunschweig und im Leipzig des jungen Goethe. Mit Erläuterungen und einer Lebensbeschreibung (= Braunschweiger Beiträge zur deutschen Sprache und Literatur. 4). Verlag für Regionalgeschichte, Bielefeld u. a. 2002, ISBN 3-89534-344-7.
- Werner Wilhelm Schnabel: "Kurtz=Sinn=reiche Sprüche". Barocke Mustersammlungen für Albuminskriptionen. In: Morgen-Glantz. Zeitschrift der Christian-Knorr-von-Rosenroth-Gesellschaft. 12, 2002, ISSN 0942-0924, S. 101–133.
- Werner Wilhelm Schnabel: Das Stammbuch. Konstitution und Geschichte einer textsortenbezogenen Sammelform bis ins erste Drittel des 18. Jahrhunderts (= Frühe Neuzeit. 78). Niemeyer, Tübingen 2003, ISBN 3-484-36578-1 (Zugleich: Erlangen-Nürnberg, Universität, Habilitations-Schrift, 2000).
- Stammbuch des Johann Bernhard Wilhelm Sternberger aus Meiningen, seit 1773 Student der Rechte in Jena. Jena, Thüringer Universitäts- und Landesbibliothek, Stb. 90. Faksimile. 2 Bände (Faksimile-Bd. Kommentar-Bd. von Joachim Ott). Friedrich-Schiller-Universität Jena u. a., Jena 2004, ISBN 3-9809040-9-1.
- Ulrich Rasche: Cornelius relegatus in Stichen und Stammbuchbildern des frühen 17. Jahrhunderts. Zur Memoria studentischer Standeskultur in deren Formationsphase. In: 450 Jahre Universität Jena (= Einst und Jetzt. 53). Schmidt, Neustadt an der Aisch 2008, ISBN 978-3-87707-717-7, S. 15–47.
- Volker Schäfer: Das Stammbuch des Tübinger Stiftlers August Faber mit seinem Hölderlin-Eintrag von 1789. In: Sönke Lorenz, Volker Schäfer (Hrsg.): Tubingensia. Impulse zur Stadt- und Universitätsgeschichte. Festschrift für Wilfried Setzler zum 65. Geburtstag (= Tübinger Bausteine zur Landesgeschichte. 10). Jan Thorbecke, Ostfildern 2008, ISBN 978-3-7995-5510-4, S. 397–426.
- Nicole Domka/Eva Raffel/Gerd Brinkhus (Hrsg.): In ewiger Freundschaft. Stammbücher aus Weimar und Tübingen, Kulturamt der Univ.-Stadt, Tübingen 2009 (Tübinger Kataloge, Band 83), ISBN 978-3-910090-92-7.
- Werner Wilhelm Schnabel: Selbstinszenierung in Texten und Bildern. Stammbücher und Stammbucheinträge aus Helmstedt. In: Jens Bruning, Ulrike Gleixner(Hrsg.): Das Athen der Welfen. Die Reformuniversität Helmstedt 1576–1810 (= Ausstellungskataloge der Herzog-August-Bibliothek. 92). Harrassowitz, Wiesbaden 2010, ISBN 978-3-447-06210-7, S. 68–77.
- Werner Wilhelm Schnabel: Stammbücher. In: Ulrich Rasche (Hrsg.): Quellen zur frühneuzeitlichen Universitätsgeschichte. Typen, Bestände, Forschungsperspektiven (= Wolfenbütteler Forschungen. 128). Harrassowitz, Wiesbaden 2011, ISBN 978-3-447-06604-4, S. 421–452.
- Ralf-Torsten Speler (Hrsg.): Vivat Academia, Vivant Professores! Hallesches Studentenleben im 18. Jahrhundert (= Martin-Luther-Universität Halle-Wittenberg. Katalog des Universitätsmuseums der Zentralen Kustodie. NF 7). Martin-Luther-Universität Halle-Wittenberg – Zentrale Kustodie und Universitätsmuseum, Halle 2011, ISBN 978-3-86829-348-7.
- Eva Raffel: Goethe, Galilei und Co. Freundschaftsbücher der Herzogin Anna Amalia Bibliothek, Meissner, Berlin 2012, ISBN 978-3-87527-120-1.
- Ferdinand Ahuis, Walther Ludwig (Hrsg.): Das Album Reformatorum Cygnaeum (1542/1543) in der Prachtbibel des Zwickauer Bürgermeisters Oswald Lasan. Mit einer Einleitung von Ferdinand Ahuis. Hauswedell, Stuttgart 2013, ISBN 978-3-7762-0513-8.
- Jan-Andrea Bernhard: Das Album Amicorum von Ursula Staehelin aus St. Gallen. Ein Beitrag zur Peregrinations- und Kommunikationsgeschichte. In: Schriften des Vereins für Geschichte des Bodensees und seiner Umgebung. Bd. 131, 2013, ISSN 0342-2070, S. 185–197.
- David Paisey: A German student's album in the British Library. Lauingen, Wittenberg and Tübingen, 1580–1588. In: William A. Kelly, Jürgen Beyer (Hrsg.): The German book in Wolfenbüttel and abroad. Studies presented to Ulrich Kopp in his retirement (= Studies in reading and book culture. 1). University of Tartu Press, Tartu 2014, ISBN 978-9949-32-494-1, S. 261–278.
- Werner Wilhelm Schnabel: Das Album Amicorum. Ein gemischtmediales Sammelmedium und einige seiner Variationsformen. In: Anke Kramer, Annegret Pelz (Hrsg.): Album. Organisationsform narrativer Kohärenz. Wallstein, Göttingen 2013, ISBN 978-3-8353-1174-9, S. 213–239, (open access: FWF-E-Book-Library: https://e-book.fwf.ac.at/o:340).
- Margarete Zimmermann, Stephanie Bung: Salonalben. Kollektive Gedächtniswerke der Frühen Neuzeit mit einem Exkurs zu 'La Guirlande de Julie. In: Anke Kramer, Annegret Pelz (Hrsg.): Album. Organisationsform narrativer Kohärenz. Wallstein, Göttingen 2013, ISBN 978-3-8353-1174-9, S. 254–270, (open access: FWF-E-Book-Library: https://e-book.fwf.ac.at/o:340).
- Georg Objartel: Memorabilien in Studenten-Stammbüchern. In: Georg Objartel: Sprache und Lebensform deutscher Studenten im 18. und 19. Jahrhundert. Aufsätze und Dokumente (= Studia Linguistica Germanica. 123). De Gruyter, Berlin u a. 2016, ISBN 978-3-11-045399-7, S. 105–126.
- Peter Hartwig Graepel: Pharmaziehistorisch relevante Stammbücher. Autographen deutscher Apotheker. Miniaturen mit Apothekenansichten und pharmazeutischen Tätigkeiten (= Gladenbacher Beiträge zur Geschichte des deutschen Apothekenwesens. 3). Peter Hartwig Graepel, Gladenbach 2016, ISBN 978-3-00-050342-9.
