= Autograph book =

Album for collecting autographs

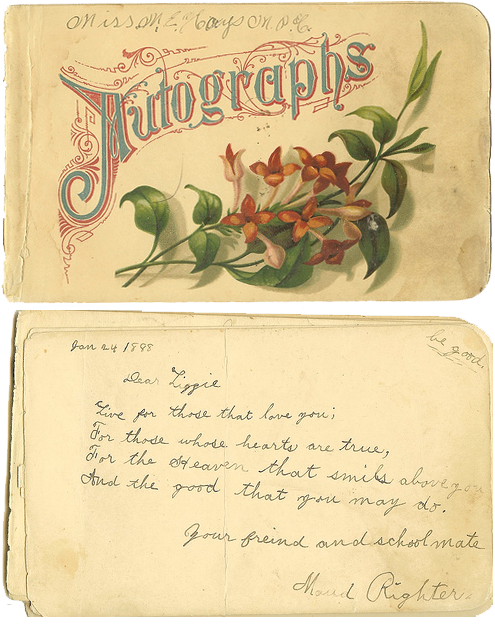
1888 autograph book

An autograph book (also known as an autograph album, a memory album or friendship album) is a book for collecting the autographs of others. Traditionally they were exchanged among friends, colleagues, and classmates to fill with poems, drawings, personal messages, small pieces of verse, and other mementos. Their modern derivations include yearbooks, friendship books, and guest books. They were popular among university students from the 15th century until the mid-19th century, after which their popularity began to wane as they were gradually replaced by yearbooks.

== History ==
=== Origin ===
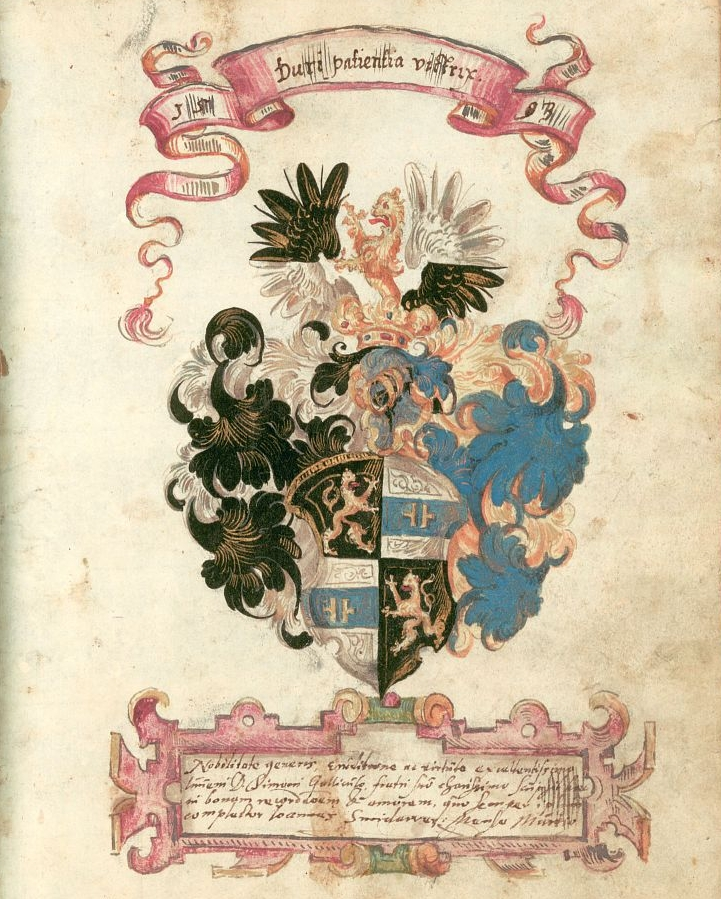
This page from the autograph book of Simon Haendel (compiled in the 1590s) features a personal greeting, written in Latin adde

By the beginning of the early modern period, there was a trend among graduating university students of central Europe to have their personal bibles signed by classmates and instructors. Gradually these expanded from mere signatures to include poetry and sketches, and publication companies responded to this trend by appending blank pages to bibles. Eventually they began offering small, decorated books with only blank pages.

Other traditions dating back to the Middle Ages played into the development of the autograph book. Genealogical tables and guides circulated within aristocratic families, with each person adding his or her own information. Similarly, tournament participators would record their names, coats-of-arms, and possibly mottoes into tournament books.

The first true autograph books appeared in German and Dutch linguistic regions (possibly originating in Wittenberg) by the mid-16th century.

Known as an album amicorum ("book of friends") or stammbuch ("friendship book"), the oldest on record is that of Claude de Senarclens, an associate of John Calvin, and dates back to 1545. By the end of the century, they were common throughout Germany among students and scholars. Academics tended to retain their autograph books for many years and gather the correspondence of fellow intellectuals with whom they associated; therefore the books began to function not only as sentimental artifacts but also as a crude form of scholarly credentials, a precursor to the modern "list of references".

=== Evolution ===
The popularity of autograph books was generally confined to Dutch and Germanic cultures, and they appeared only sporadically in other countries. They began to fall out of favor in the academic community by the late 17th century, but rebounded a century later as they came into use among fraternity students and members of the burgeoning middle class. This new wave of autograph curators included women as well as men.

German immigrants transported the tradition to American culture in the late 18th century, where their popularity peaked around the time of the Civil War. Thereafter the use of autograph books declined sharply in both cultures as they were replaced by school yearbooks, though they remained a lingering fad among young women for some time. Autograph books in their classic form eventually disappeared from the landscape of American culture, but their usage endures among German schoolgirls, who know them as poesiealben. In Scandinavia, children called them minnebøker.

In the twentieth century, the average age of owners of autograph books dropped from mostly young adults to young teenagers and, by the second half of the century, to seven- and eight-year-olds. The poems and texts written in these books have been characterised as half literary and as folk literature. In an analysis of Norwegian children's albums during the Nazi occupation of WW2, Agnete Nesse demonstrates how the poems and illustrations the children wrote and drew in each other's autograph albums often expressed resistance to the occupation, for instance by using the colours of the Norwegian flag in their drawings or writing poems about Norwegian nature.

In June 1942, Anne Frank was gifted an autograph book and repurposed it as a personal journal that was posthumously published.

== Function ==
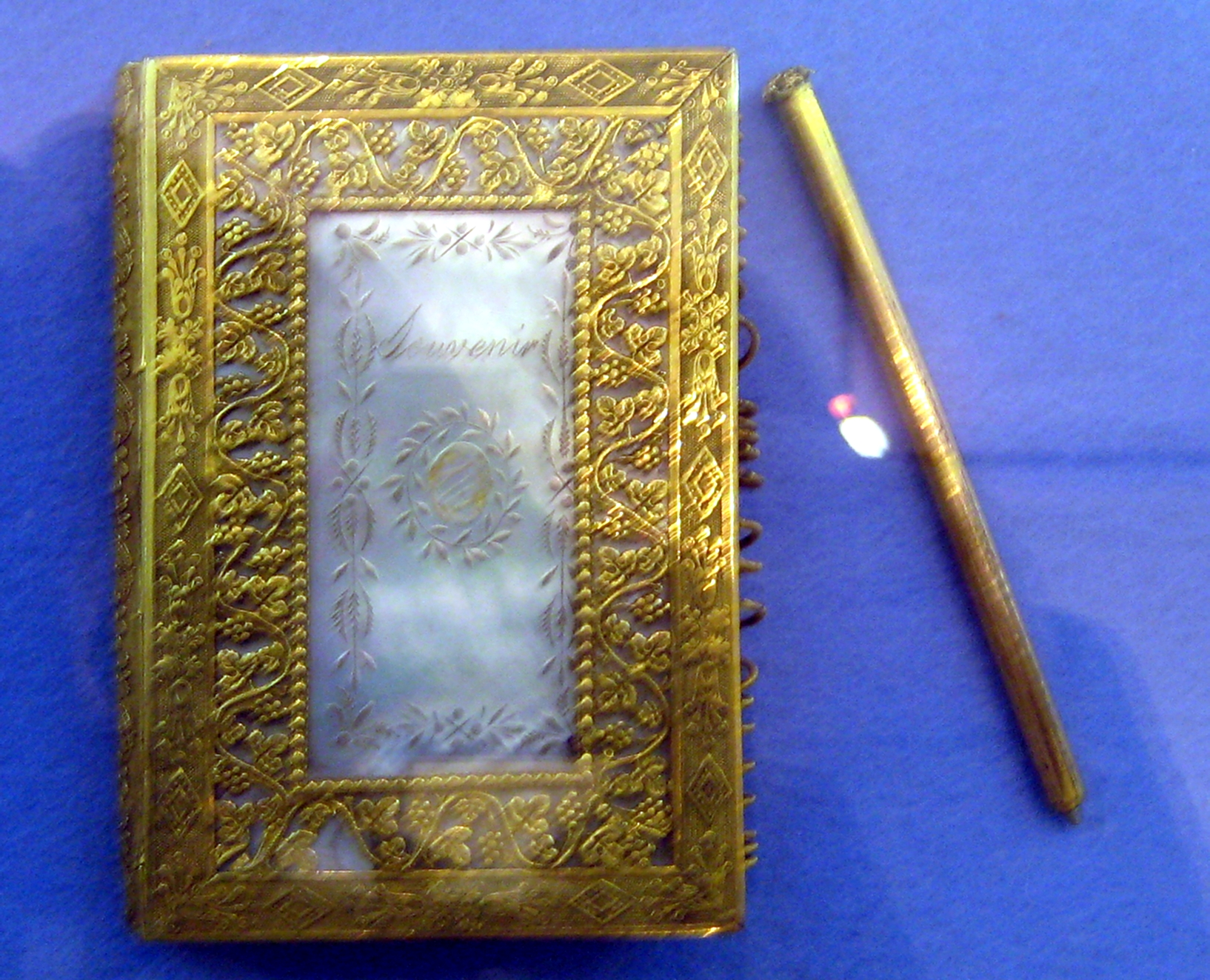
Small album, Russia, 1820-30s. Pushkin Museum, Moscow

When they first emerged in the 1500s, autograph books were used for collecting signatures at graduation and kept as a sentimental memento of college life. Eventually it became popular to use them well after graduation, and scholars would carry the books on their travels (particularly between various universities) to record the well-wishes of colleagues and noteworthy acquaintances. The books therefore conveyed a form of academic credentials, dependent upon who had signed them and what had been written.

Additionally, an autograph book may have been used as a crude address book to maintain correspondence to past and distant friends.

Recently, researchers have come to see the historical value of these books in assessing the biographical data of those who composed them and the cultural backdrop in which they wrote. The autograph books of Ludwig van Beethoven and Babette Koch are among the most famous.

== Design and format ==
=== Books ===
Until the late 18th century, German autograph albums generally consisted of loose sheets of paper or sometimes vellum bound in an elongated octavo format; later, they became available in the horizontal format. The binding material varied dramatically, from cardboard to gold-tooled leather.

A different type of album contained unbound pages in cassettes or folders, which could be passed out and collected individually and later arranged in any order.

=== Autographs ===
A typical page contained a set of verses in Latin, Greek, or Hebrew at the top, and a formal greeting to the album's owner below, sometimes including a heraldic shield or emblematic picture of the signator. More artistic autographers sketched full-page drawings, and less conventional entries included engravings, embroidery, paper silhouettes, locks of hair, or pressed flowers. The high quality of some illustrations suggests that the books must have been kept by the autographer for some length of time to work on the composition.
