= Friendship book =

Homemade booklet shared among pen pals

Friendship books (also known as "FBs" in their abbreviated form) are small booklets made by stapling paper together, or are sometimes just sheets or strips of paper. They are usually decorated and the person who starts the book writes their name and address as the first person sending the book. People also often include a list of interests. The FB is then passed around from penpal to penpal, and can often also become a way for one to meet new penpals. Most people hope to see the book again once it is full so they add their return address to the back cover of the book too, or inscribe "Return to Sender" on it. People also sometimes make FBs for someone else rather than themselves, in which case they write the name and address of the recipient on the front/at the top. Some people enjoy friendship books because they can see where the books have been in a trail back to the original sender/recipient.

The German friendship books (or poetry albums) serve a similar purpose but are kept, not sent away. Access is considered more intimate; sometimes the book even has a lock. The information given about oneself often includes quotations, poetry and worldly wisdom. Typically they are more like shared journals between two best friends or a couple and are kept at one of their houses.

Friendship books that require entrants to make drawings, use stickers or magazine photographs are known as "deco" friendship books or just simply "decos". Typically, each entrant in the "deco" must use one full page to express themselves. Glitter, sequins, feathers and other scrapbooking supplies are frequently used in "decos." Despite the artistic expressions used in these types of friendship books, the basic rules of passing the friendship book to person to person is the same.

When a 'friendship book' is only one page (no staples), it's called a 'friendship sheet.' If the page is small, like the size of a postcard, or smaller, it's called a 'cram.' Friendship books that have a musical theme, where you have to add lyrics to your entry, are called "lyrix" or "lyrics sheets".

== Slams ==
Slams are friendship books that include a theme of questions, either "Sign if you did/like the following", "What is your favorite" or other similar questions. These usually include one page as a "sign in", several pages of questions, and then a "sign out" or "shout out" page at the end. Slams can be themed or regular. Typically they are small like a standard friendship book. Often they have a "sign-in" page where you put your label or name, then each page will often contain a question which you answer (i.e. When was the last time you said "I love you") and the signer would write the appropriate response. At the end there is often a sign-out page as well where it's dated. Slams have many variations and can be "sign if" slams (you sign only if the statement or question applies to you). These are handled in a number of ways, but most of them become more clear when you have it in-hand.

== Crams ==
Crams are like friendship sheets or book, but no one includes any personal information. The idea (as the name implies) is to "cram" as many names and addresses into the provided space.

== Friendship sheet ==
As the name implies, friendship sheets are nearly the same as friendship books, but they are made on a single sheet of paper or stationery.

== Deco ==
Decos are similar to FBs, but are often larger in size. The cover is often decorated with interesting materials like magazine pictures, rubber stamps, decorative papers, and other embellishments. Each person who signs decorates a full page in the book. Sometimes the book has a theme, for example cats. Then, each person decorates their page following the theme. As with FBs, when these are full, they are sent home to the person for whom the book was made.

== Lyrix ==
Lyrix are much like decos except that each page is decorated using lyrics from a song. Some are more plain with the words simply written in them, others are as artistic as decos with pictures and other ornamental adornments.

== Quotes ==
Quotes are like Lyrics, but instead of song lyrics they contain quotes from movies. These can also be themed, such as Brad Pitt movie quotes. Quotes can be plain text or decorative.

== See also ==
- Pen pal
- Autograph book
