= Slavic paper cutting =

Slavic form of the art of papercutting

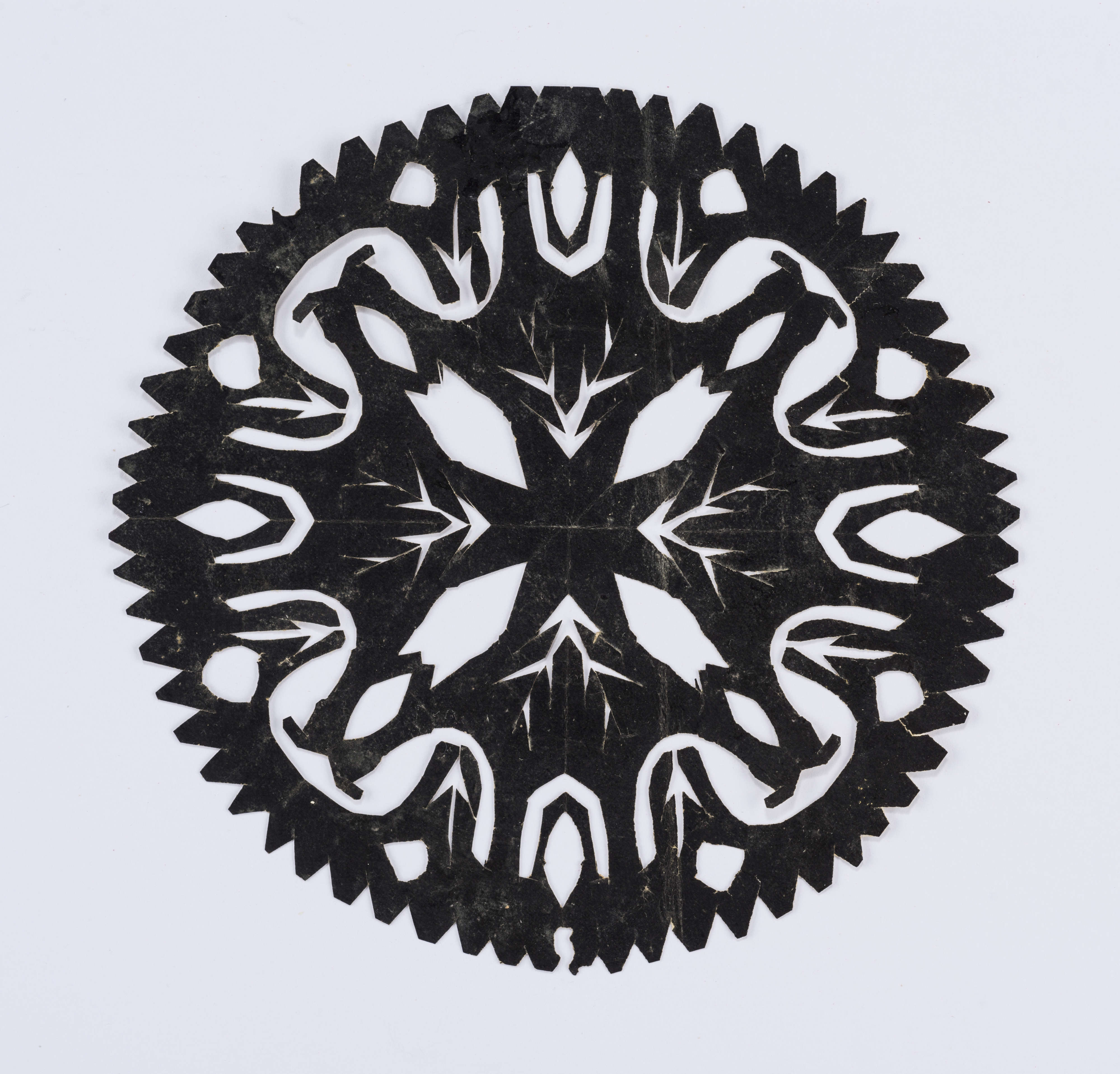
A wycinanka pattern from Lublin, 1915

Vytynanky (Витина́нки) in Ukraine or Wycinanki ([vɨt͡ɕiˈnaŋkʲi]) in Poland or Vycinanki (Выцінанкі) in Belarus, is a Slavic version of the art form of papercutting, popular in Belarus, Poland, and Ukraine.

== Belarus ==
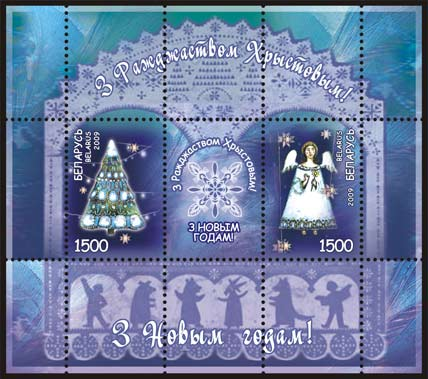
Postage stamp from Belarus inspired by Vytynanky

Vycinanka is also known as vyrazanka or vystryhanka. Viačaslaŭ Dubinka was a key figure in reviving the folk art of paper cutting in Belarus. Repeatedly the winner of international competitions, he left behind thousands of images with this technique. His works have adorned calendars, business cards, notepads, postcards and other items.

In 2024, an element "Vytsinanka, Traditional Art of Paper Cutting in Belarus" was inscribed on the UNESCO Representative List of the Intangible Cultural Heritage of Humanity.

== Poland ==
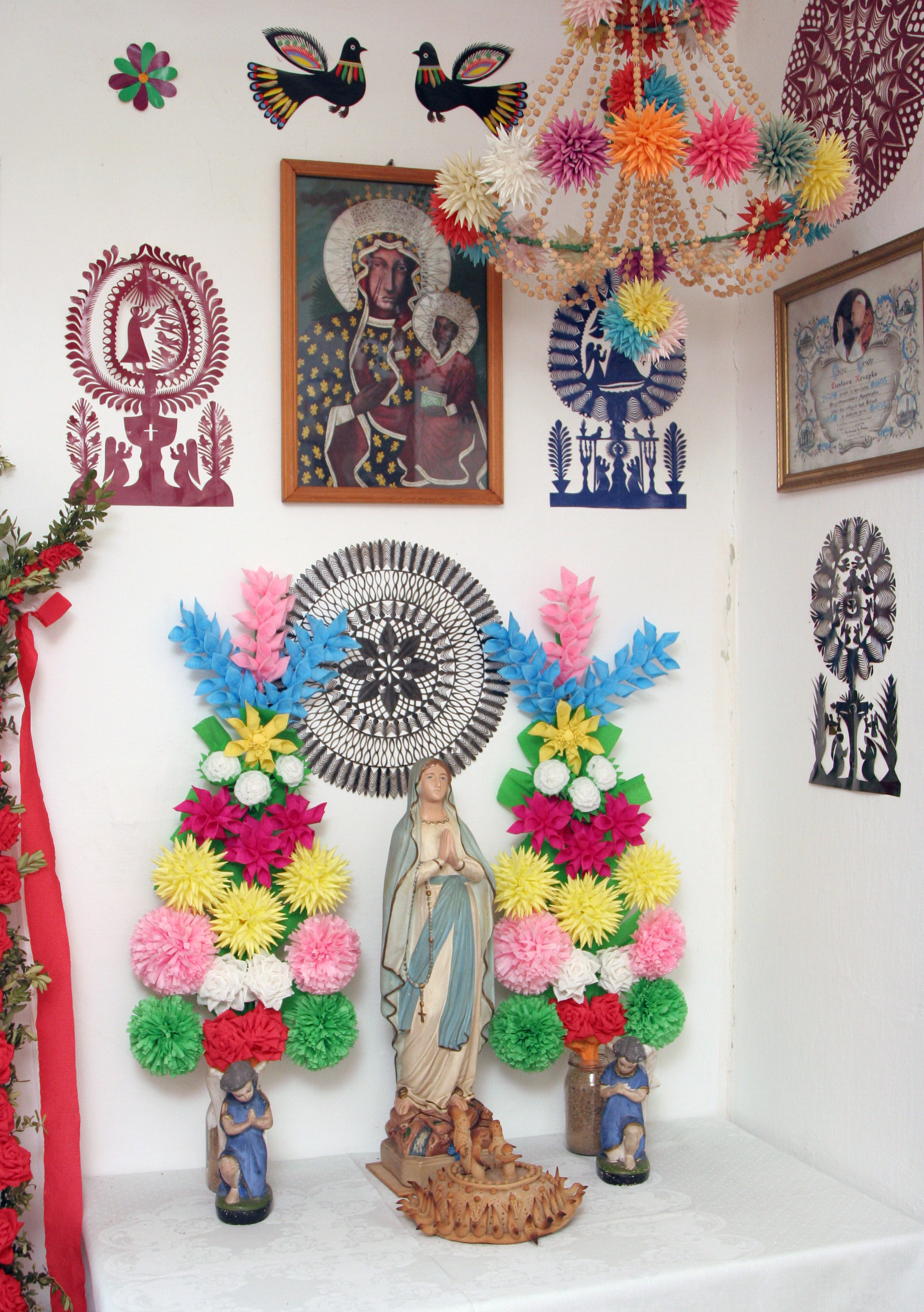
Wycinanki from Kurpie

Polish wycinanki became a popular folk craft in the mid-1800s.

Wycinanki originated with shepherds cutting designs out of tree bark and leather during inclement weather. Colorful wycinanki were pasted on furniture or roof beams as decoration, hung in windows, and given as gifts.

Wycinanki vary by region. For example, wycinanki created in the Kurpie region are typically all one color, while wycinanki from the Łowicz region are multicolored. Techniques include cutting, clipping, punching, tearing, and carving of paper, as well as nalepianki in which multiple layers are glued together.

Subject matter includes peacocks, roosters, and other birds; circular or star-shaped medallions (gwiazdy); flowers; and annual holidays such as Easter and Christmas. In some towns and villages competitions evolved to create the most beautiful wycinanki. Traditionally done for relaxation in rural Poland, the techniques were passed down through generations, with new themes and ideas developing as the papercuttings became more detailed and intricate.

The Polish Pavilion at the 2010 World Expo in Shanghai is based on a wycinanki design.

== Ukraine ==
Historical evidence suggests that vytynanky began to be made in Ukraine at the end of the fifteenth to early sixteenth century, but it took quite some time before they became an integral part of the decorative arts practiced at the grass roots level. During the nineteenth century decorative paper cutouts spread all across the Ukrainian countryside.

The word itself, vytynanky, gained currency in the early twentieth century, but there were many other, regional words that were used too—stryhuntsi, khrestyky or kvity to mention but a few. The vytynanky shapes were of many kinds and represented stylized figures of people, animals and plants. Ethnographers and art historians began to study the art of vytynanky, and artists began to seek inspiration for their art in vytynanky. Articles and essays were published, vytynanky began to be collected. Vytynanky were displayed at exhibitions of the Ukrainian decorative and applied arts alongside traditional pottery, embroidery, rugs and other items.

Vytynanky that were made for the occasions of religious feasts and holidays were more decorative than the ones used for everyday decoration. Christmas and Easter called for vytynanky in the shapes of angels, churches or even whole evangelical scenes to be pasted prominently on the walls. Marriages saw vytynanky in the shapes of doves, flowers, or the ones that formed "trees of life".

In modern day, vytynanky have been popularized as part of modern art and design by artists such as Daria Alyoshkina.
