= Young Poland =

1890–1918 modernist arts movement in Poland

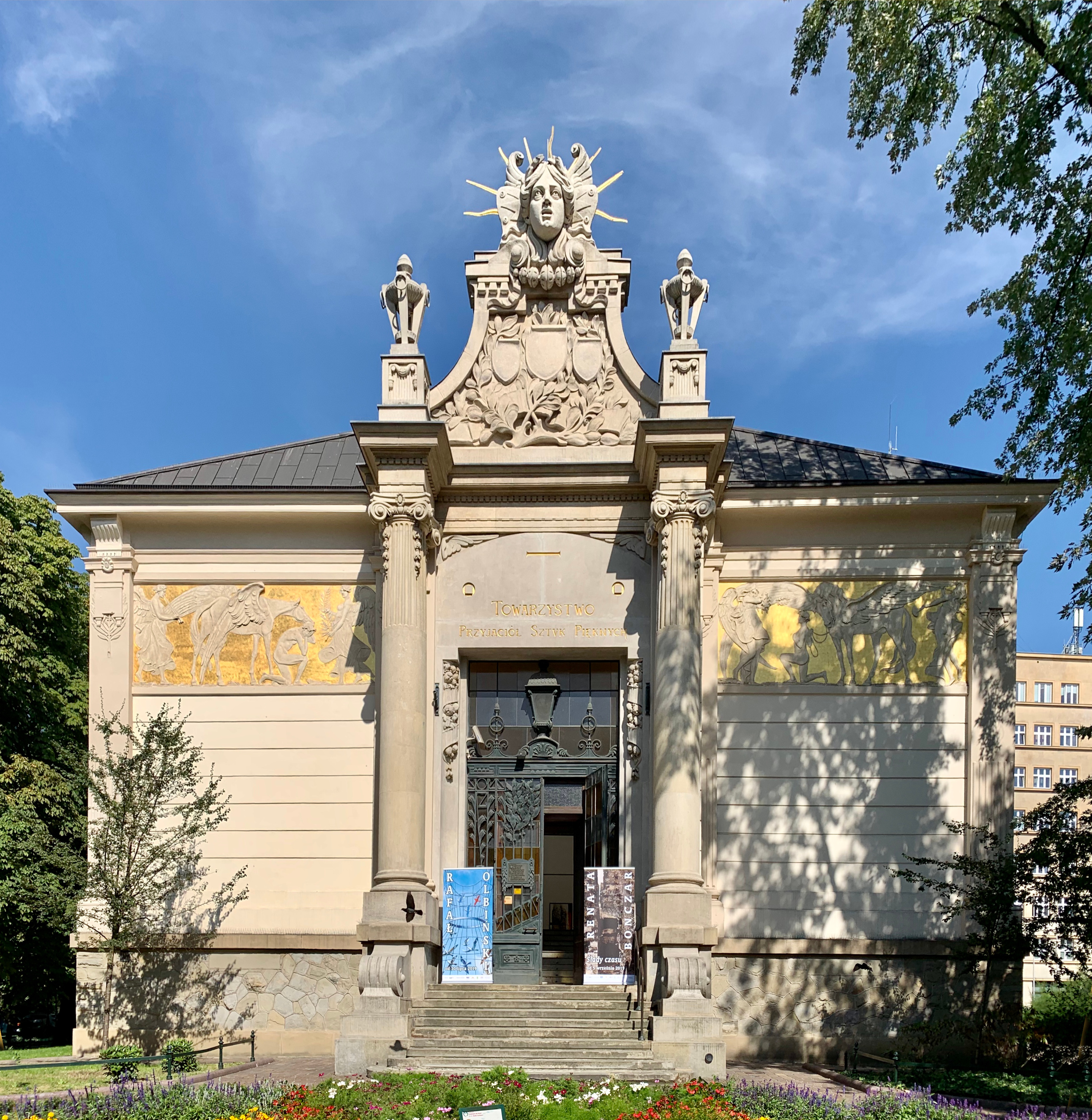
Palace of Art, also known as "Secession" headquarters of the Kraków Society of Friends of Fine Arts, in Kraków Old Town

Young Poland (Polish: Młoda Polska [ˈmwɔ.da ˈpɔl.ska]) was a modernist period in Polish visual arts, literature and music, covering roughly the years between 1890 and 1918. It was a result of strong aesthetic opposition to the earlier ideas of Positivism. Young Poland promoted trends of decadence, neo-romanticism, symbolism, Impressionism.

Many of the exhibitions were held at the Palace of Art, also known as "Secession" (Secesja), the headquarters of the Kraków Society of Friends of Fine Arts, in Kraków Old Town.

== Philosophy ==
The term was coined in a manifesto by writer Artur Górski, published in 1898 in the Kraków newspaper Życie (Life), and was soon adopted in all of partitioned Poland by analogy to similar terms such as Young Germany, Young Belgium, Young Scandinavia, etc.

== Literature ==
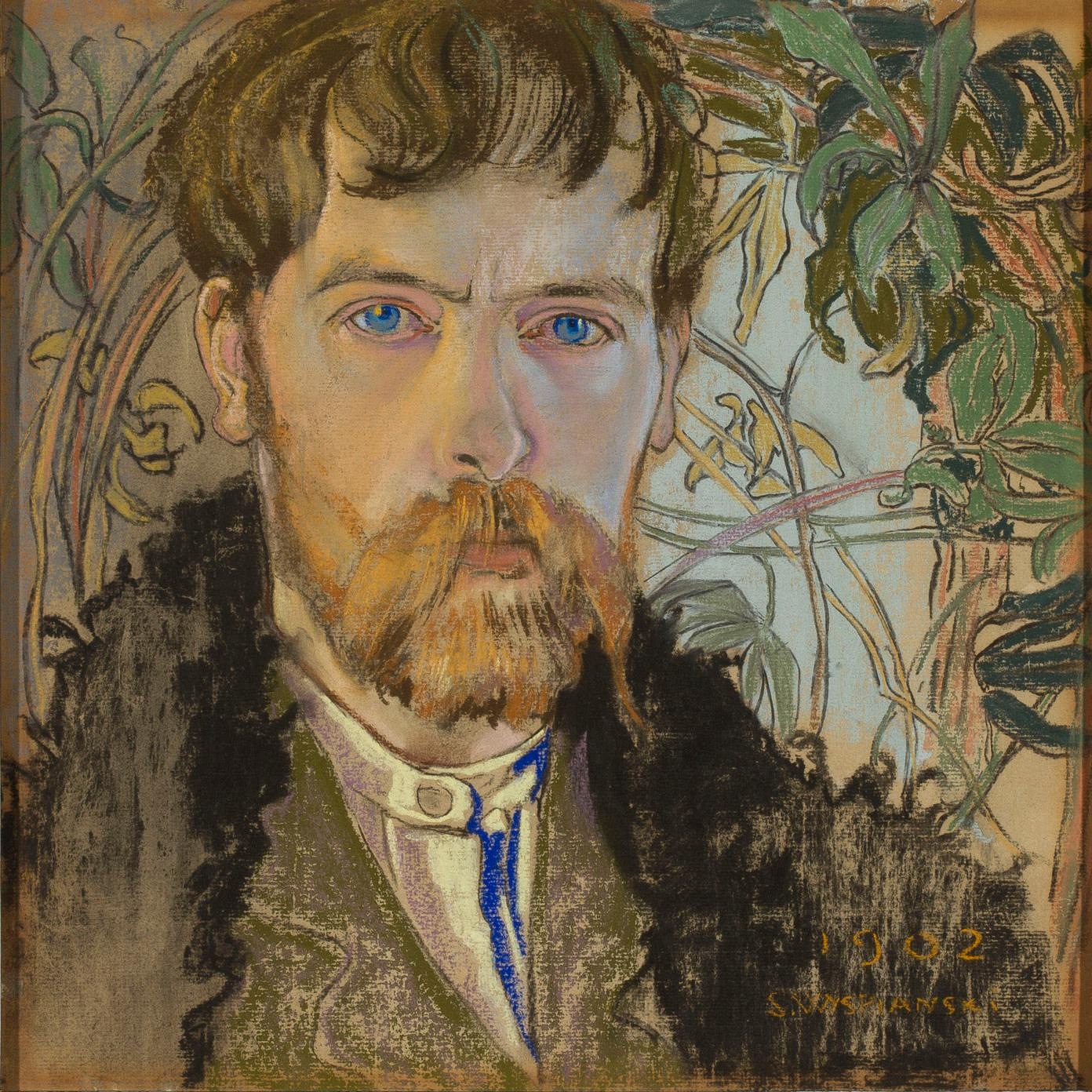
Stanisław Wyspiański self-portrait in soft pastel, 1902

Polish literature of the period was based on two main concepts. The earlier was a typically modernist disillusionment with the bourgeoisie, its life style and its culture. Artists following this concept also believed in decadence, an end of all culture, conflict between humans and their civilization, and the concept of art as the highest value (art for art's sake). Authors who followed this concept included Kazimierz Przerwa-Tetmajer, Stanisław Przybyszewski, Wacław Rolicz-Lieder and Jan Kasprowicz.

A later concept was a continuation of romanticism, and as such is often called neo-romanticism. The group of writers following this idea was less organised and the writers themselves covered a large variety of topics in their writings: from sense of mission of a Pole in Stefan Żeromski's prose, through social inequality described by Władysław Reymont and Gabriela Zapolska to criticism of Polish society and Polish history by Stanisław Wyspiański.

Writers of this period include also: Wacław Berent, Jan Kasprowicz, Jan Augustyn Kisielewski, Antoni Lange, Jan Lemański, Bolesław Leśmian, Tadeusz Miciński, Andrzej Niemojewski, Franciszek Nowicki, Władysław Orkan, Artur Oppman, Włodzimierz Perzyński, Tadeusz Rittner, Wacław Sieroszewski, Leopold Staff, Kazimierz Przerwa-Tetmajer, Maryla Wolska, Eleonora Kalkowska, Tadeusz Boy-Żeleński, and Jerzy Żuławski.

== Music ==
In music, the term Young Poland is applied to an informal group of composers that include Karol Szymanowski, Grzegorz Fitelberg, Ludomir Różycki as well as Mieczysław Karłowicz and Apolinary Szeluto. Almost all educated by Zygmunt Noskowski, the group was under strong influence of neoromanticism in music and especially of foreign composers such as Richard Strauss, Richard Wagner and those belonging to The Mighty Handful group, e.g. Modest Mussorgsky, Alexander Borodin and Nikolai Rimsky-Korsakov.

== Visual arts ==
In the period of Young Poland there were no overwhelming trends in Polish art. The painters and sculptors tried to continue the romantic traditions with new ways of expression popularised abroad. The most influential trend was Art Nouveau, although Polish artists started to seek also some form of a national style (including styl zakopiański or the Zakopane style). Both sculpture and painting were also heavily influenced by all forms of symbolism.

Stanisław Wyspiański was a poet, playwright and painter. His drawing, mainly in pastel, stylized to the extreme flowers, landscapes and portraits of children and actors in a testament to the influence of the Vienna Secession, and perhaps also of Japanese art. He also designed stained glass windows, furniture, carpets depicting religious scenes and floral motifs and with stylized lines and bright colors. His stained glass work can be seen in the Wawel Cathedral and the Basilica of St. Francis of Assisi of Krakow, and he also painted the mural of the Basilica of St. Mary of Krakow.

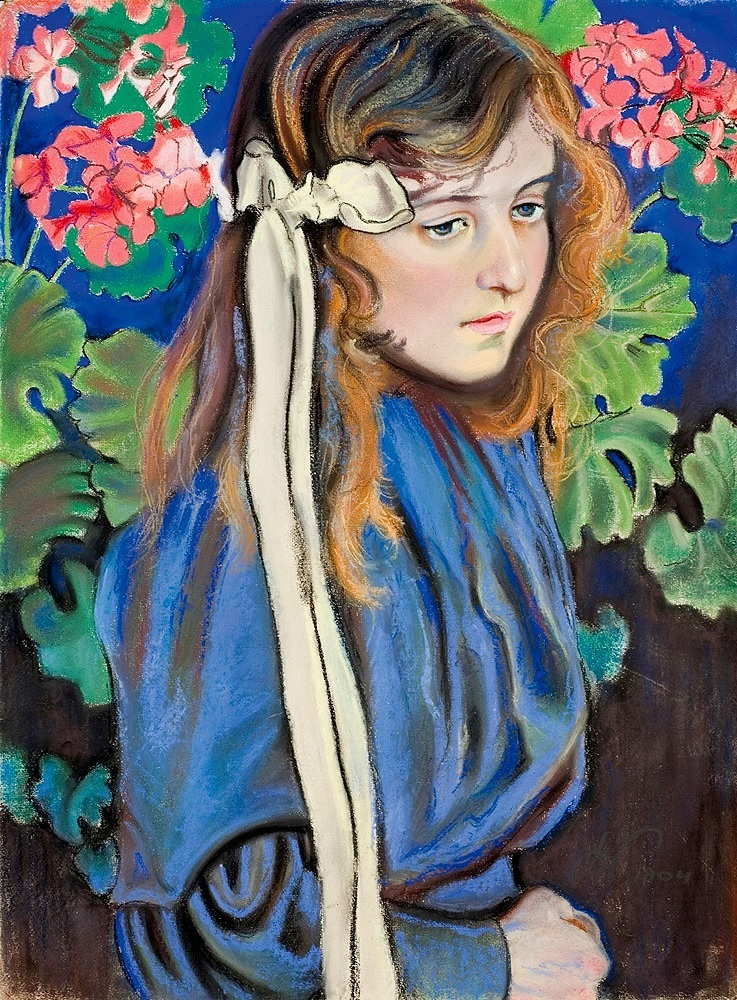

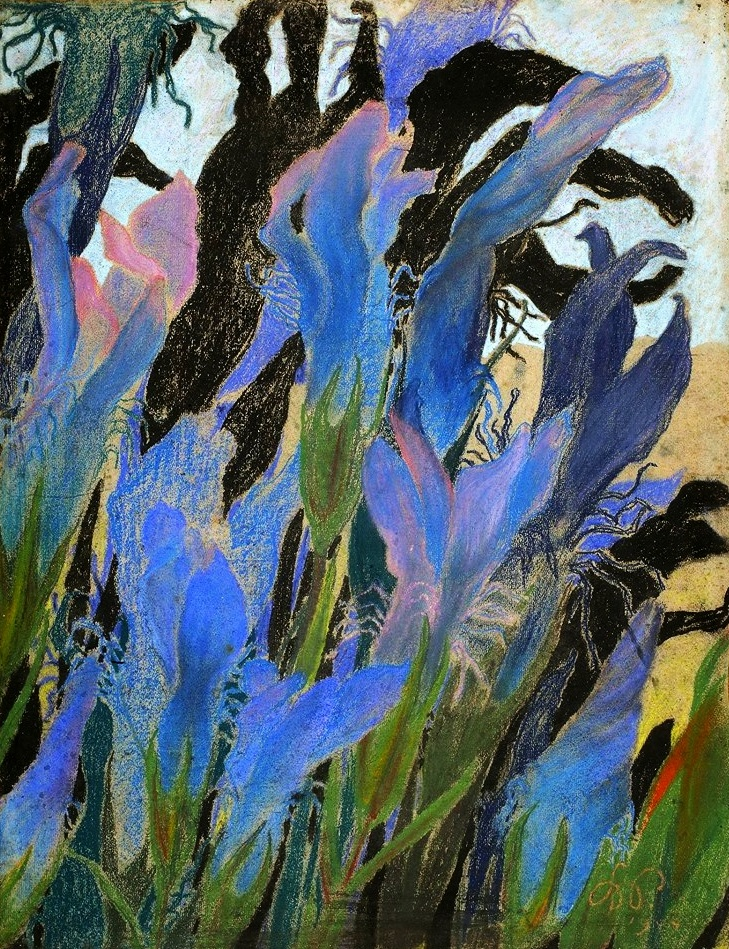

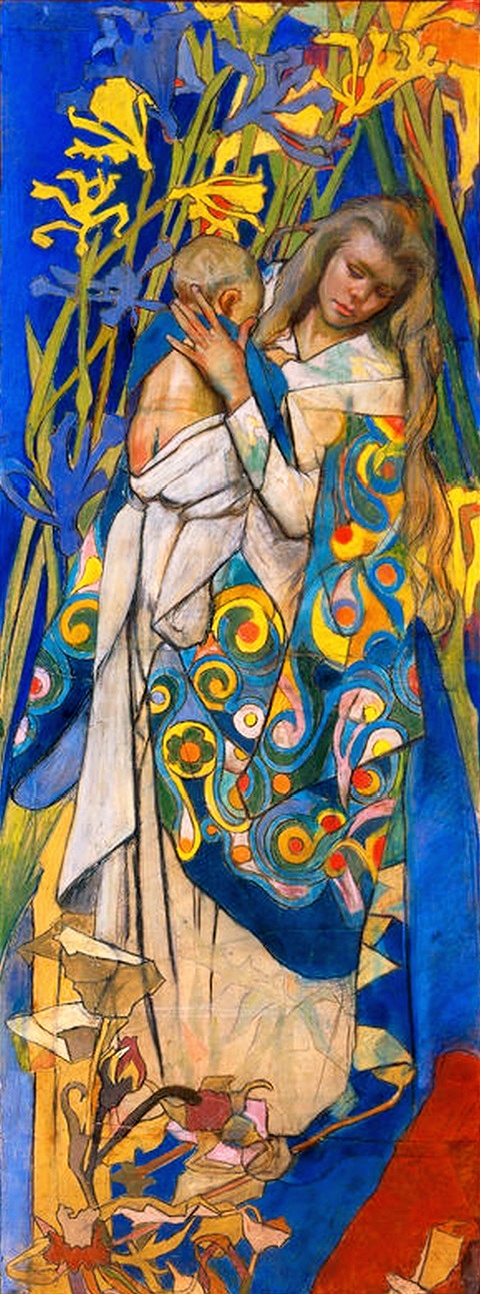

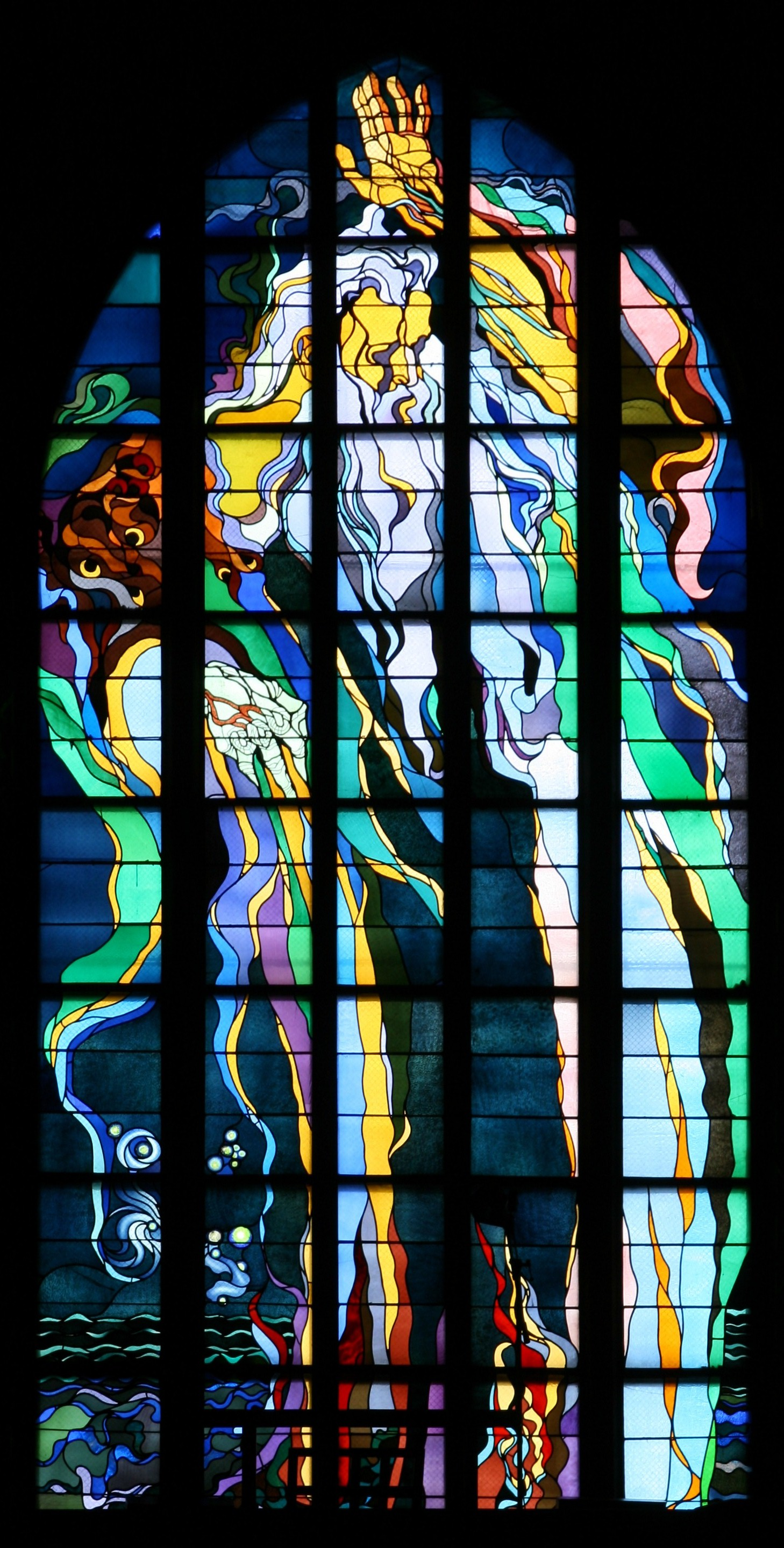

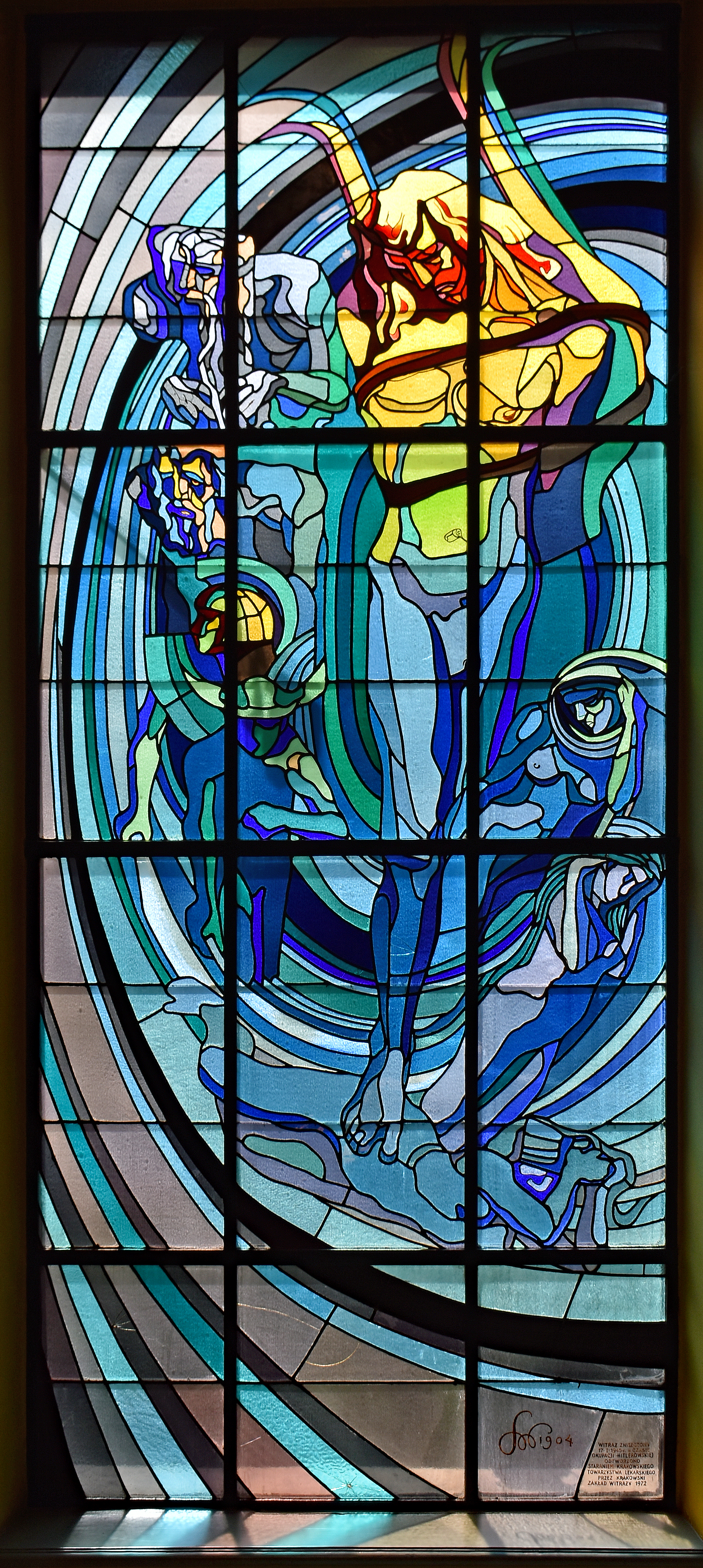

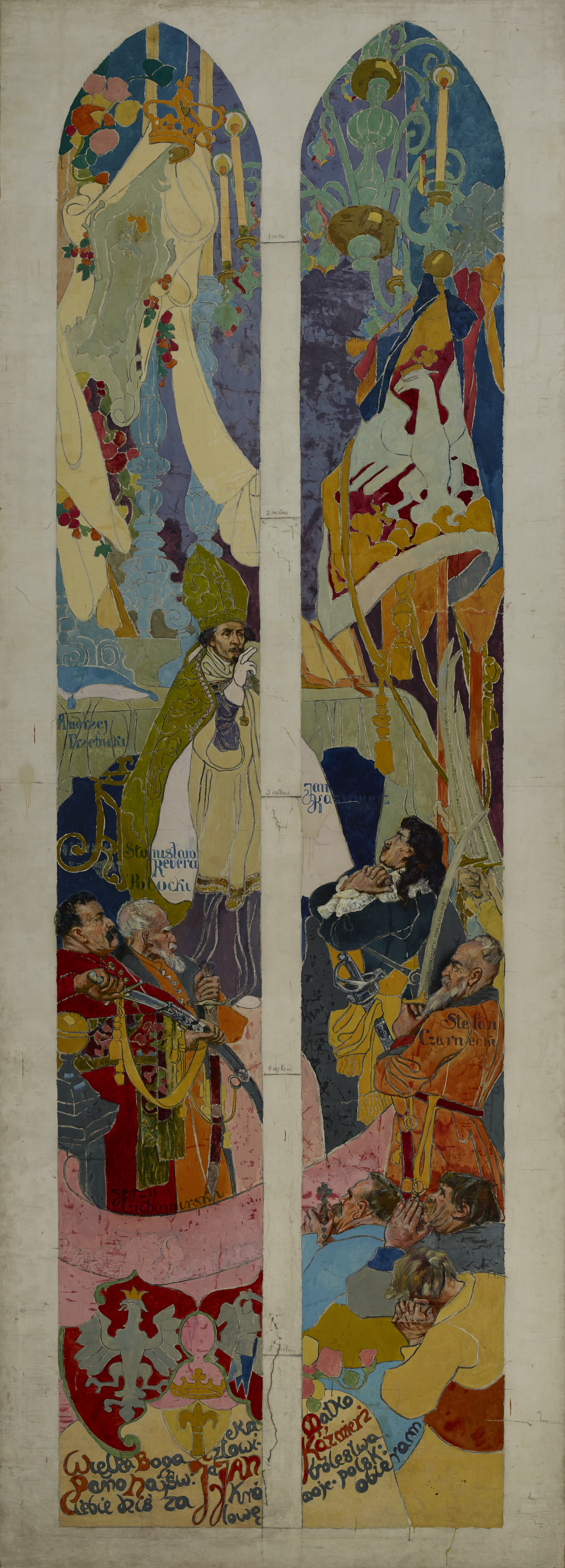

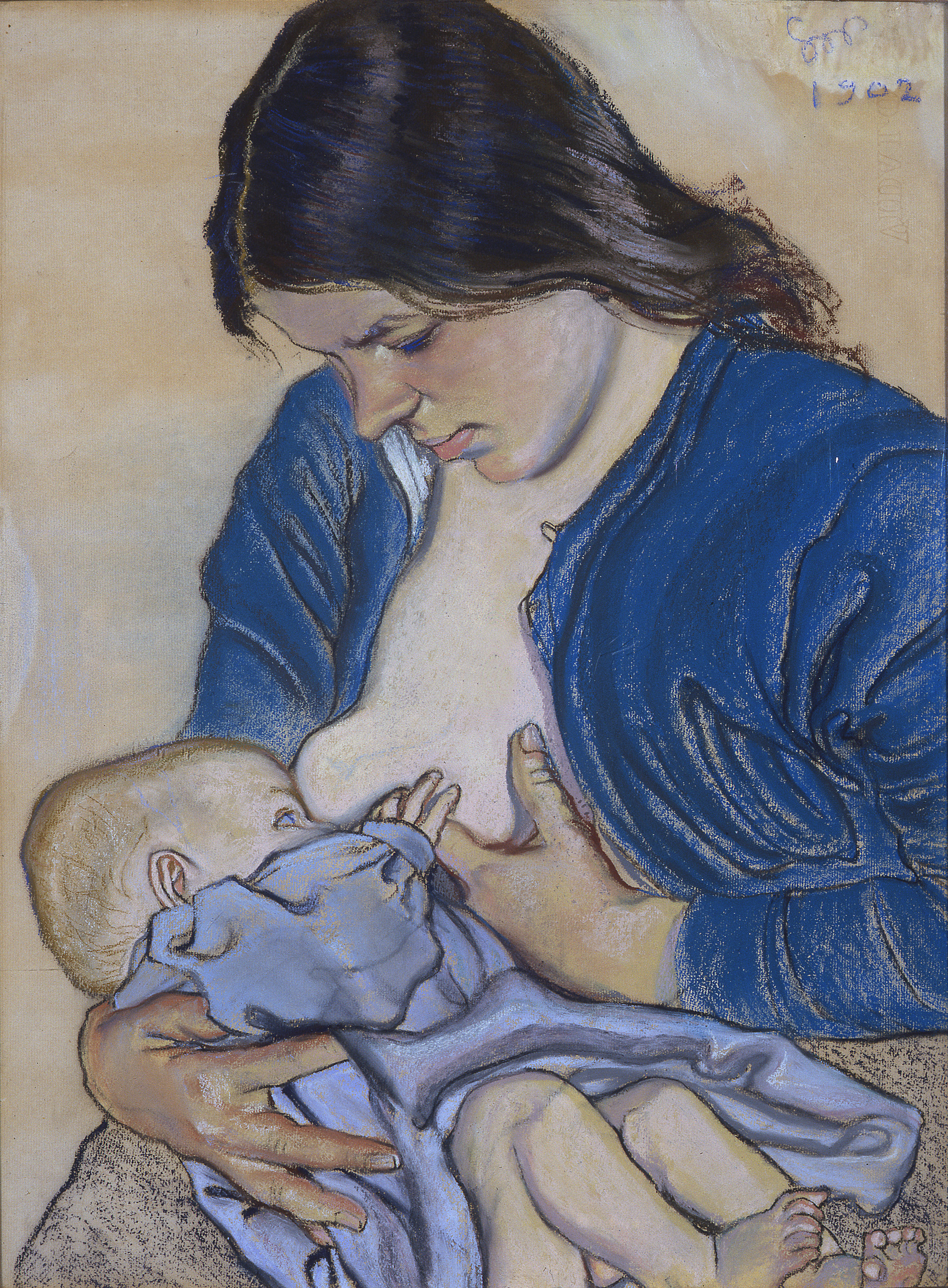

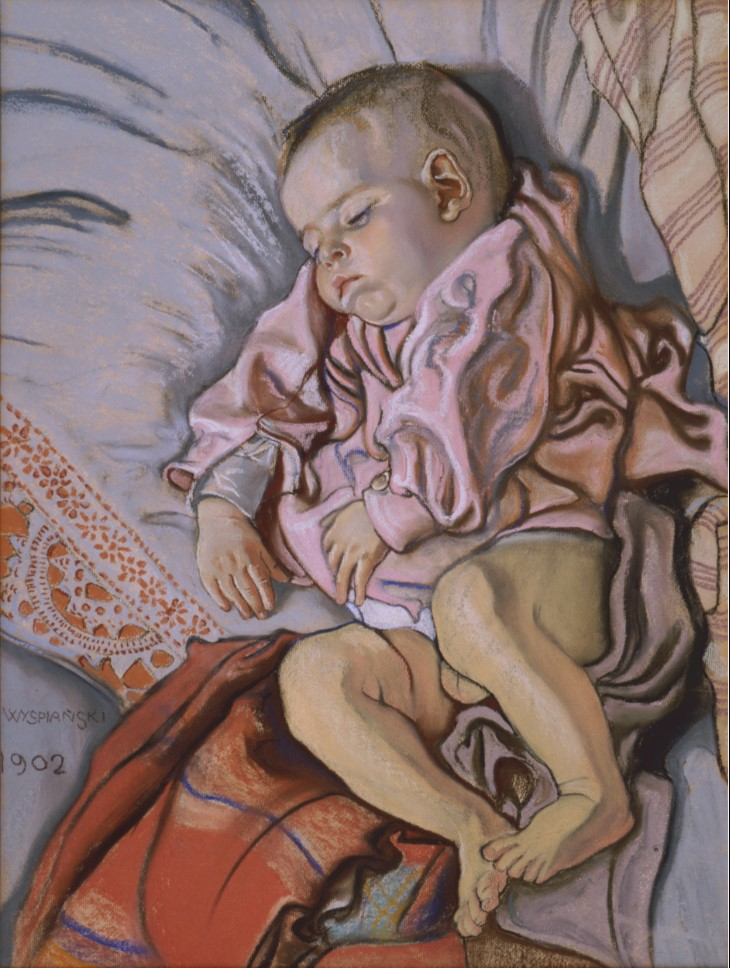

Józef Mehoffer (1869–1946) was a painter and illustrator, but it was his work as a glassmaker that earned him his fame. He made the stained glass windows for the Fribourg Cathedral, as well as for a dozen other churches in Europe. He collaborated with Wyspiański on the polychromes of the Basilica of St. Mary of Krakow and on the stained glass windows of the Chapel of the Holy Cross in the Wawel Cathedral.

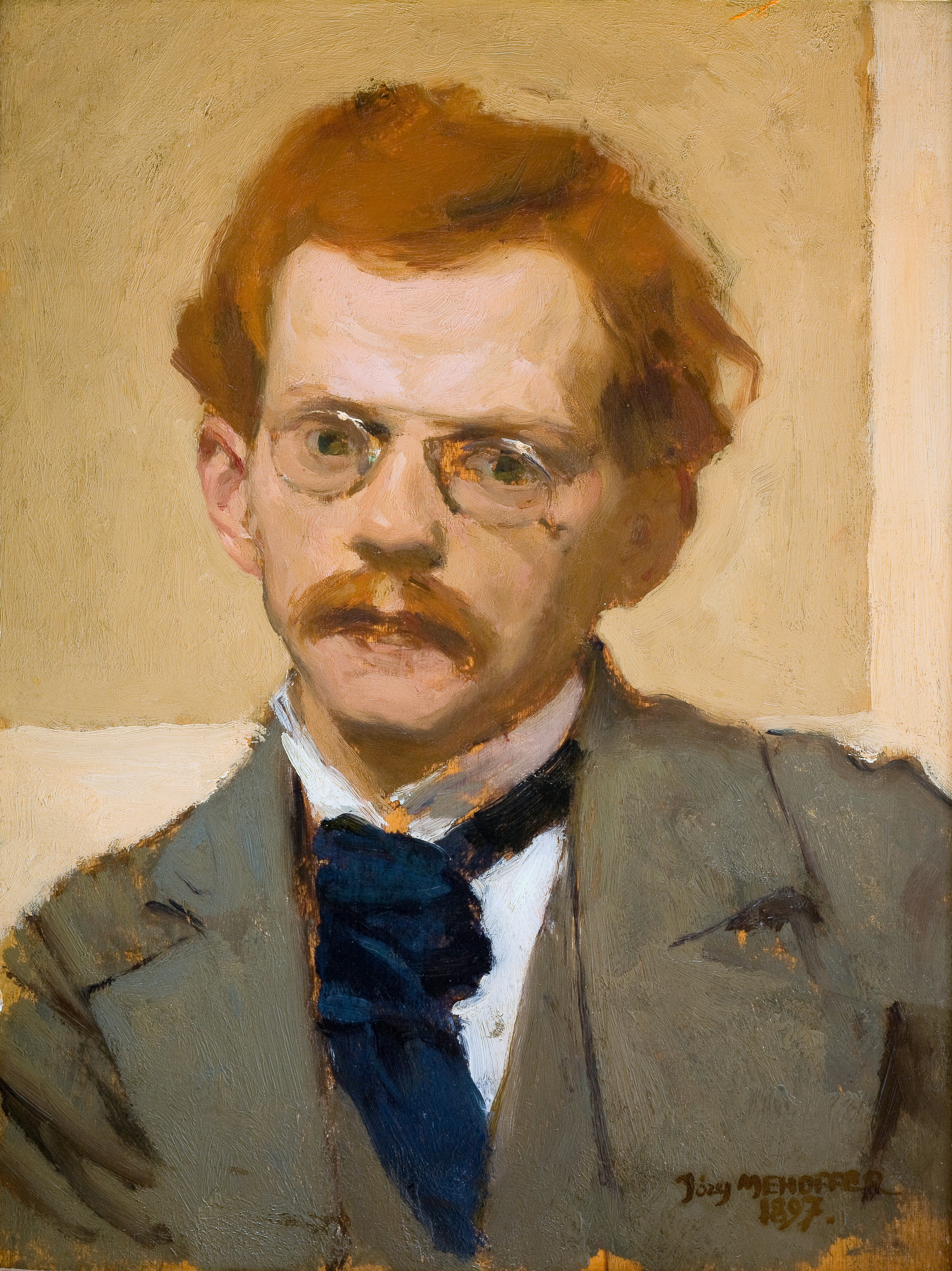

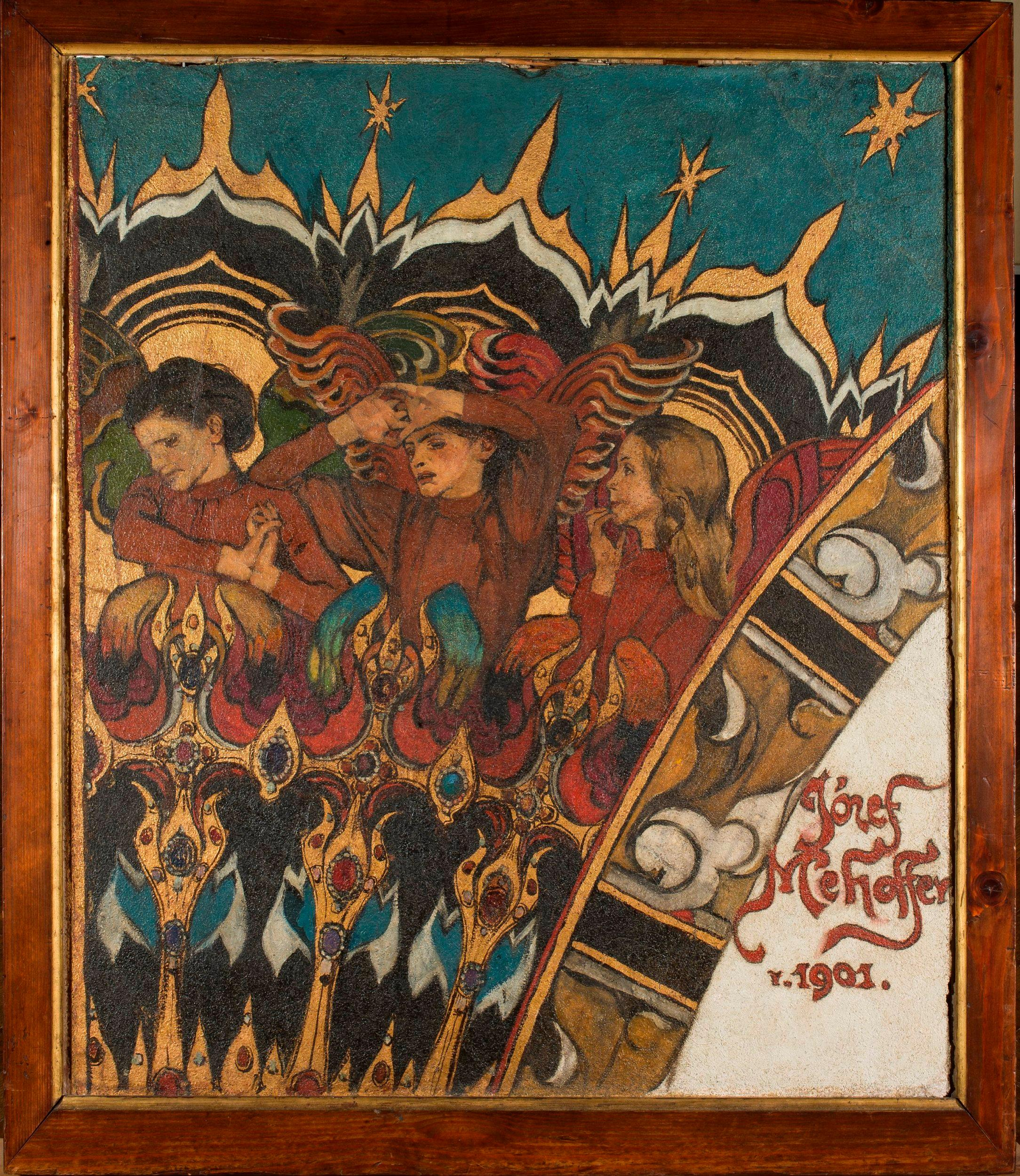

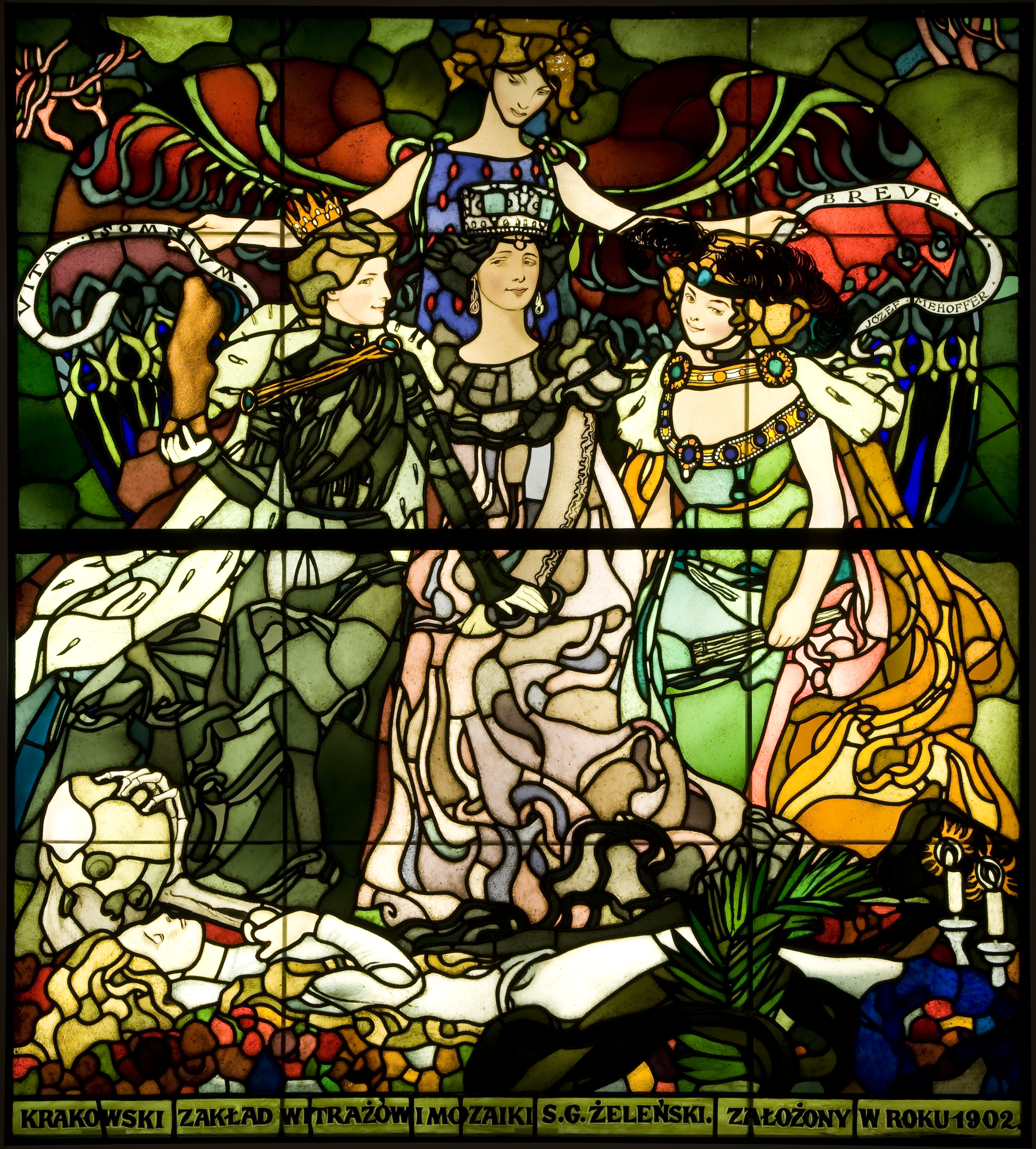

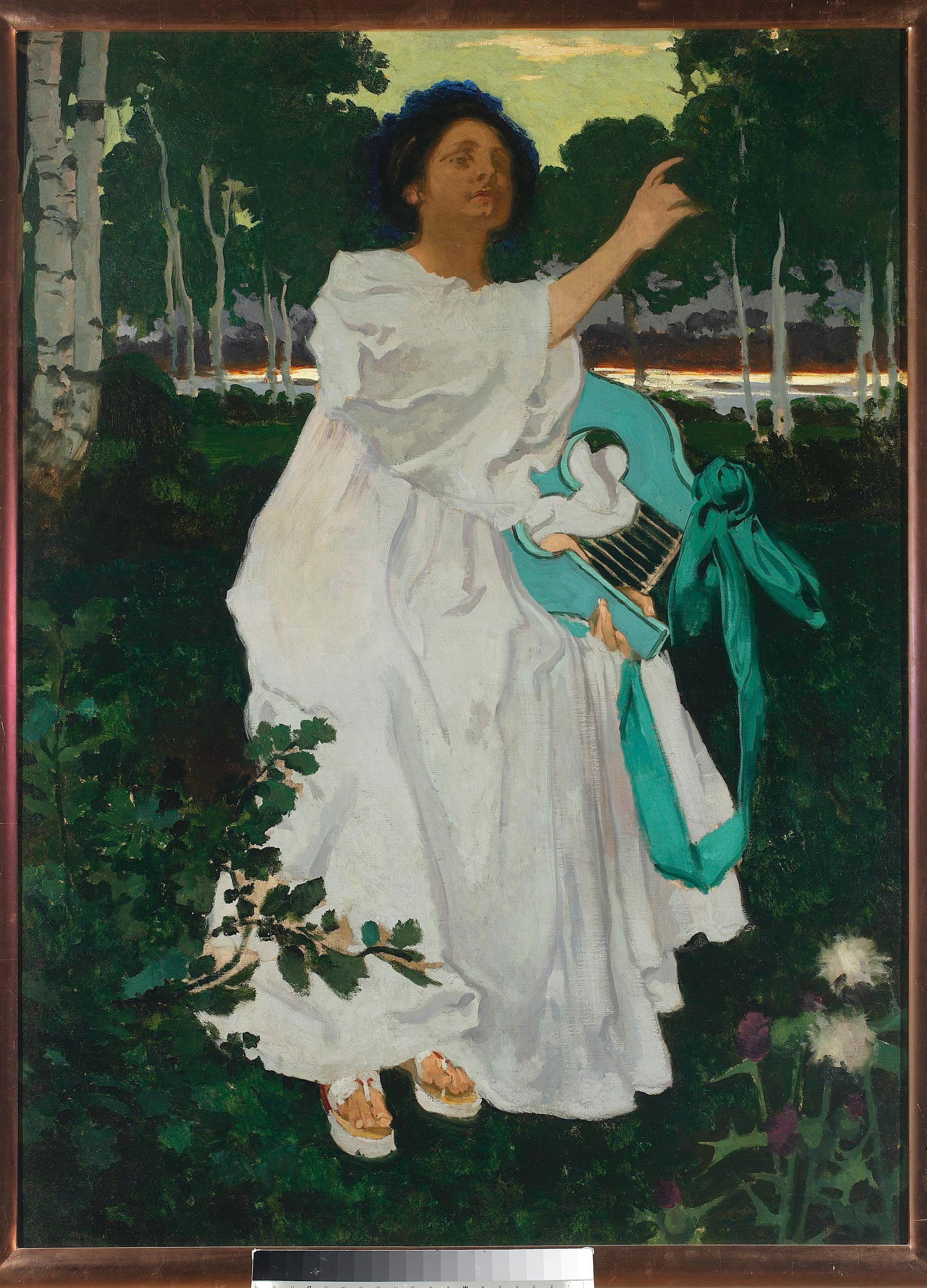

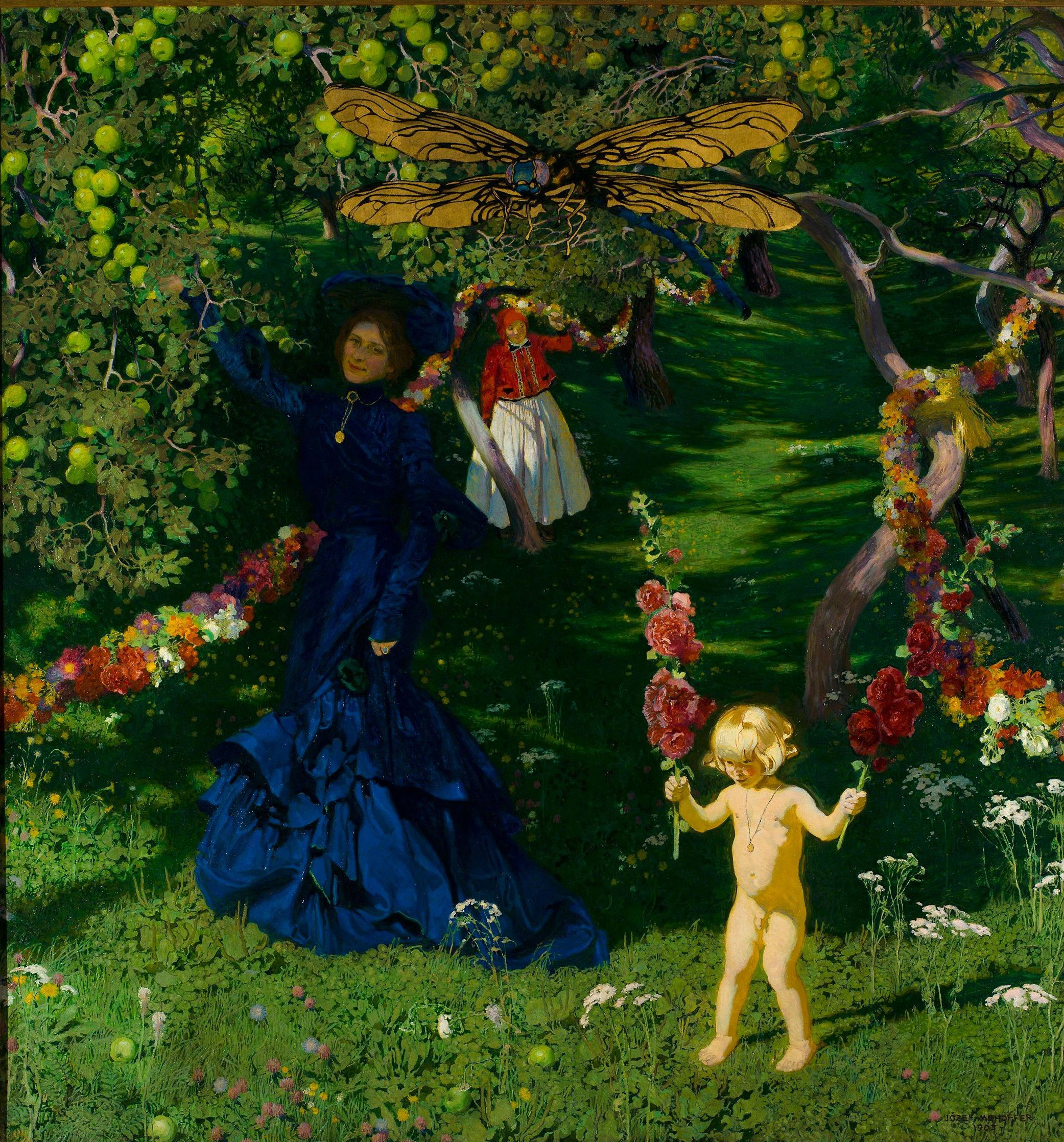

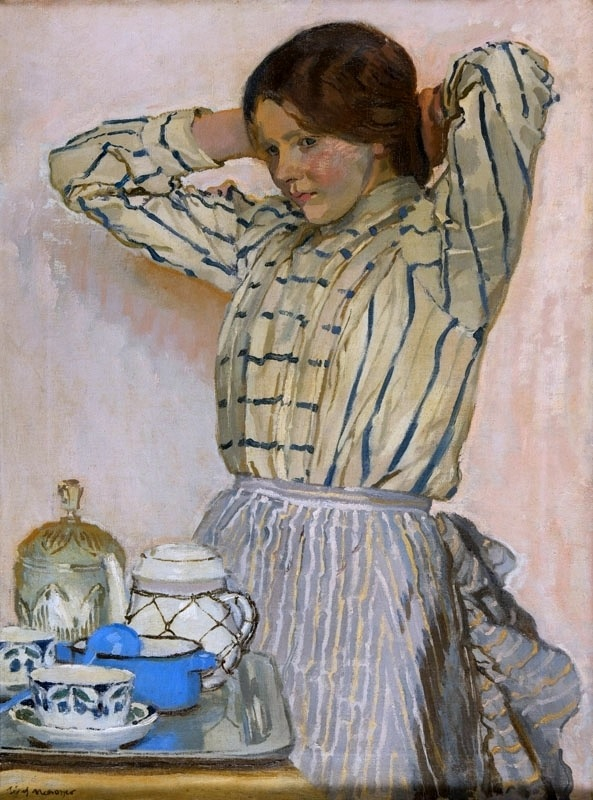

The most notable representatives of Polish symbolism are Władysław Podkowiński (1866–1899) and Jacek Malczewski (1854–1929). The latter placed his research in a national current and was particularly interested in the relationship between art and artist. He addressed the theme of the creator's duty in relation to the national past and reflected on the influence of art in real life. For nearly half a century, Malczewski developed cycles and series, mixing his own symbols with those of tradition, whose meaning he changed with new compositions.

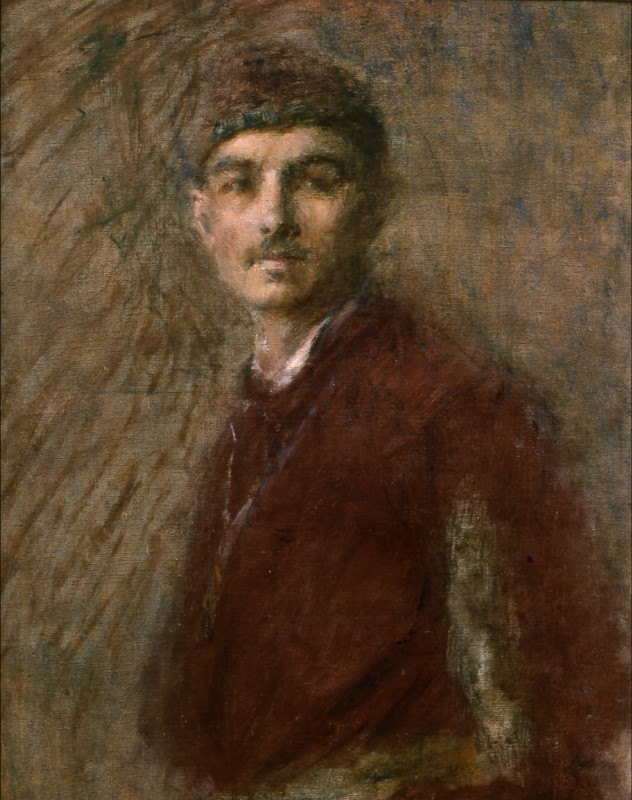

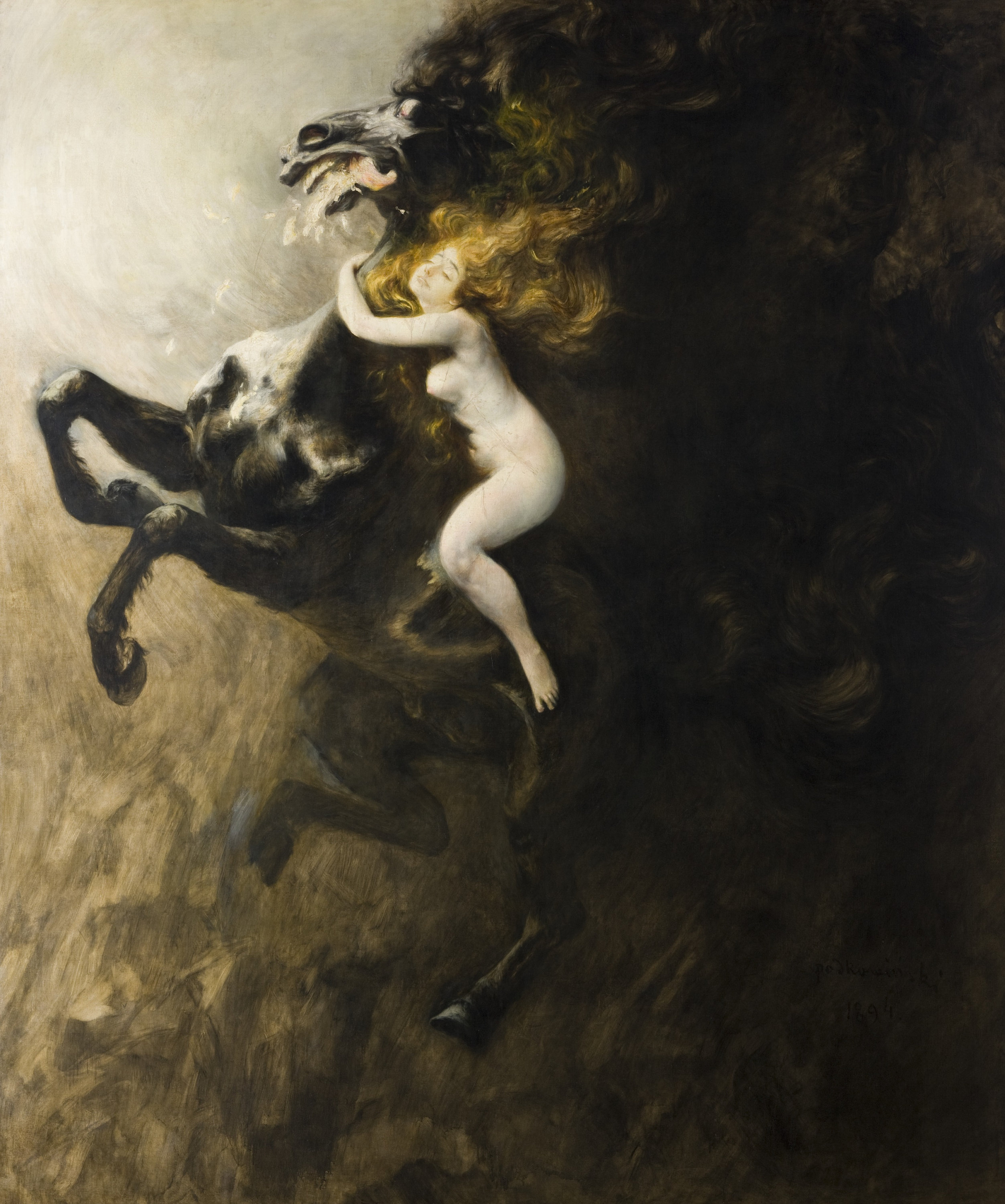

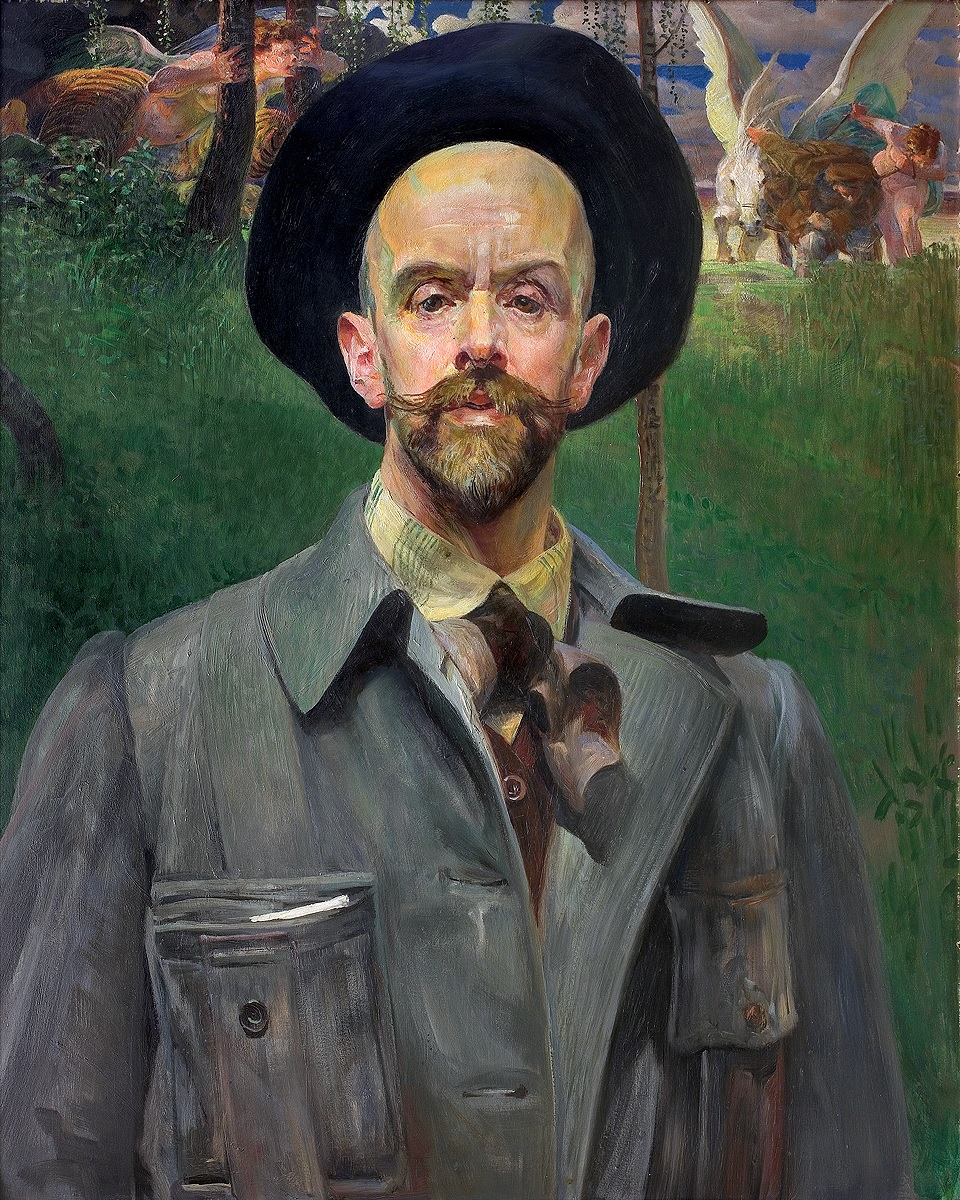

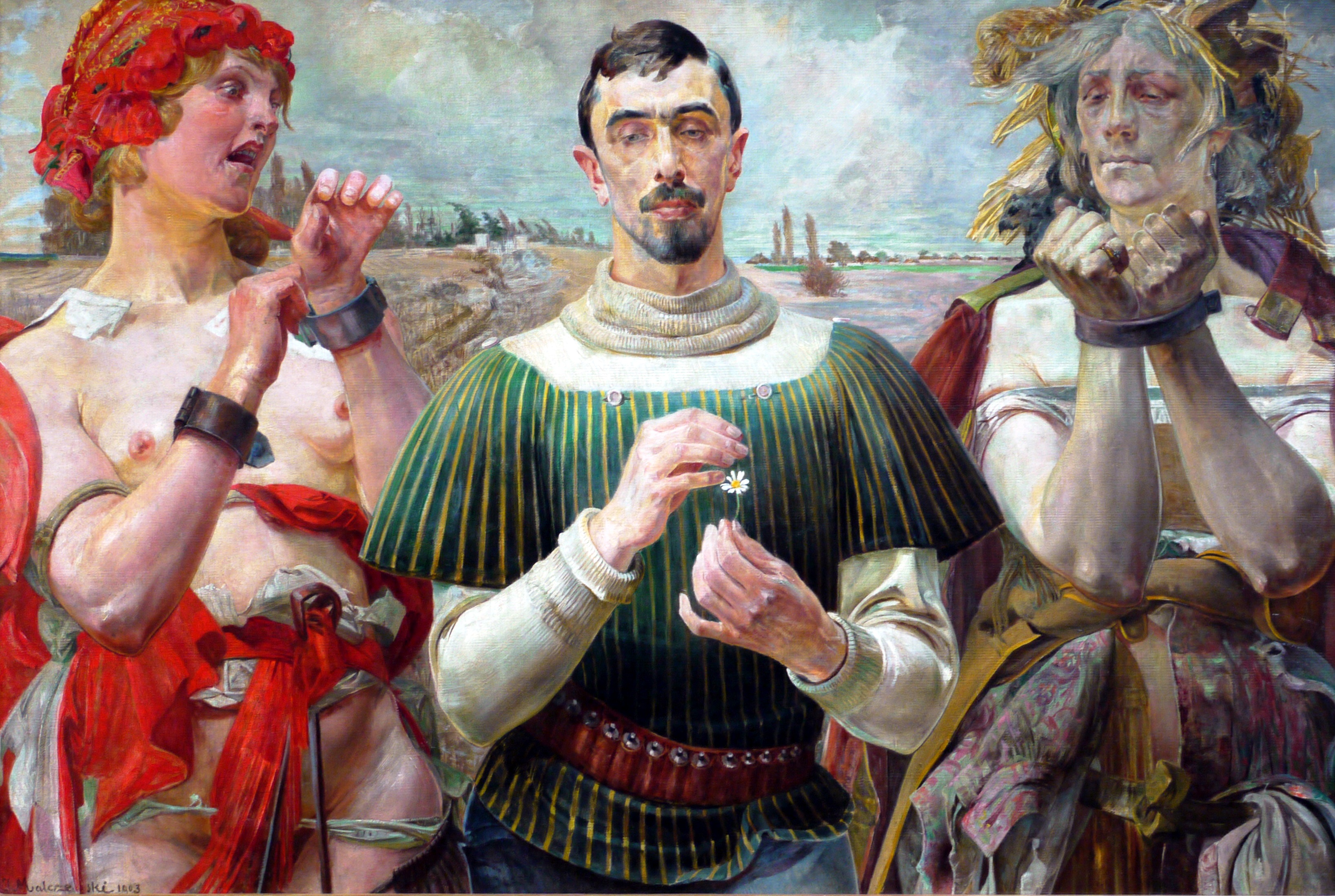

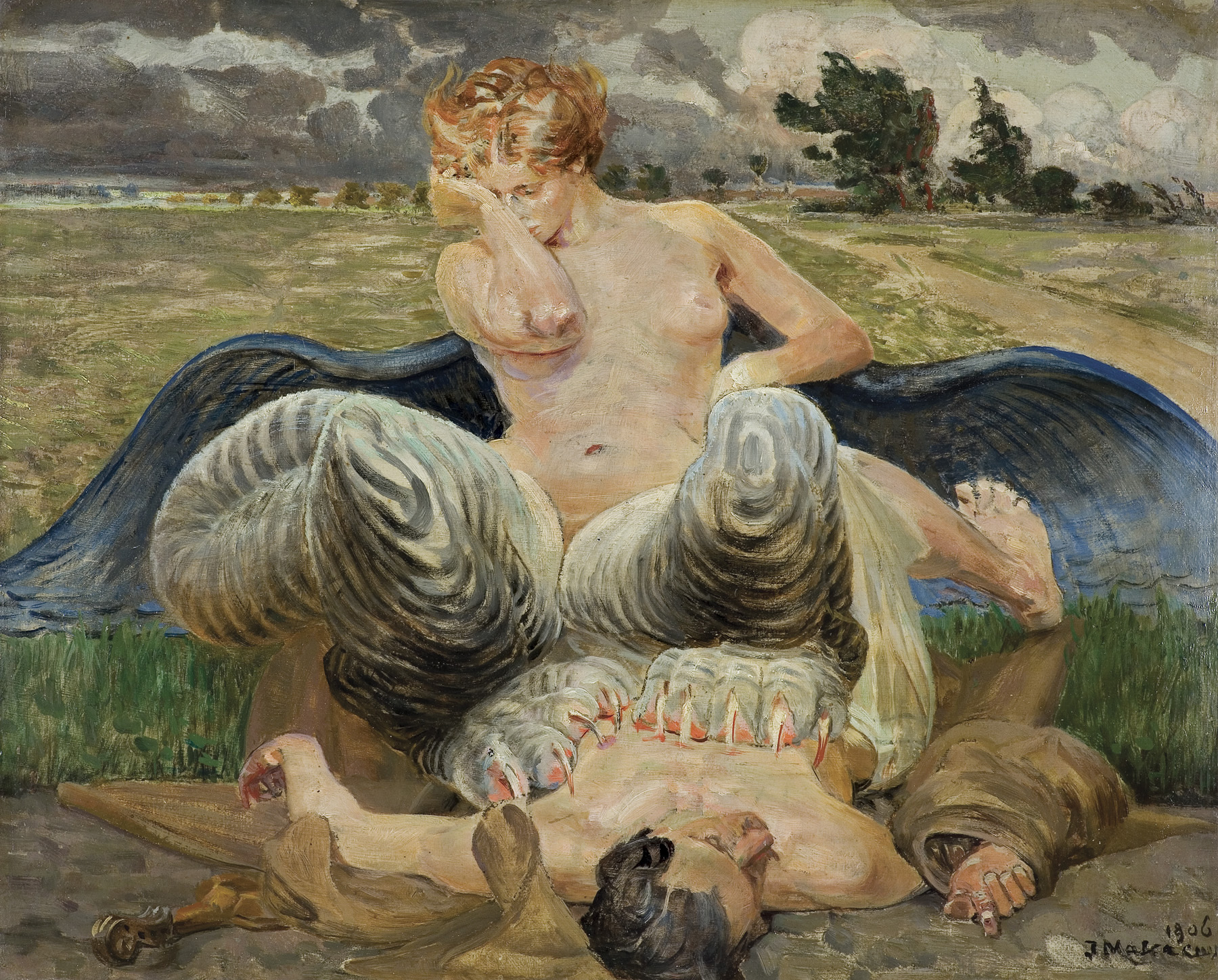

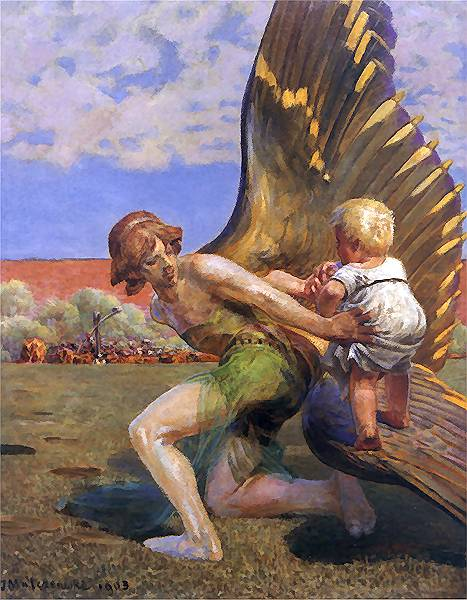

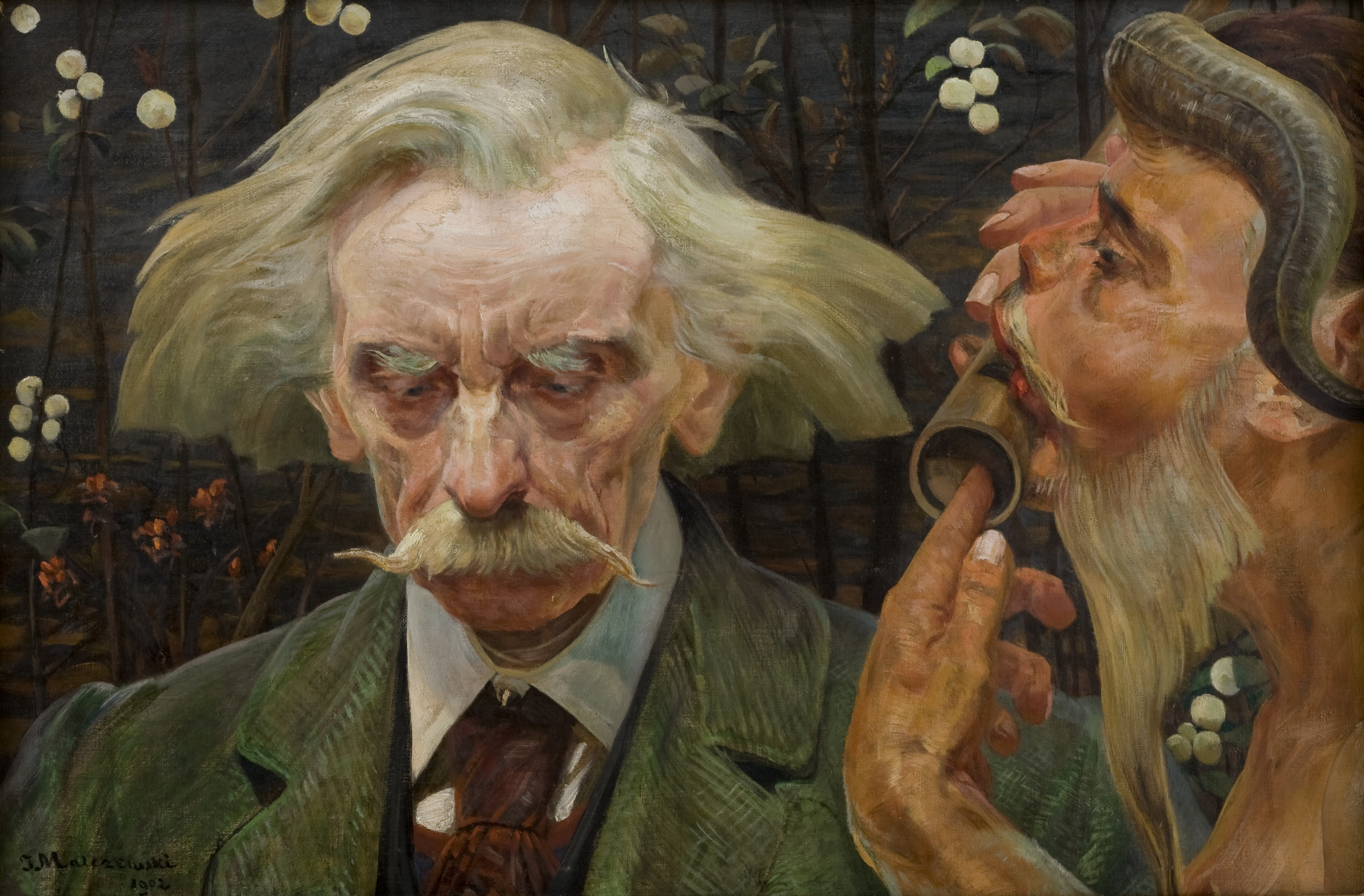

However, painting was dominated by French Impressionism. Artists were interested in rural life and exalted landscapes and peasants. Women and children were common subjects. Teodor Axentowicz (1859-1938),

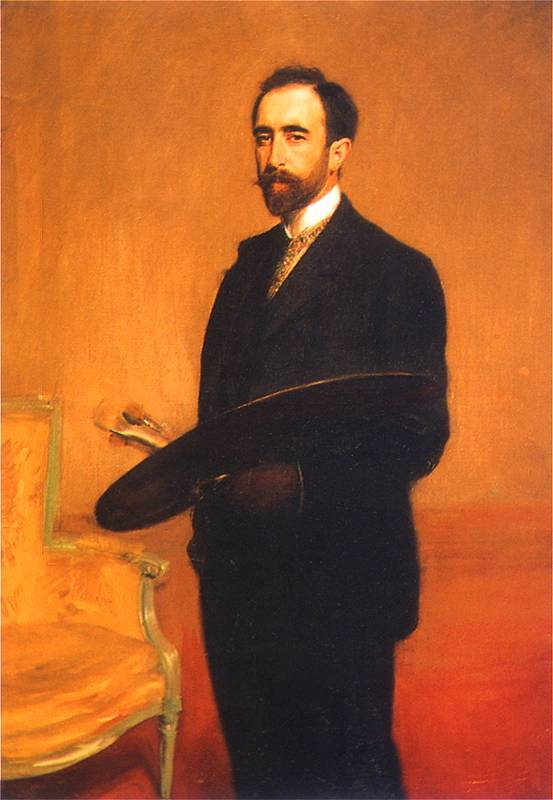

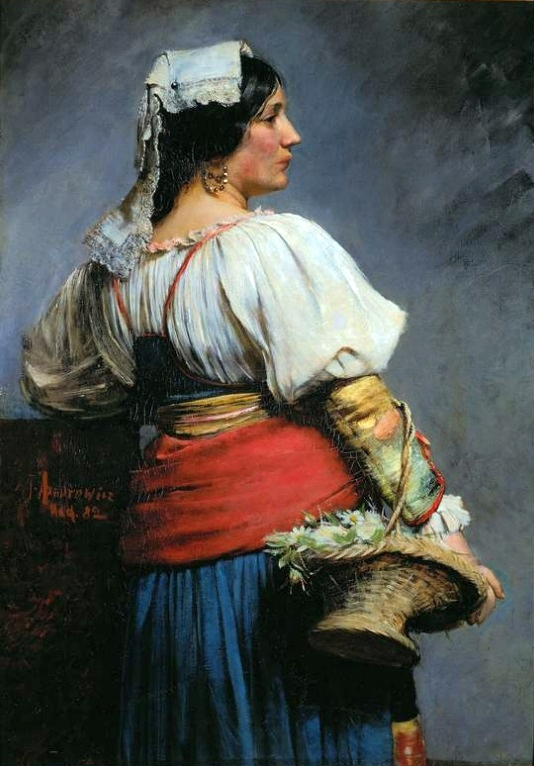

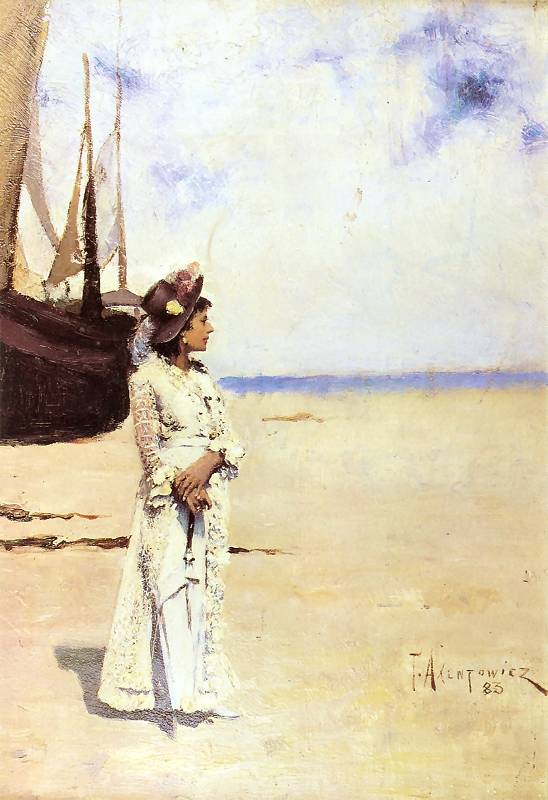

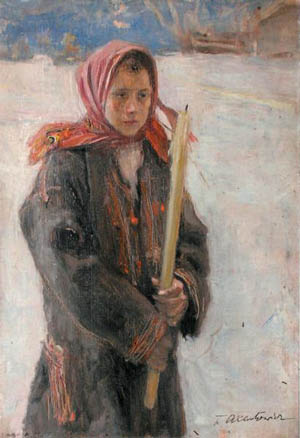

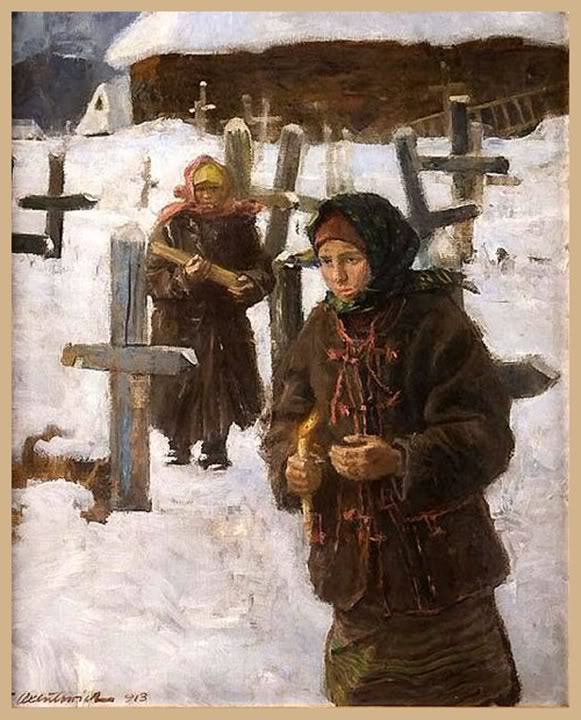

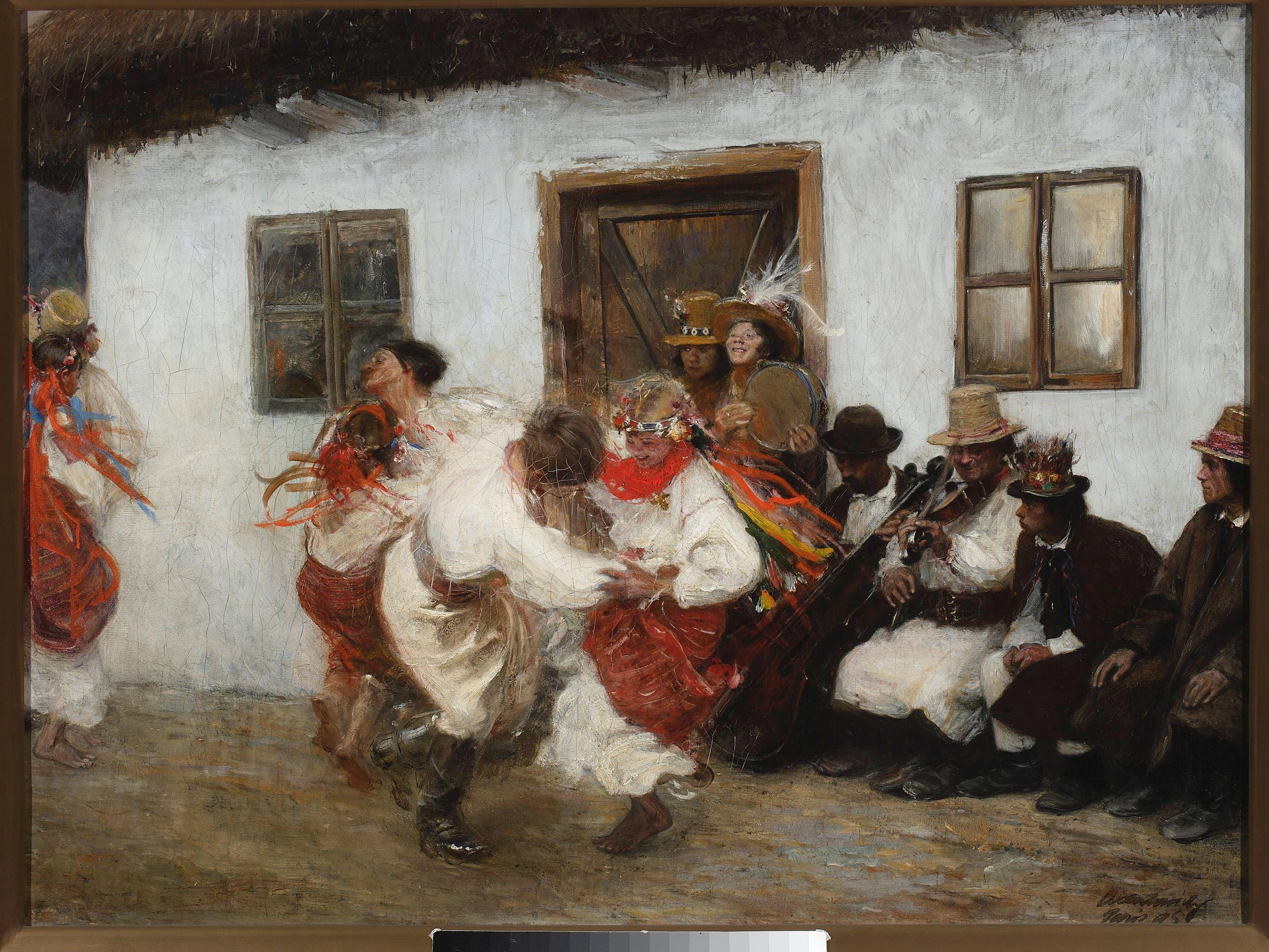

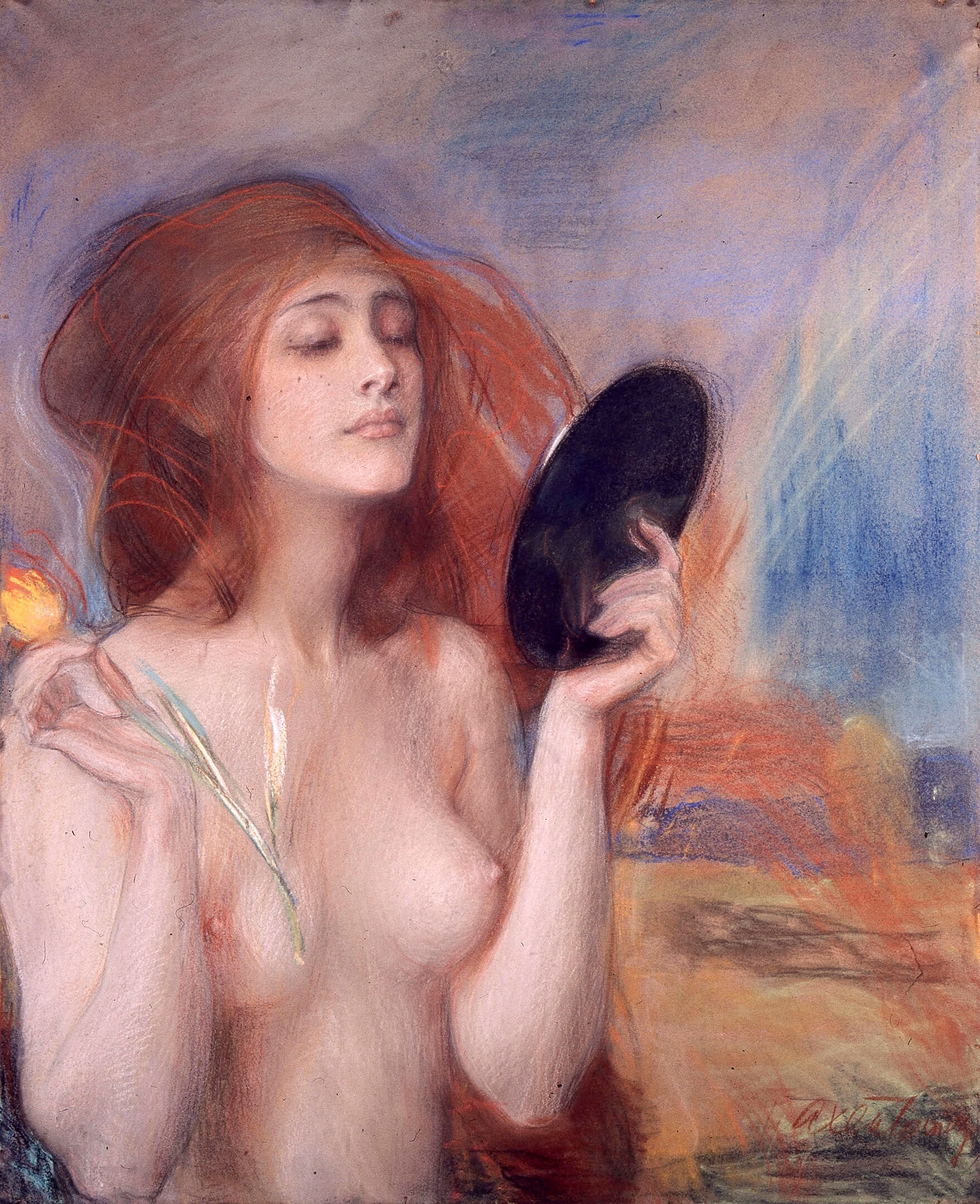

Olga Boznańska (1865-1940),

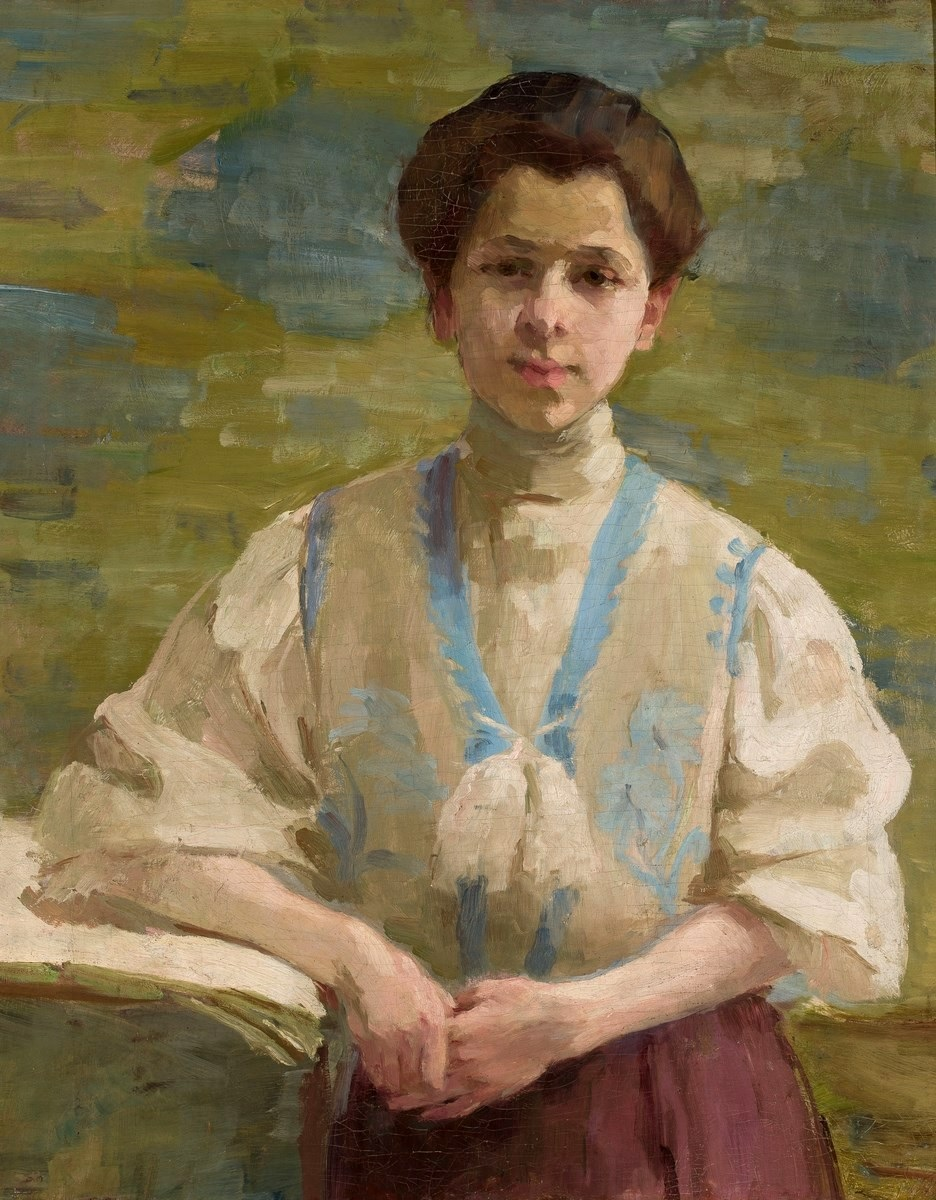

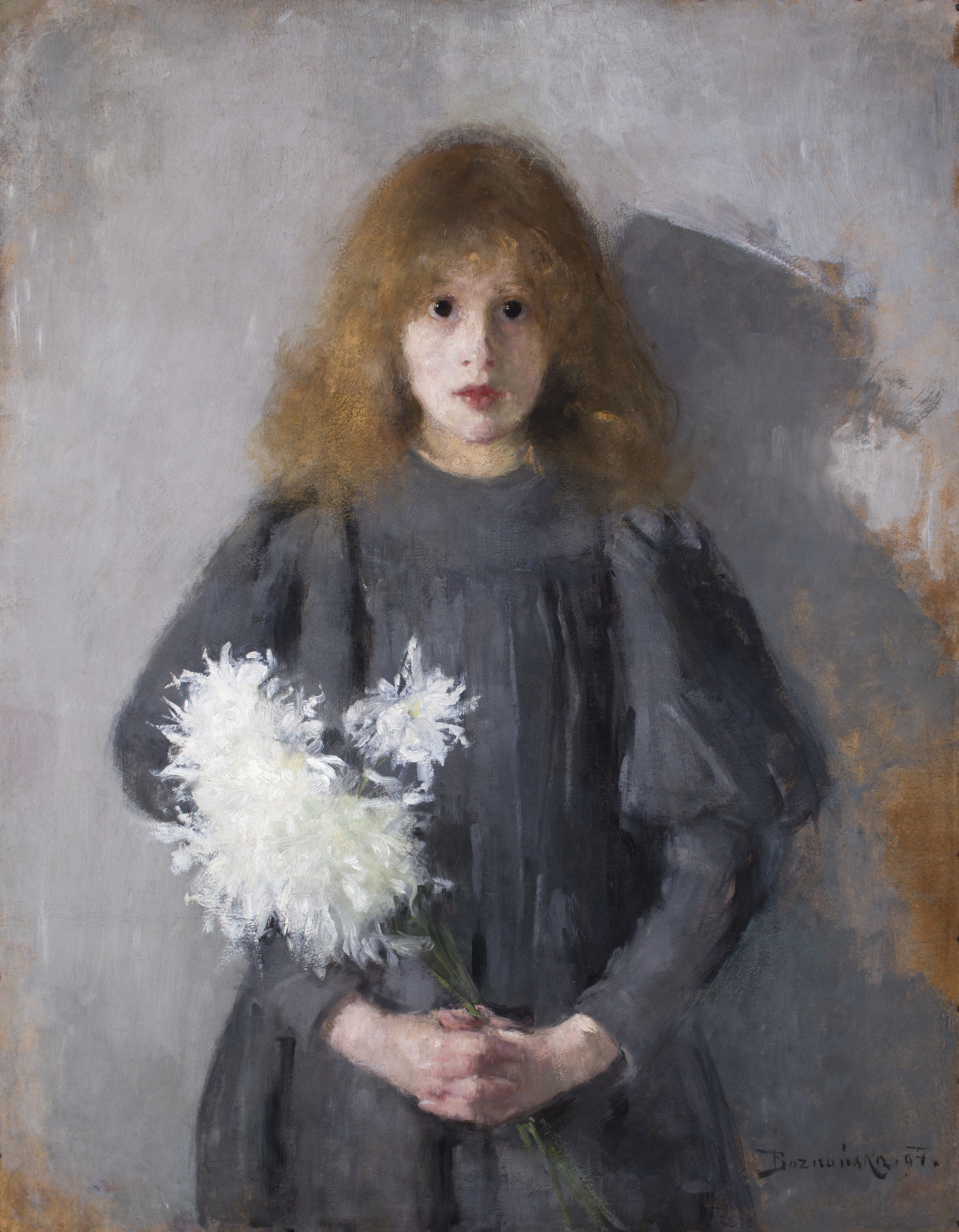

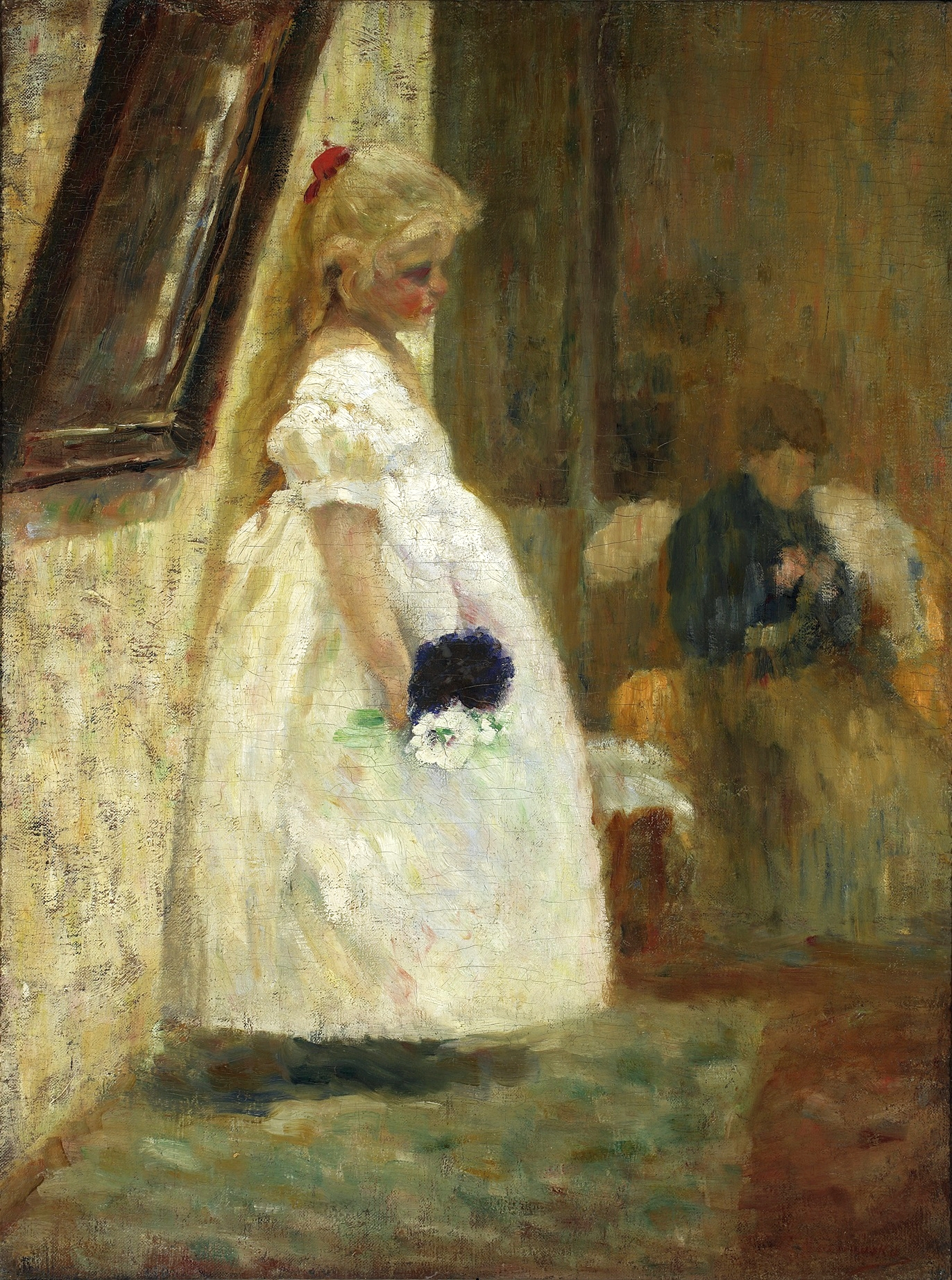

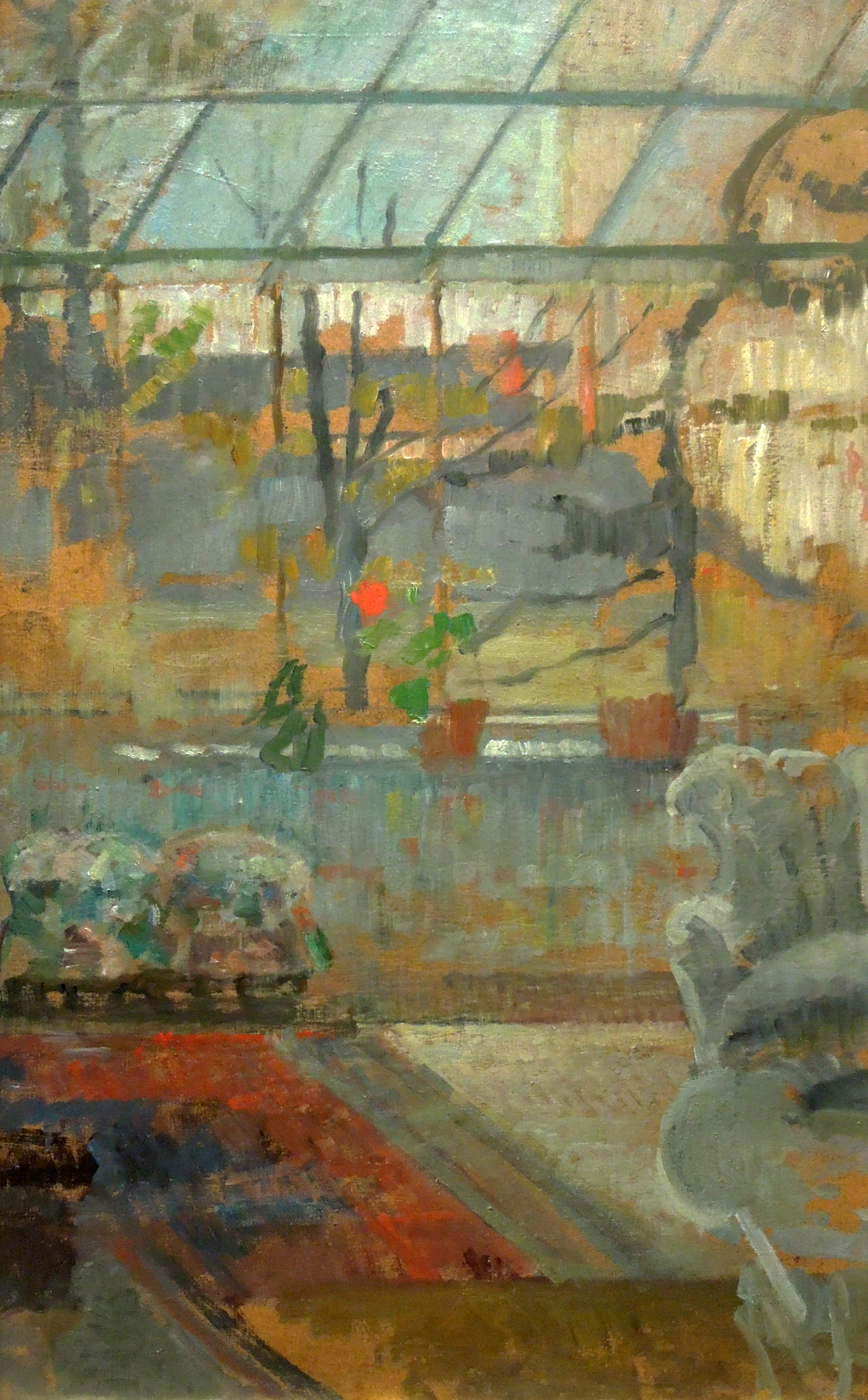

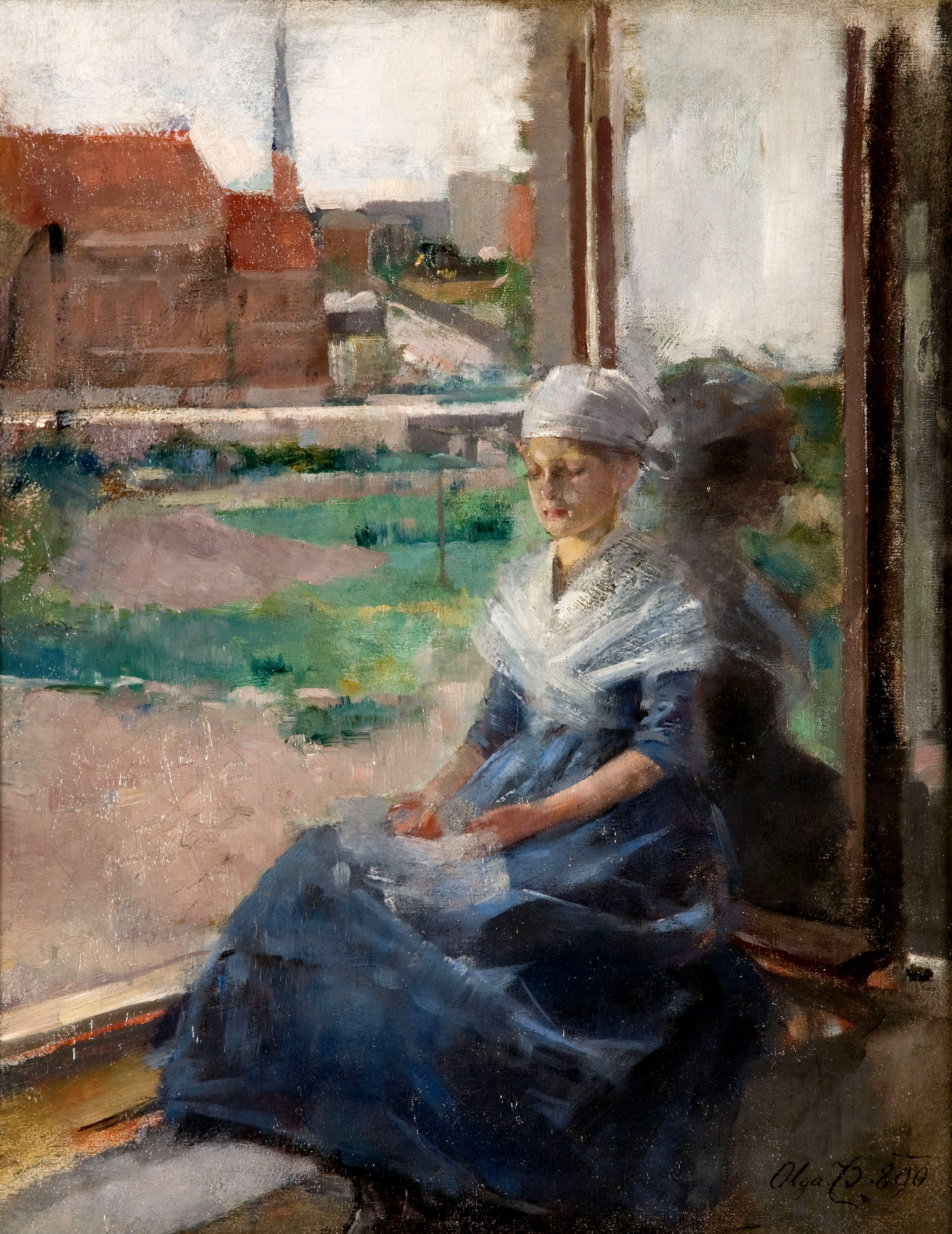

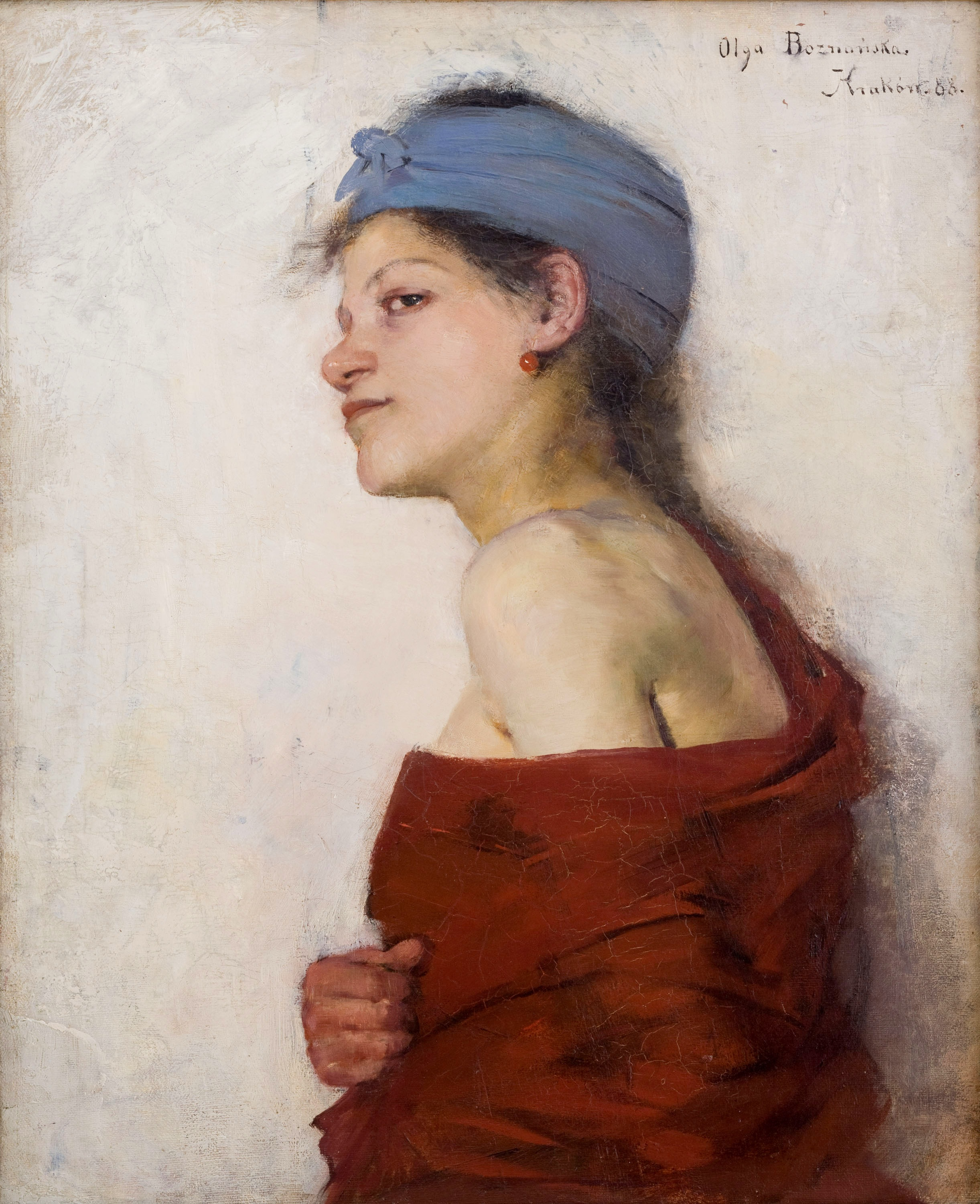

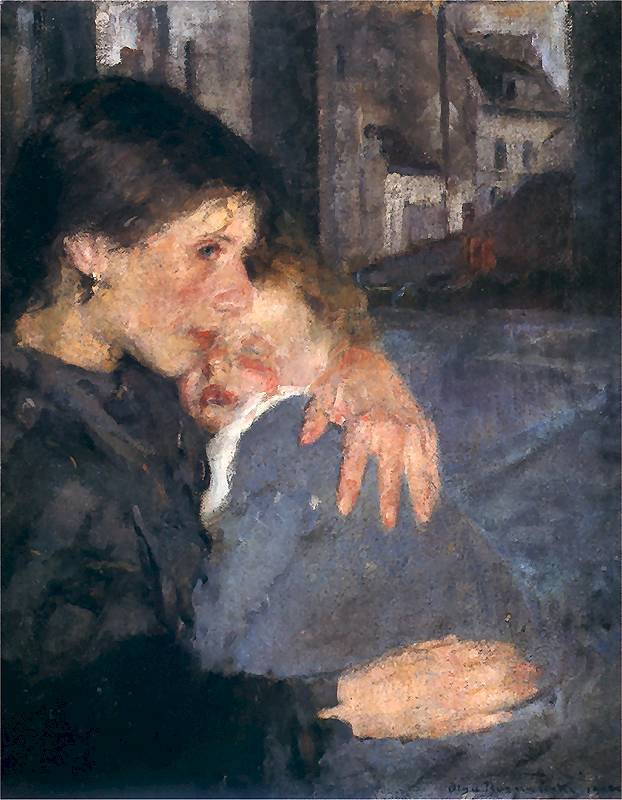

and Józef Pankiewicz (1866-1940).

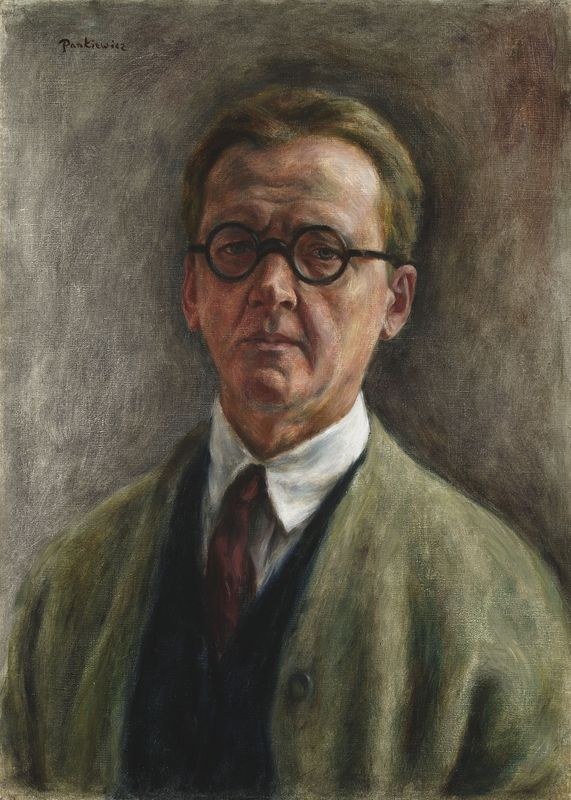

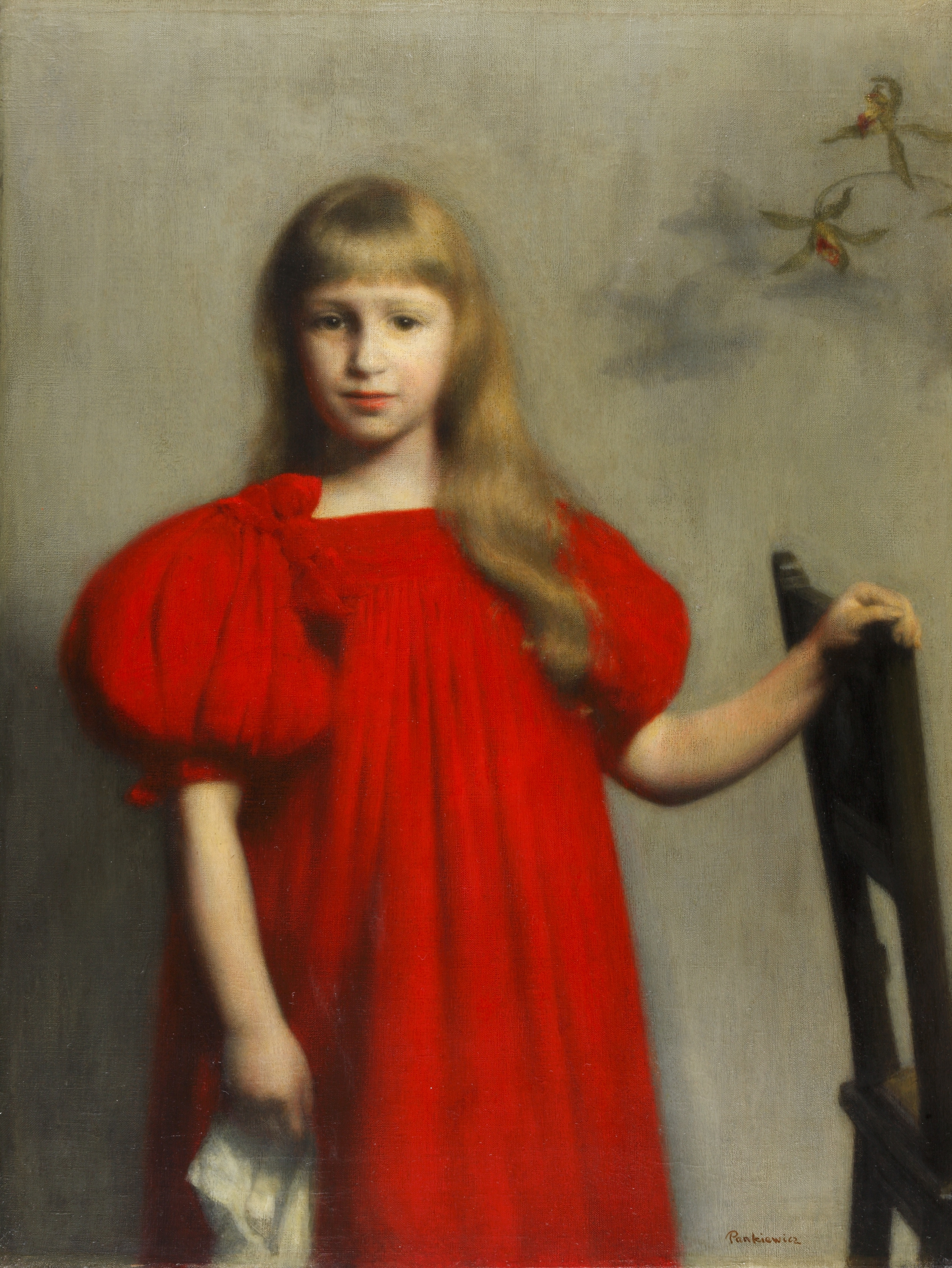

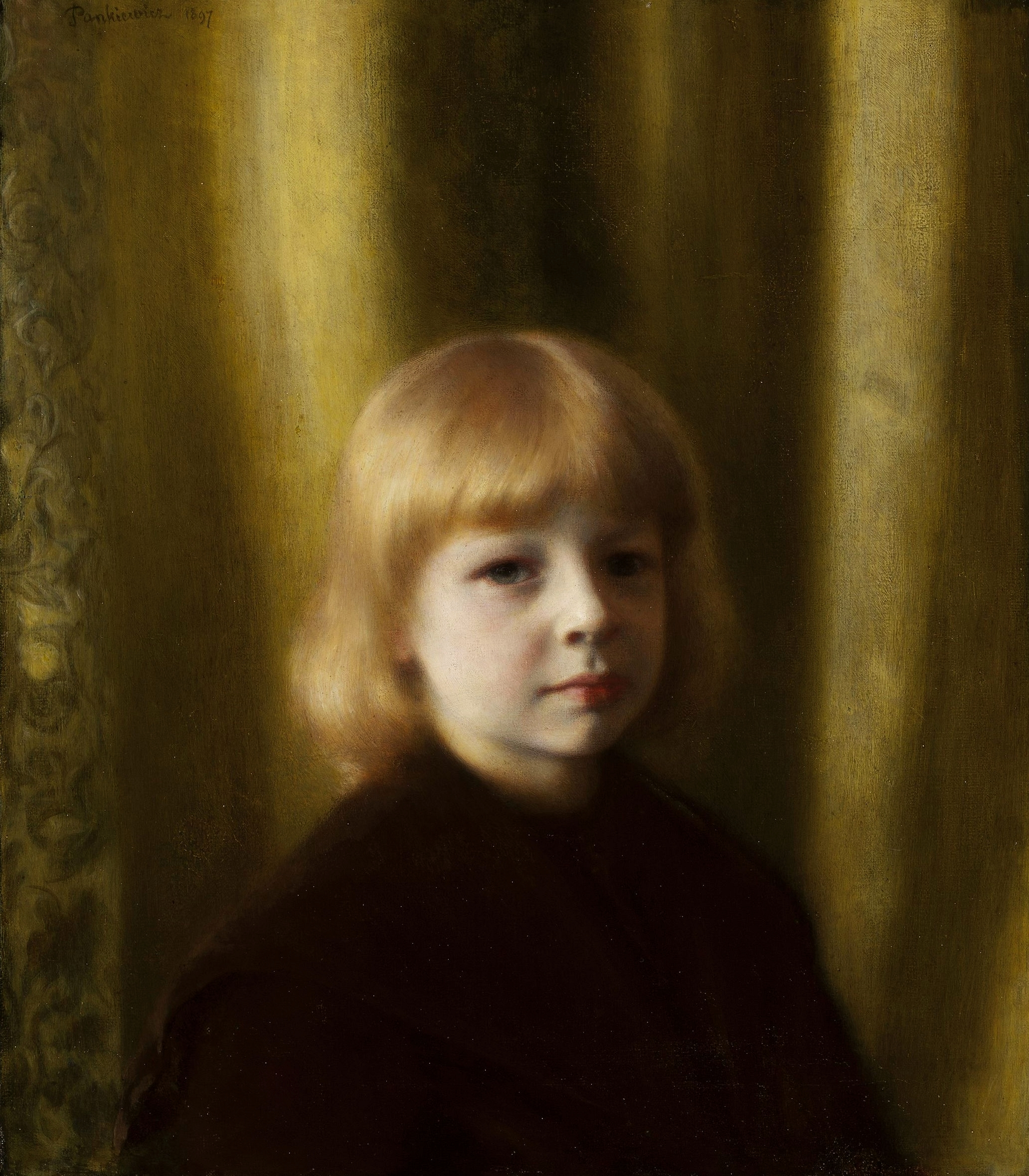

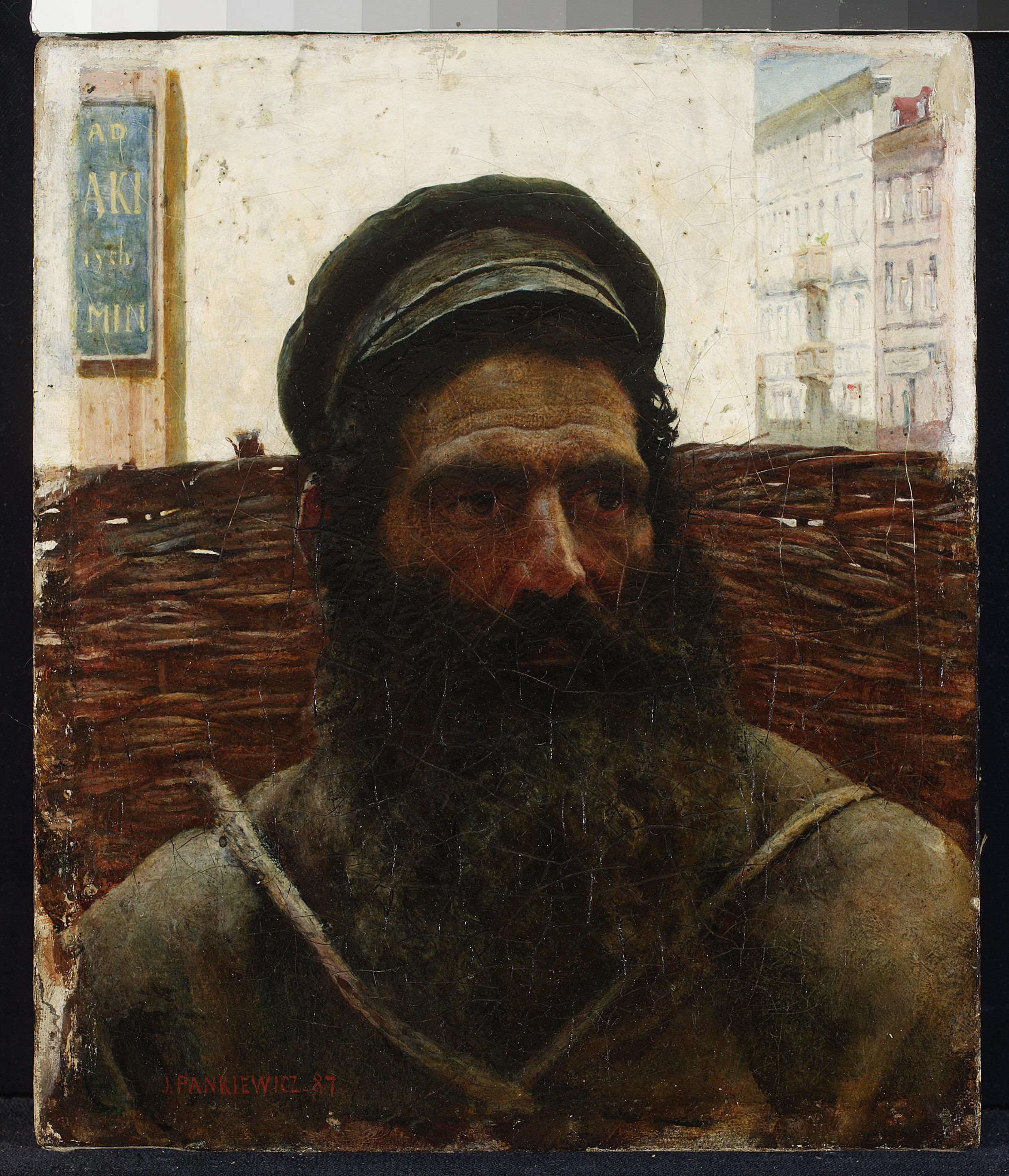

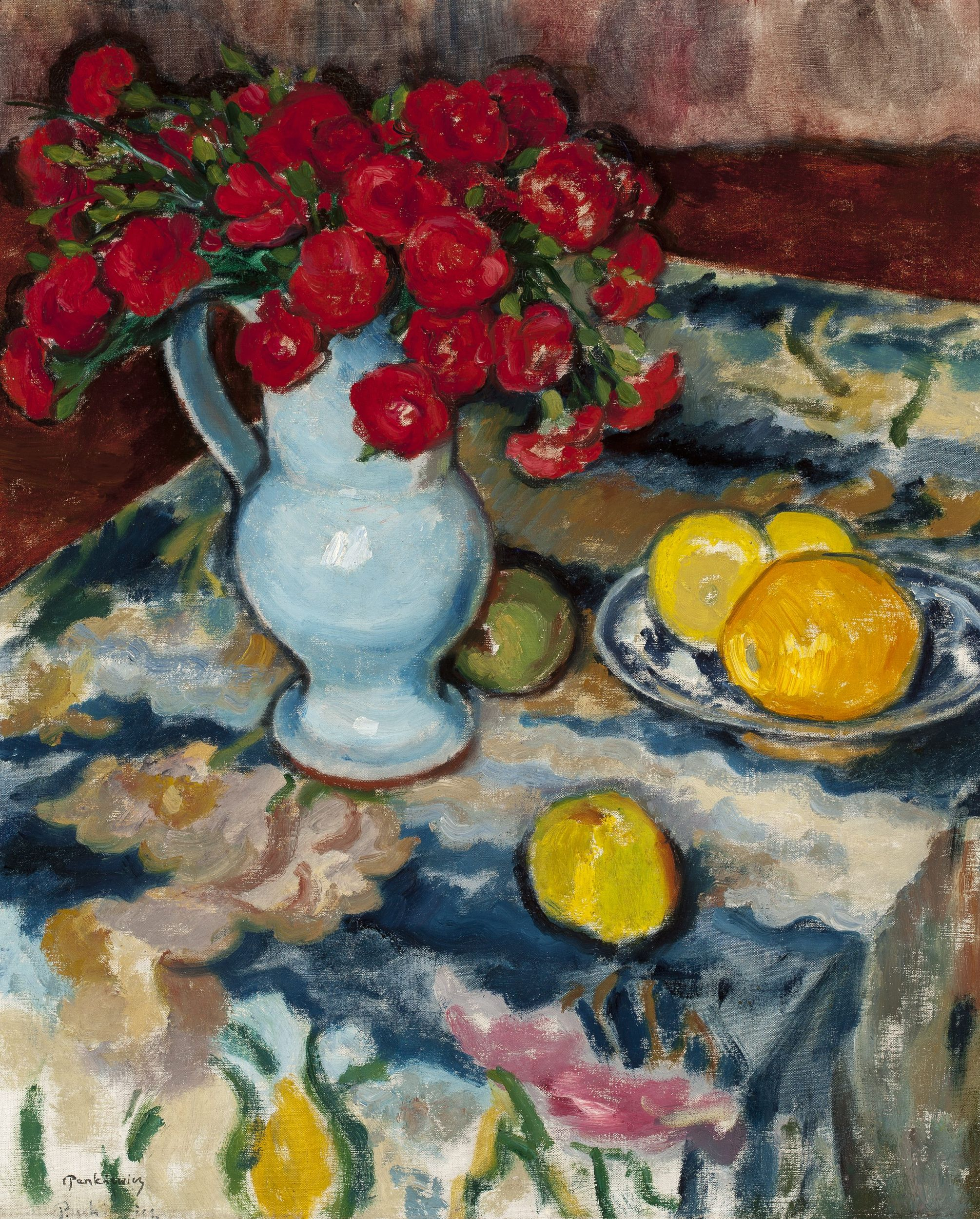

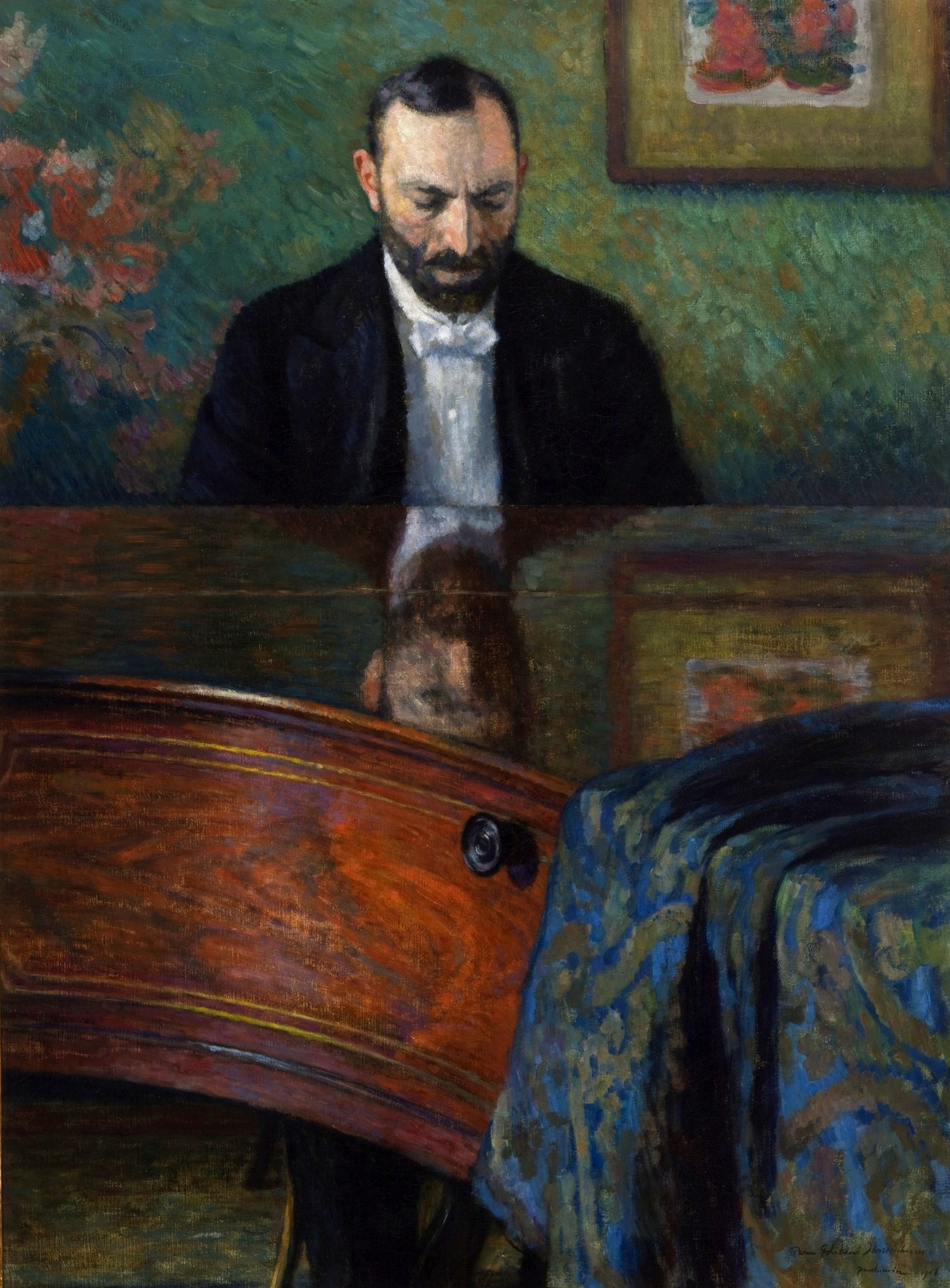

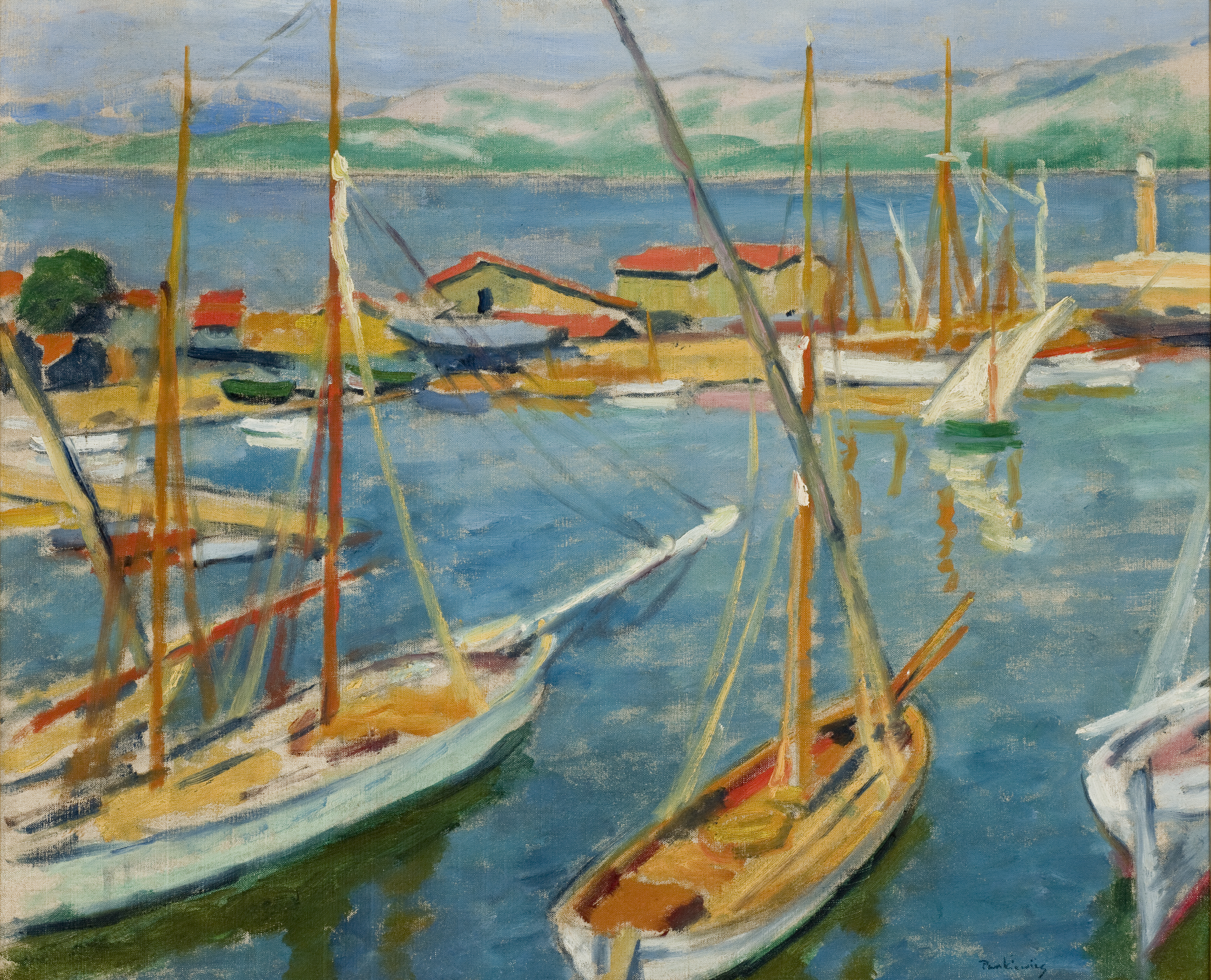

Post-impressionist realism was represented by the paintings of Władysław Ślewiński (1856-1918),

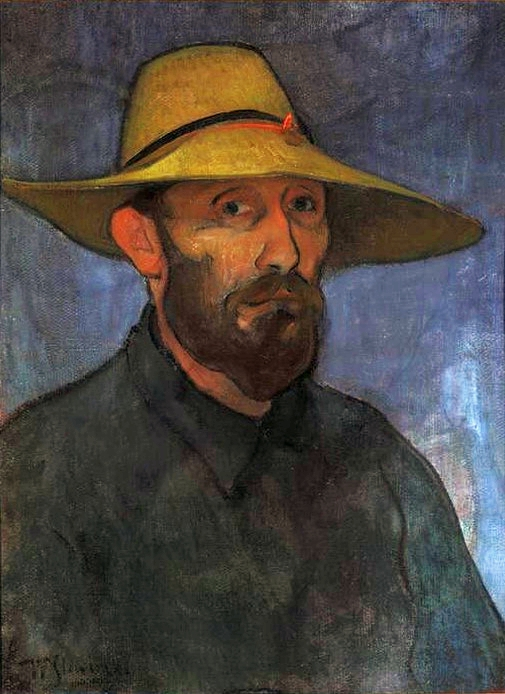

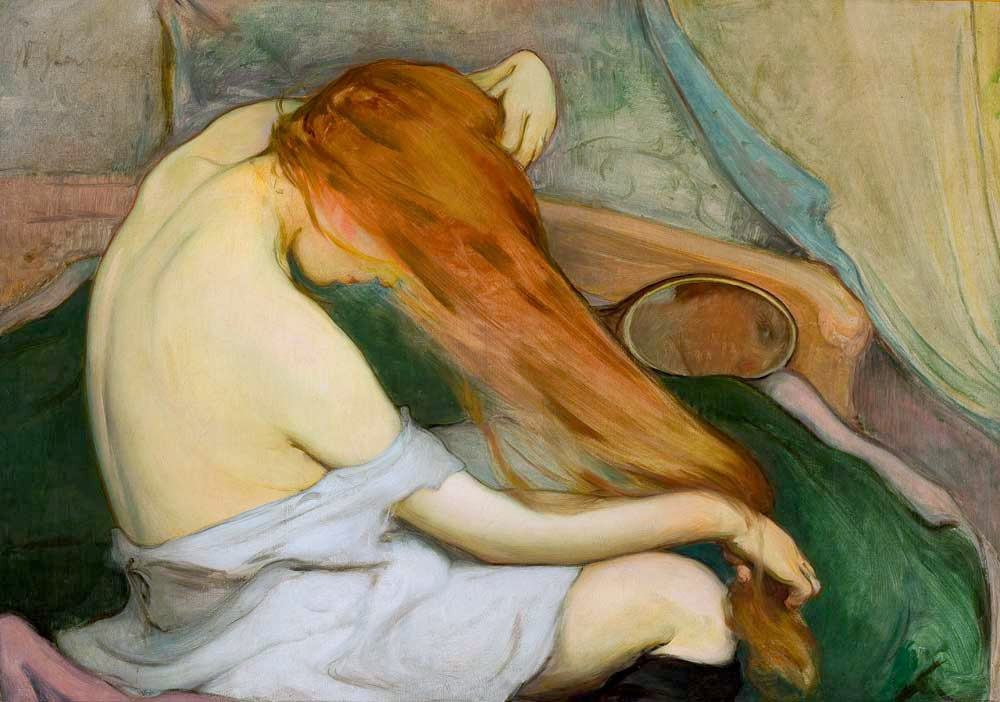

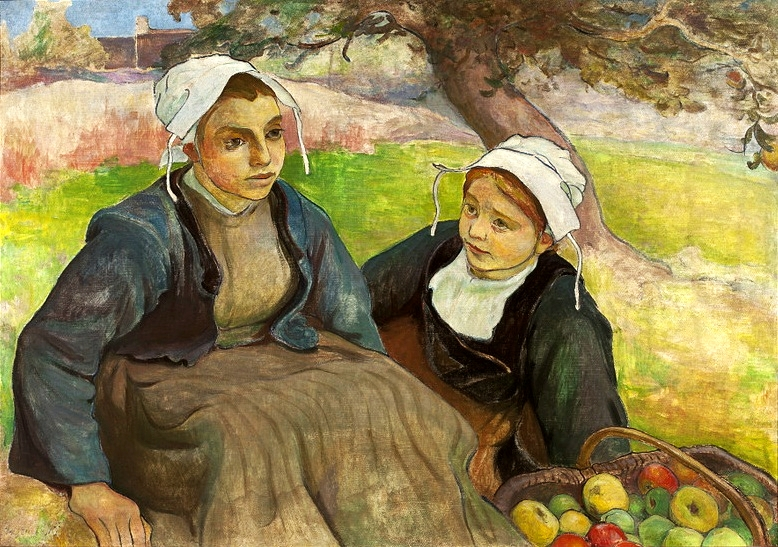

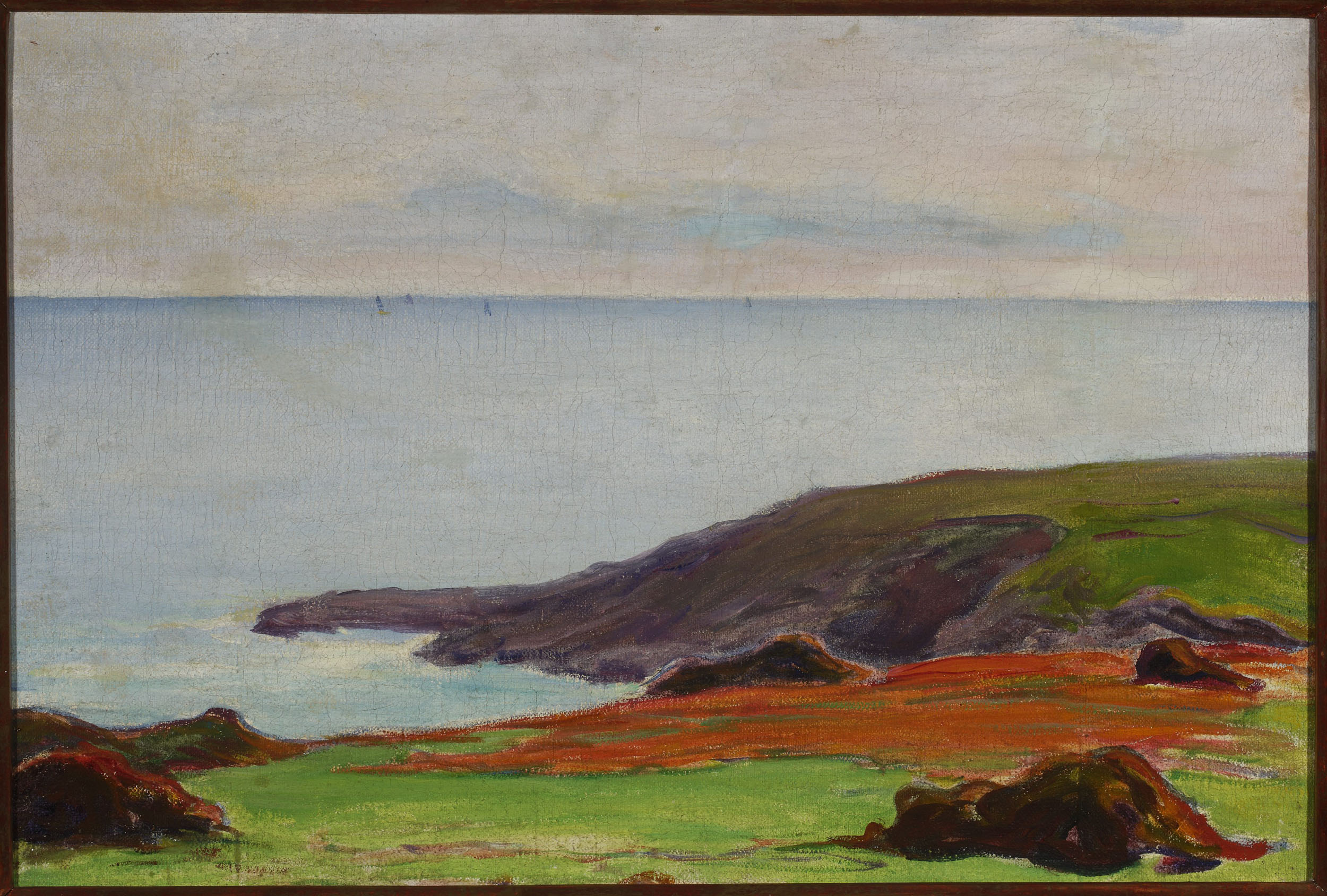

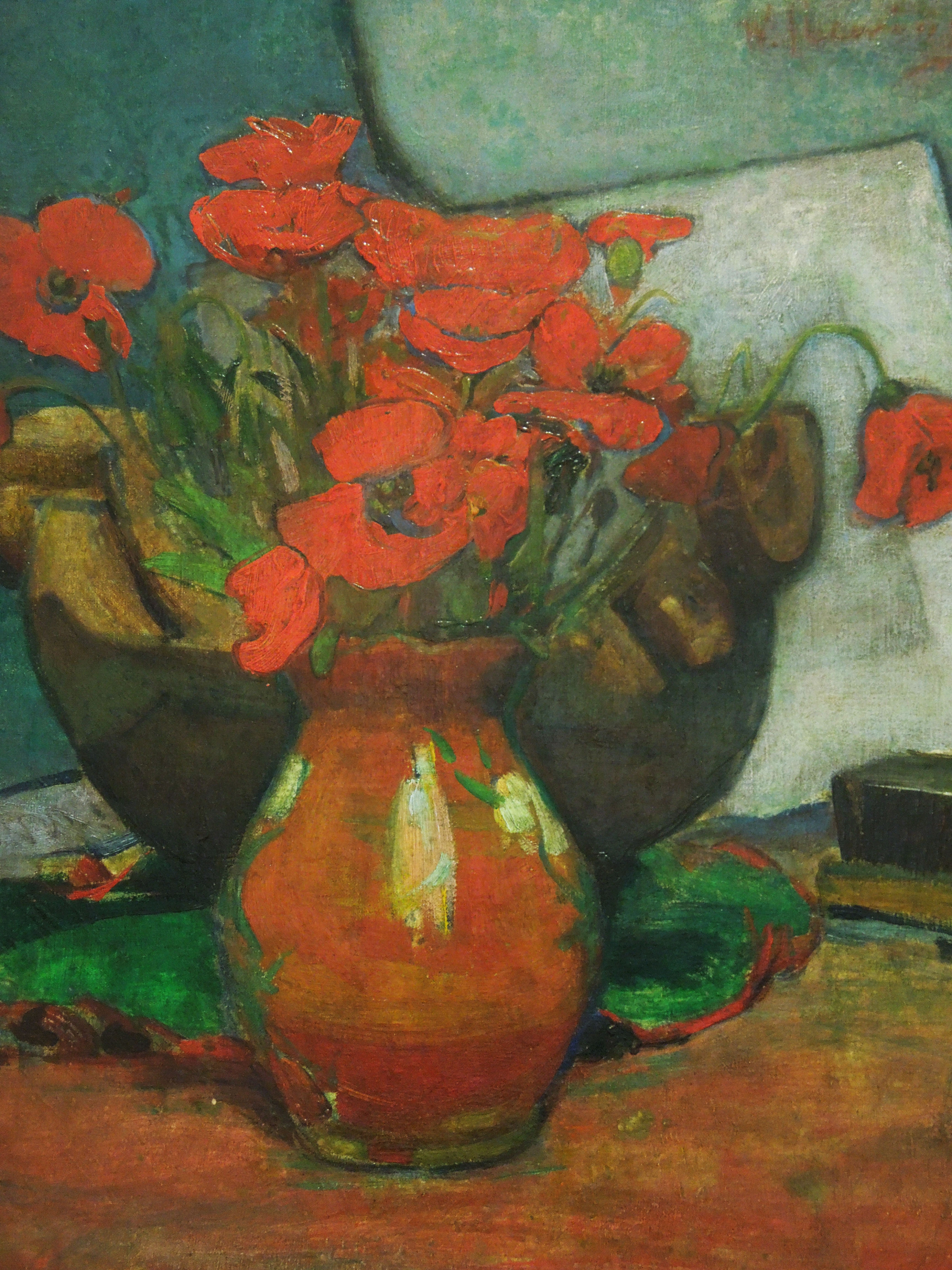

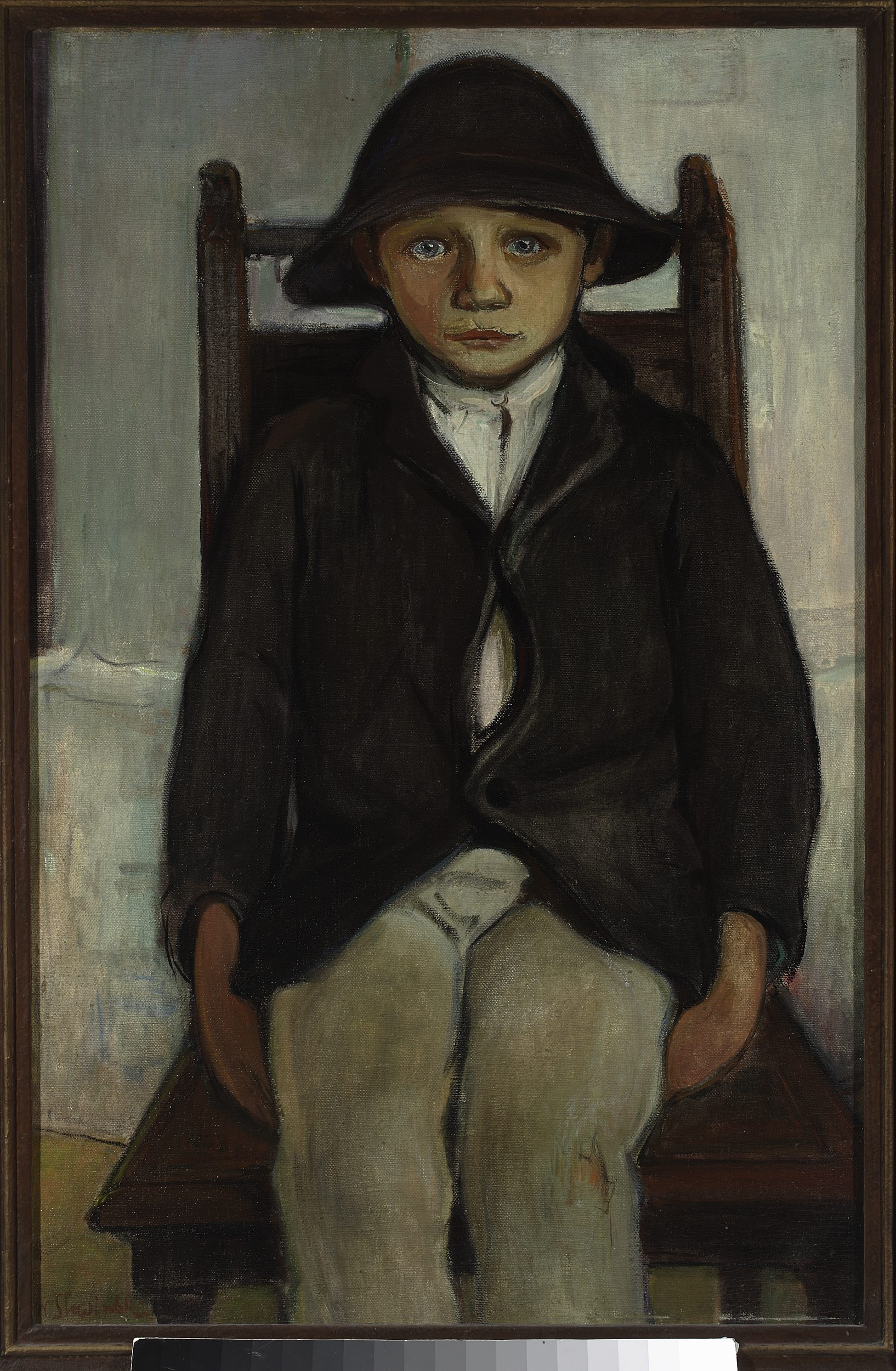

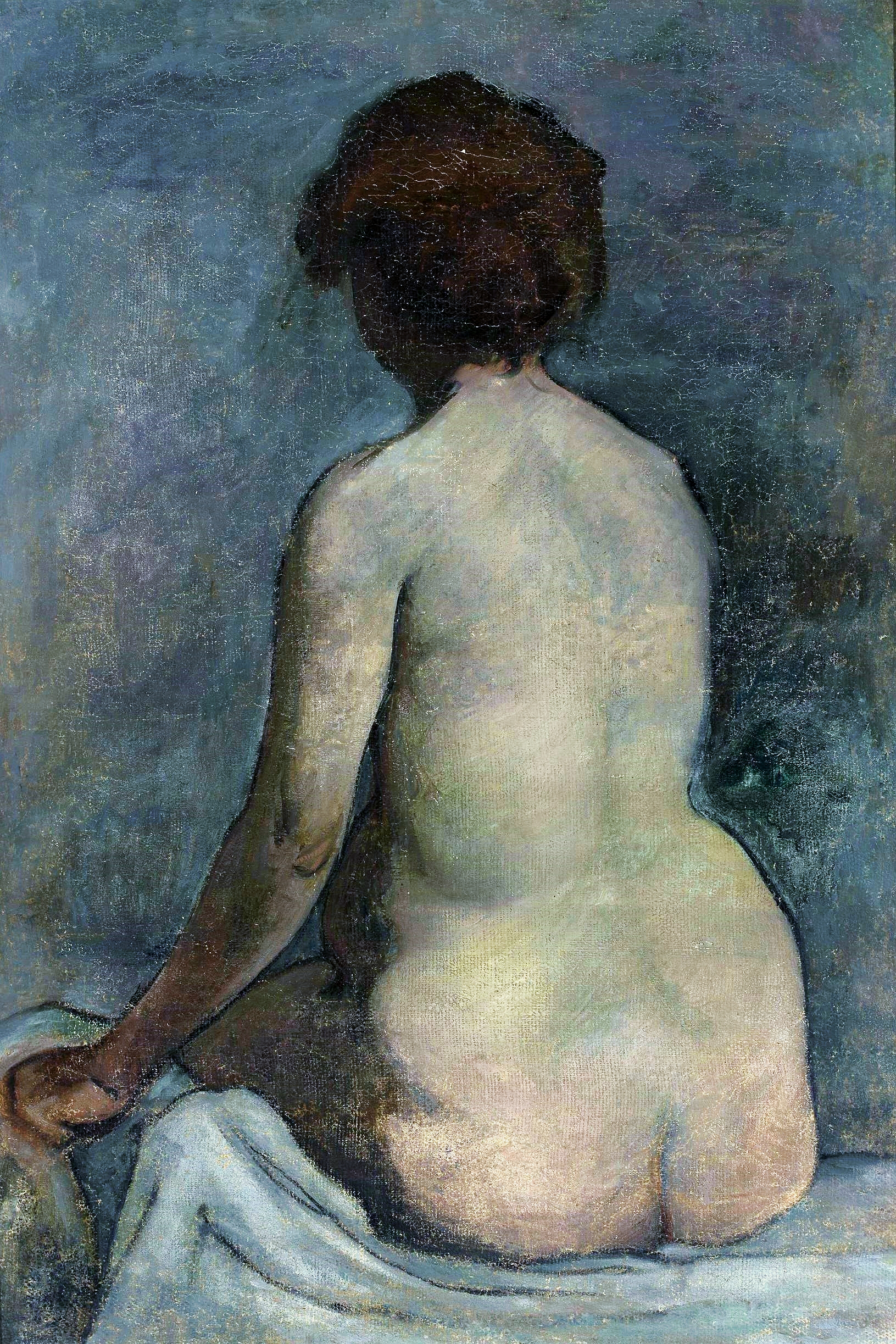

Leon Wyczółkowski (1852-1936),

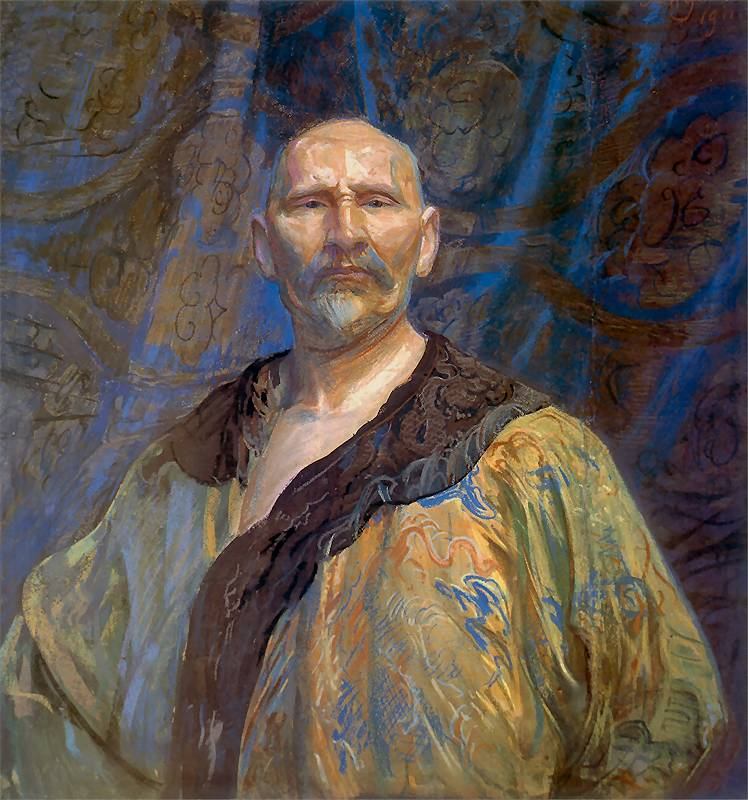

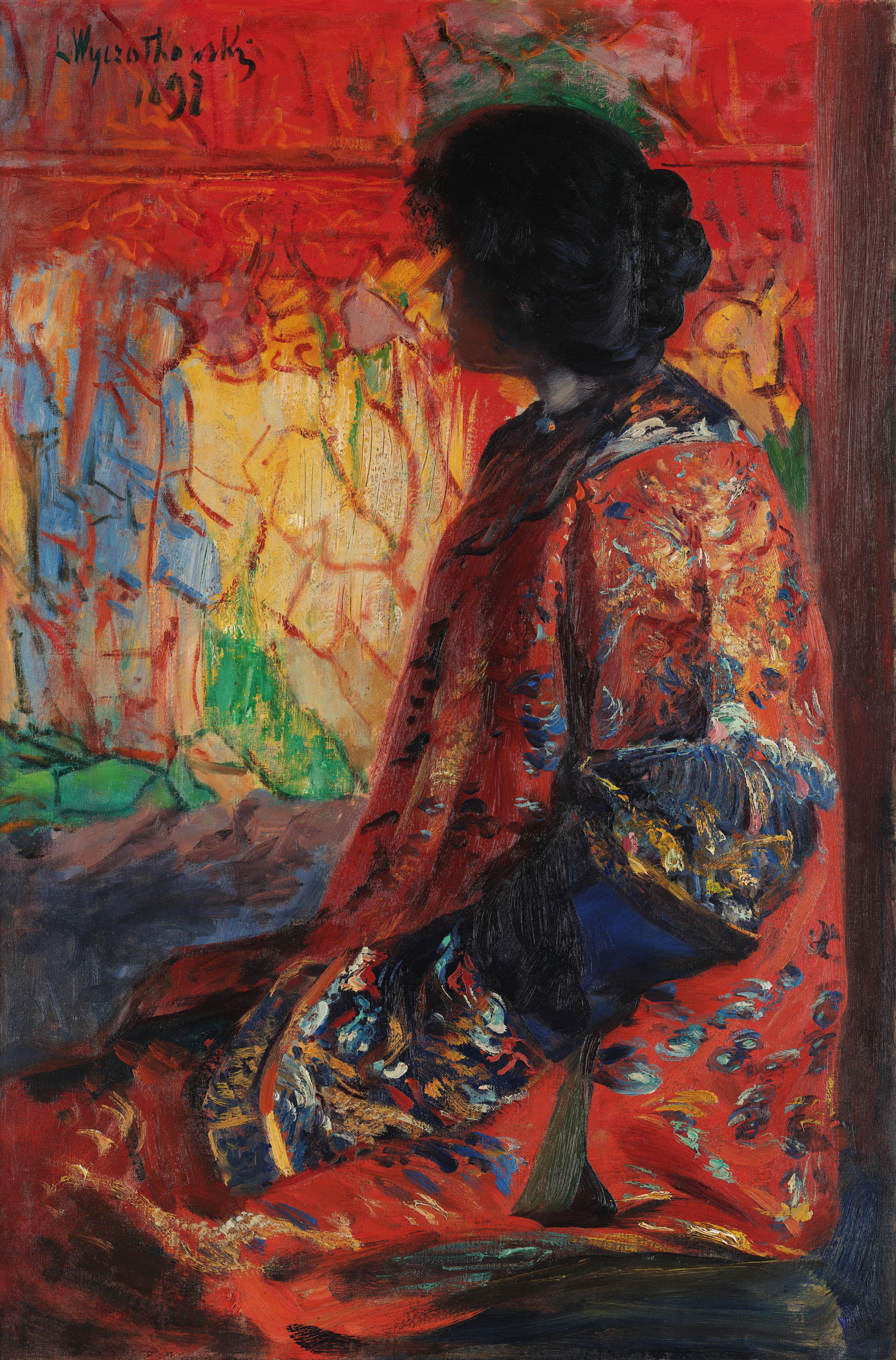

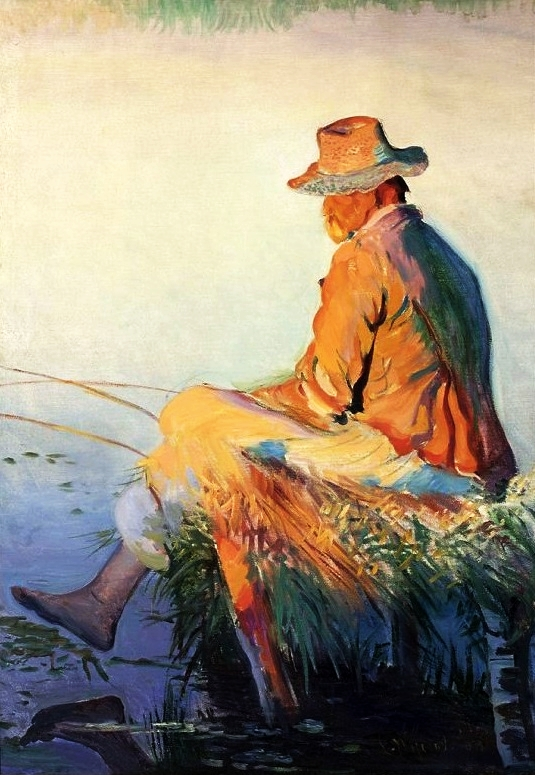

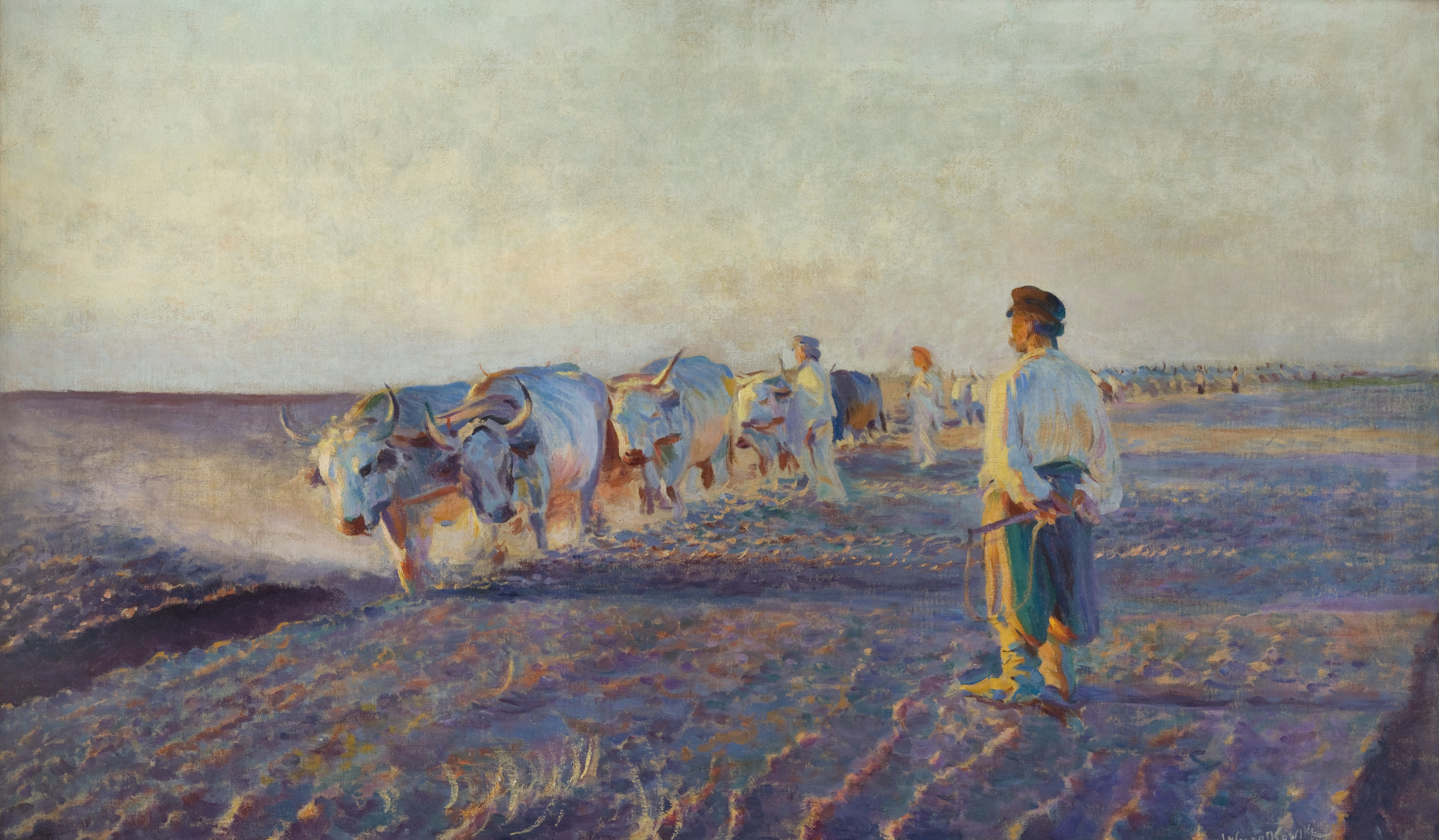

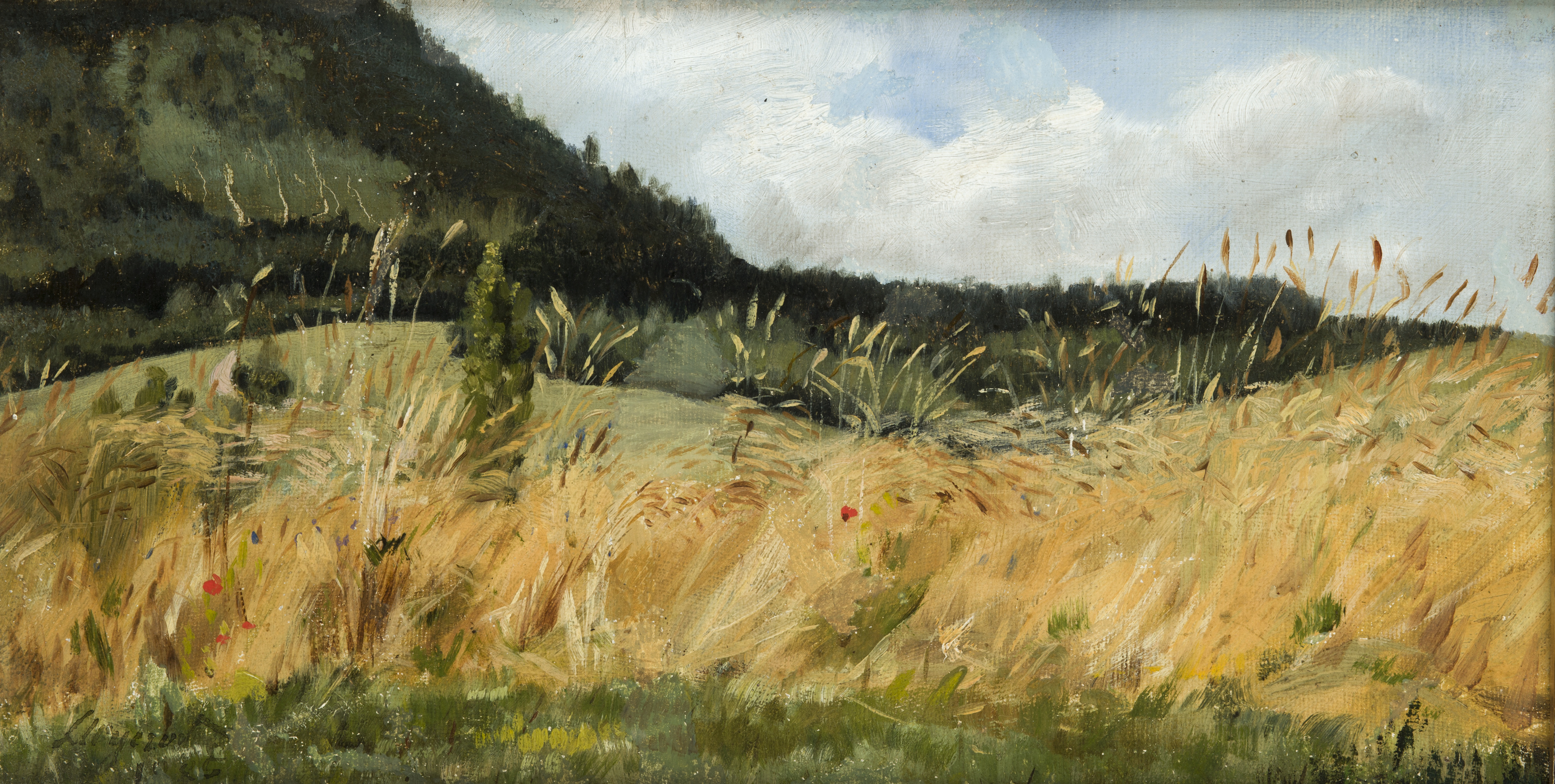

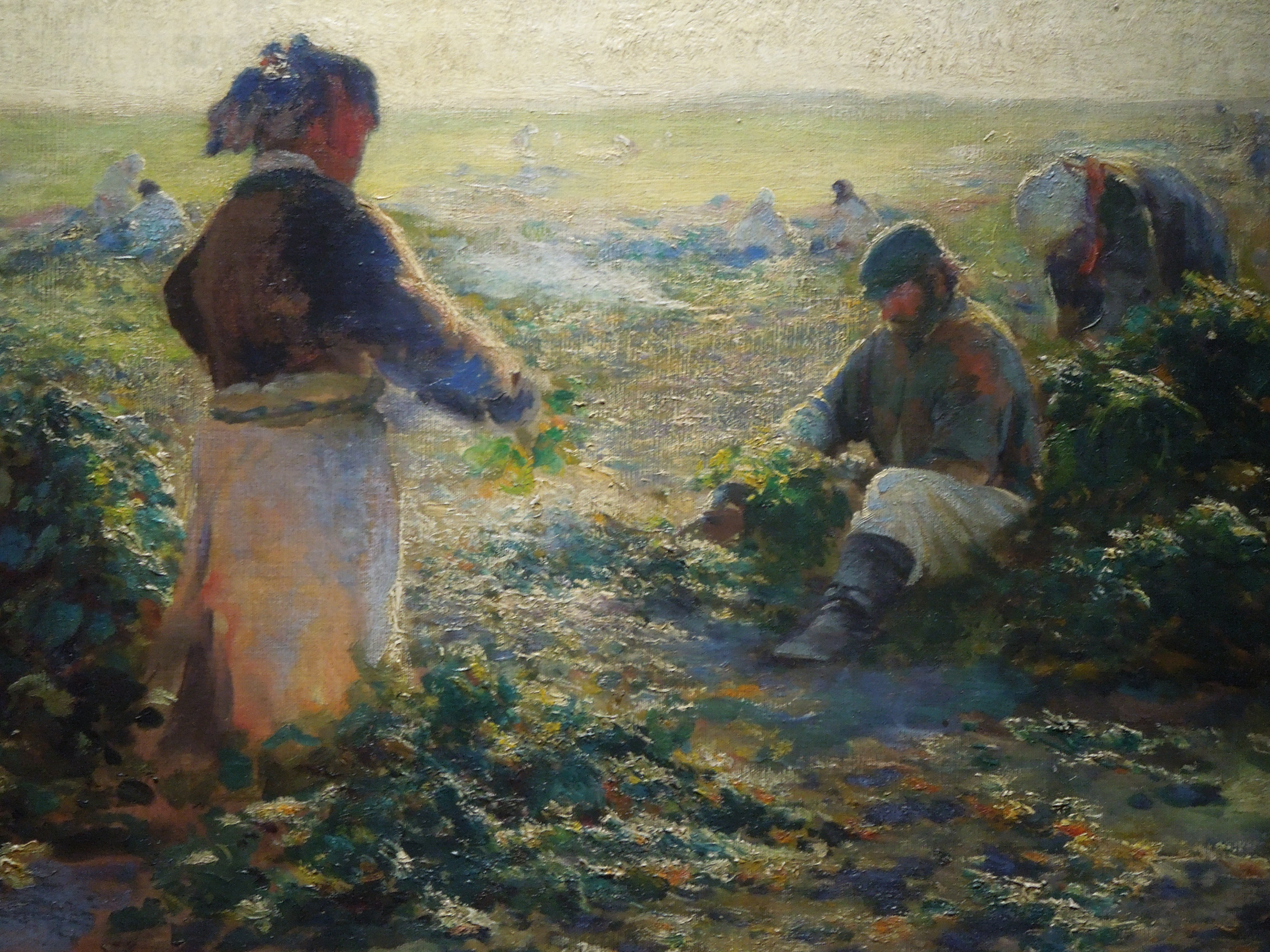

Ferdynand Ruszczyc (1870-1936),

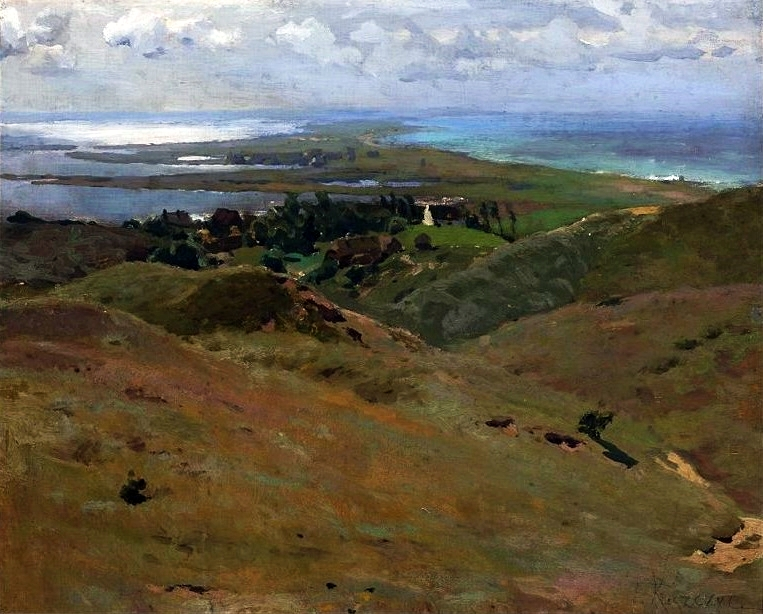

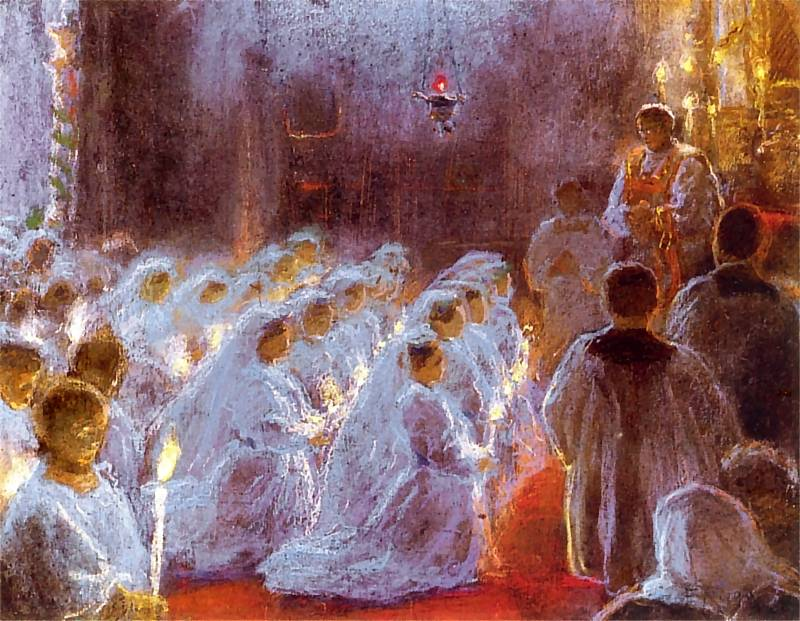

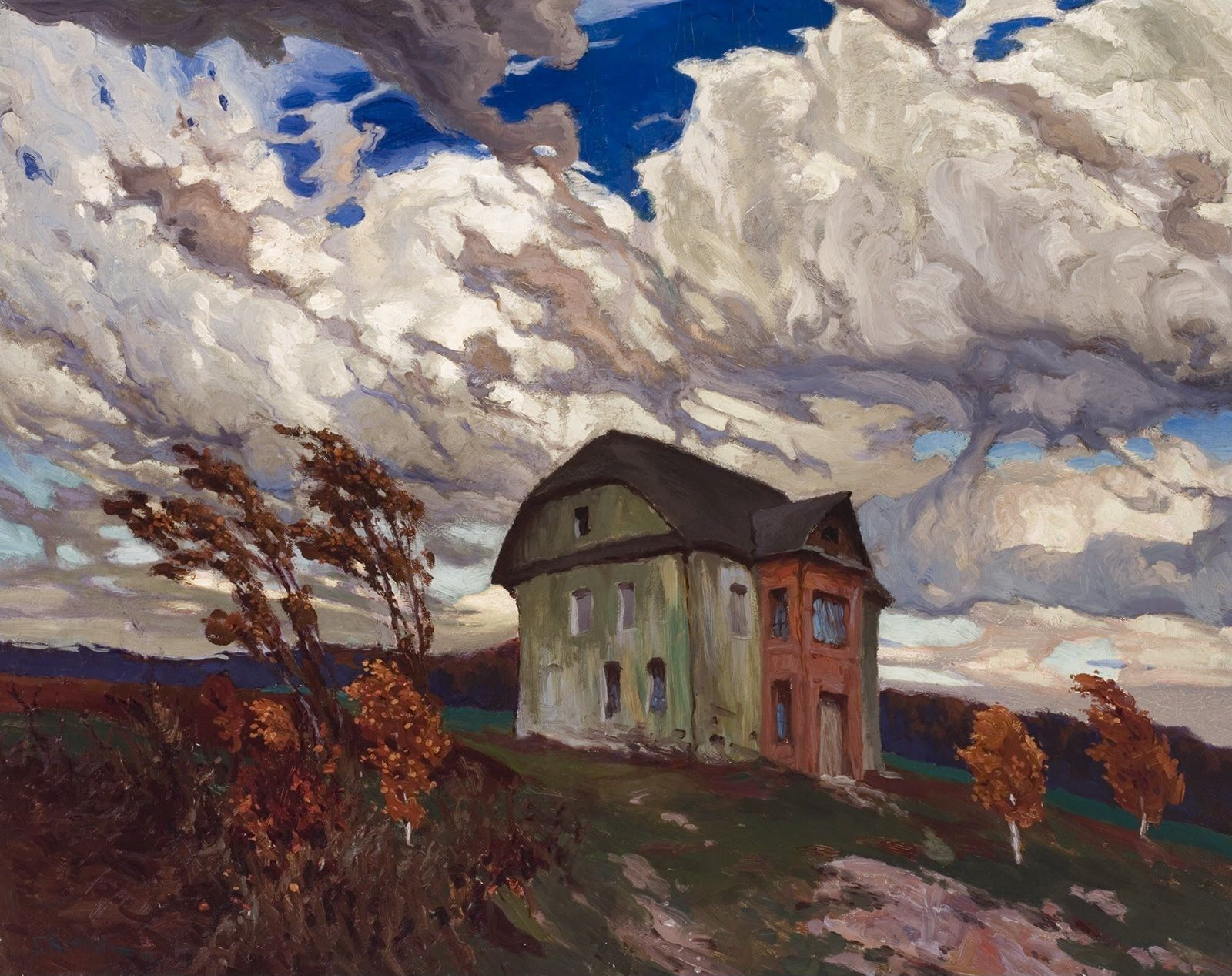

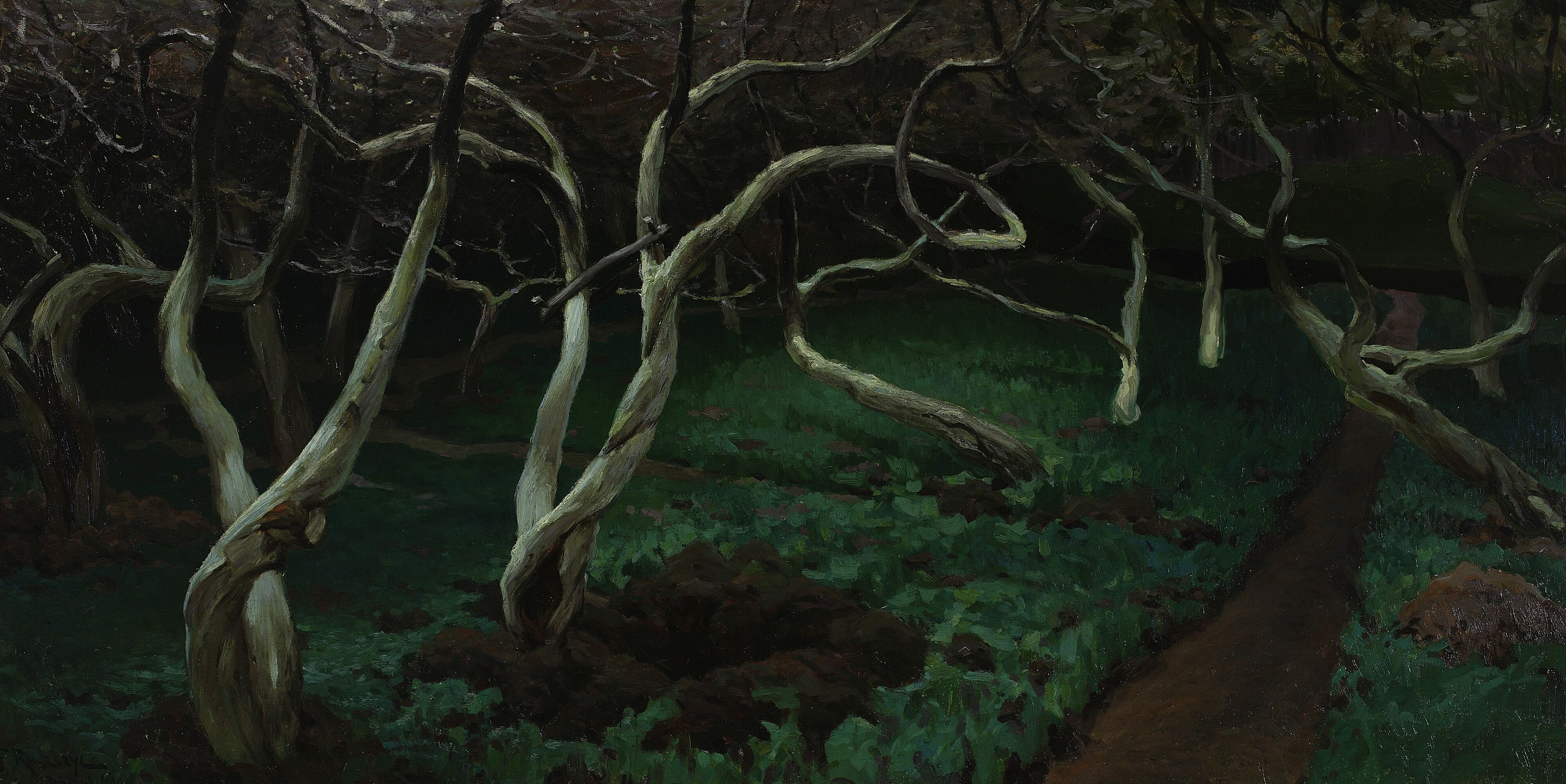

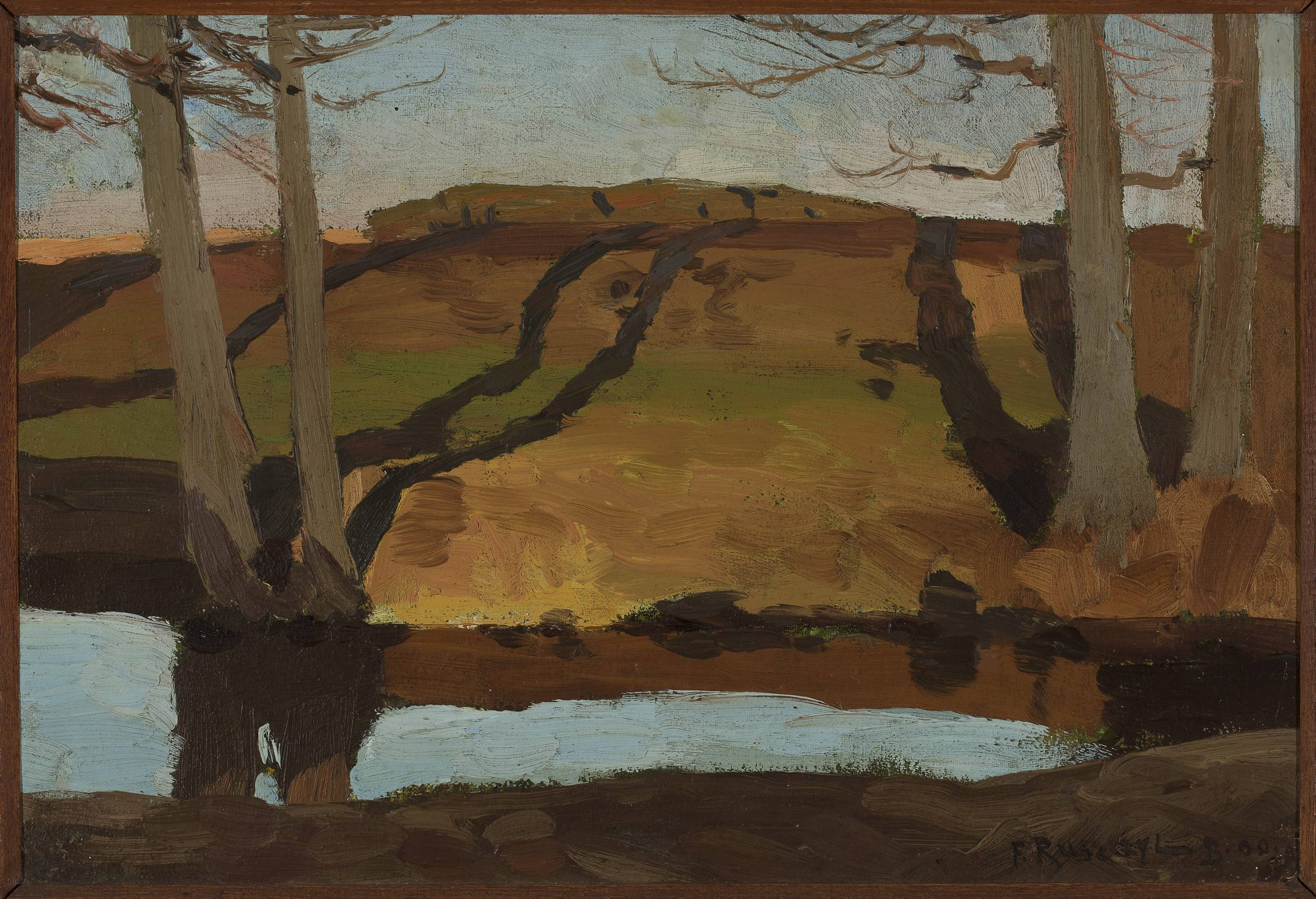

and Wojciech Weiss (1875-1950).

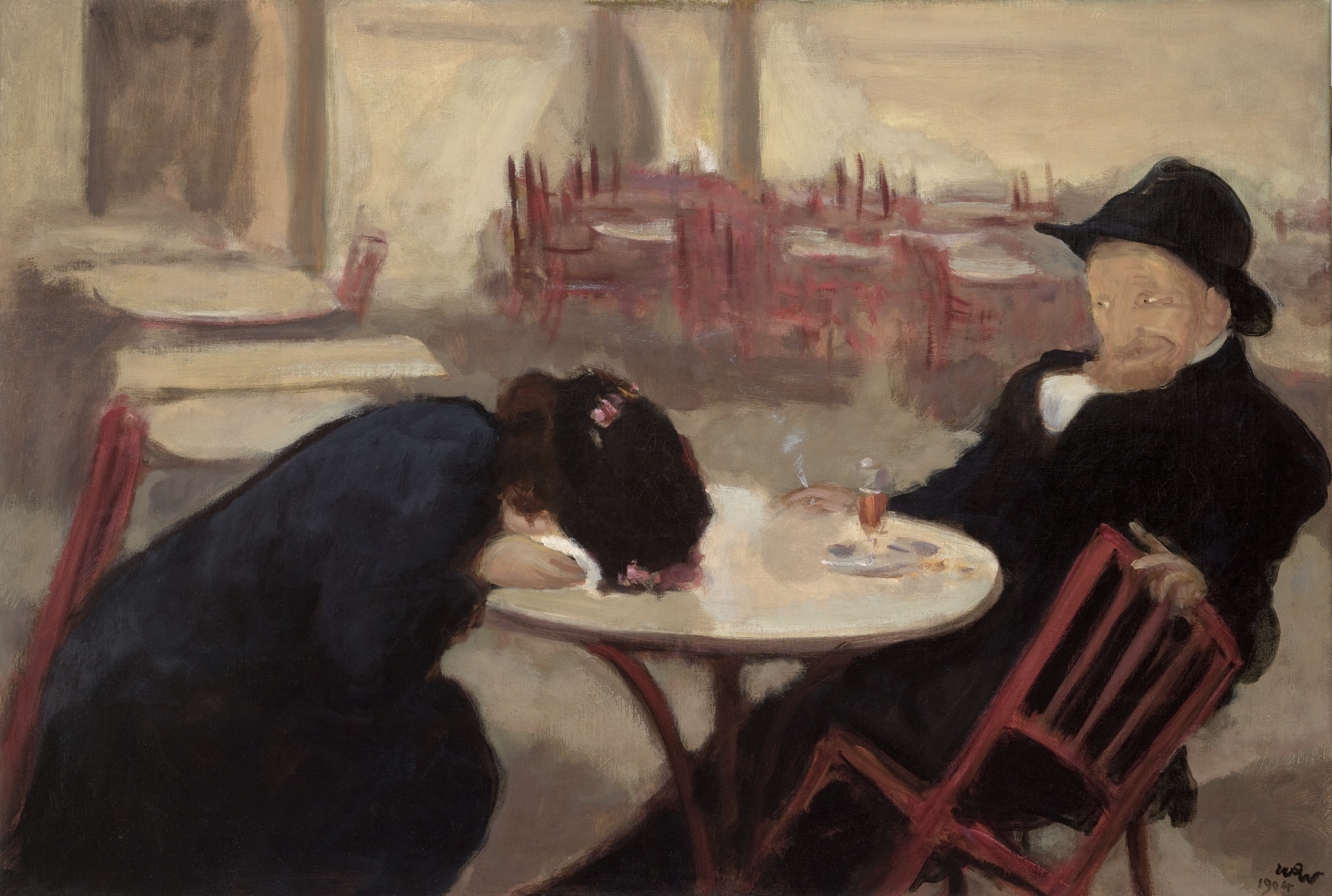

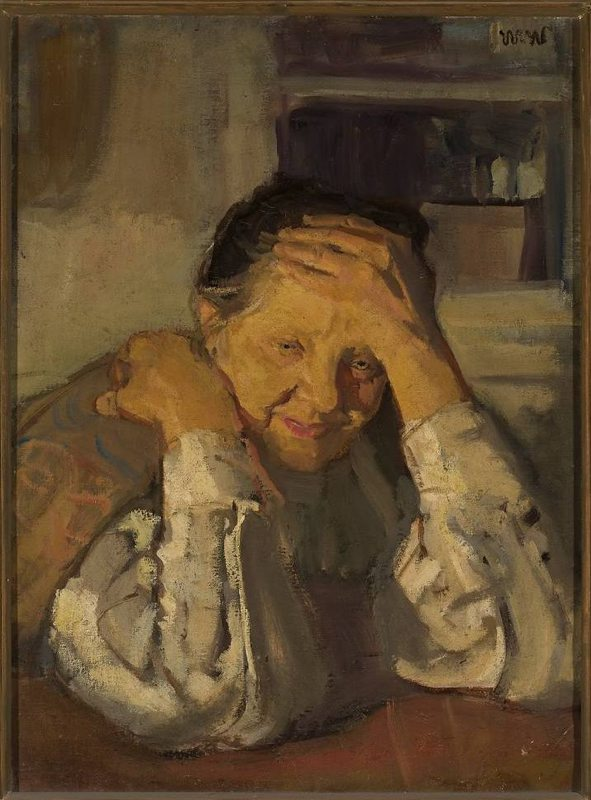

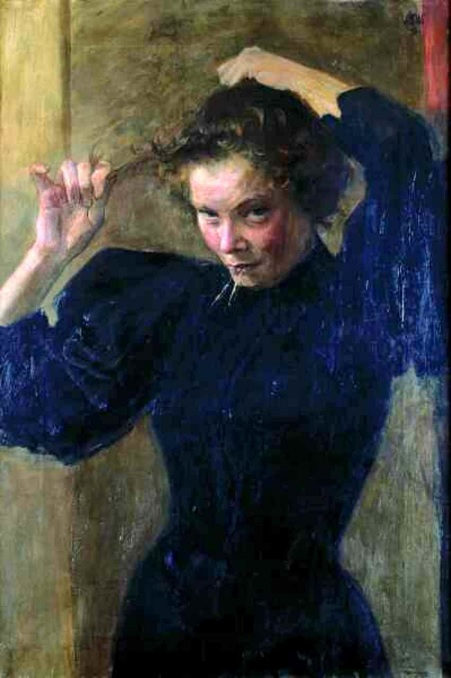

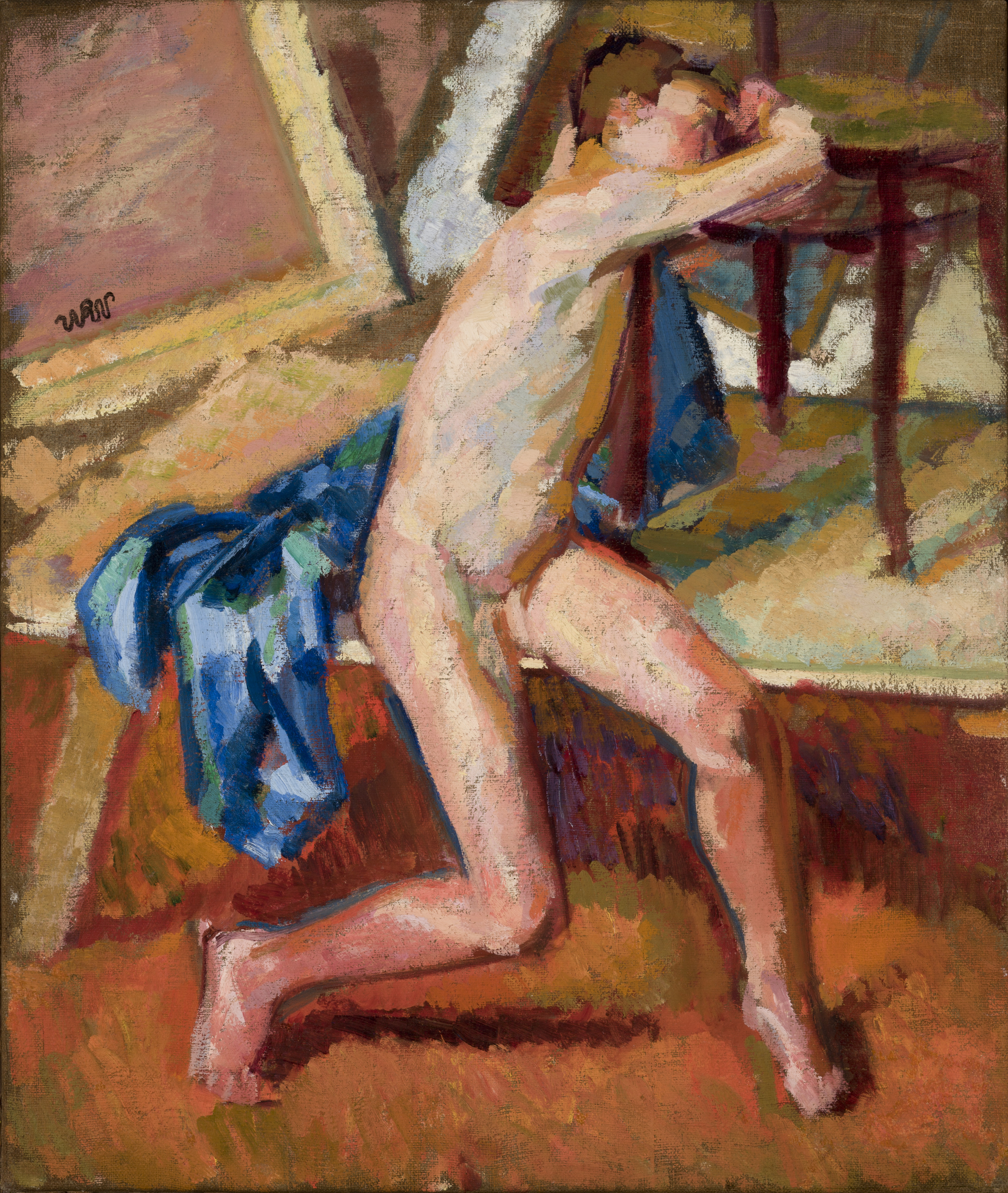

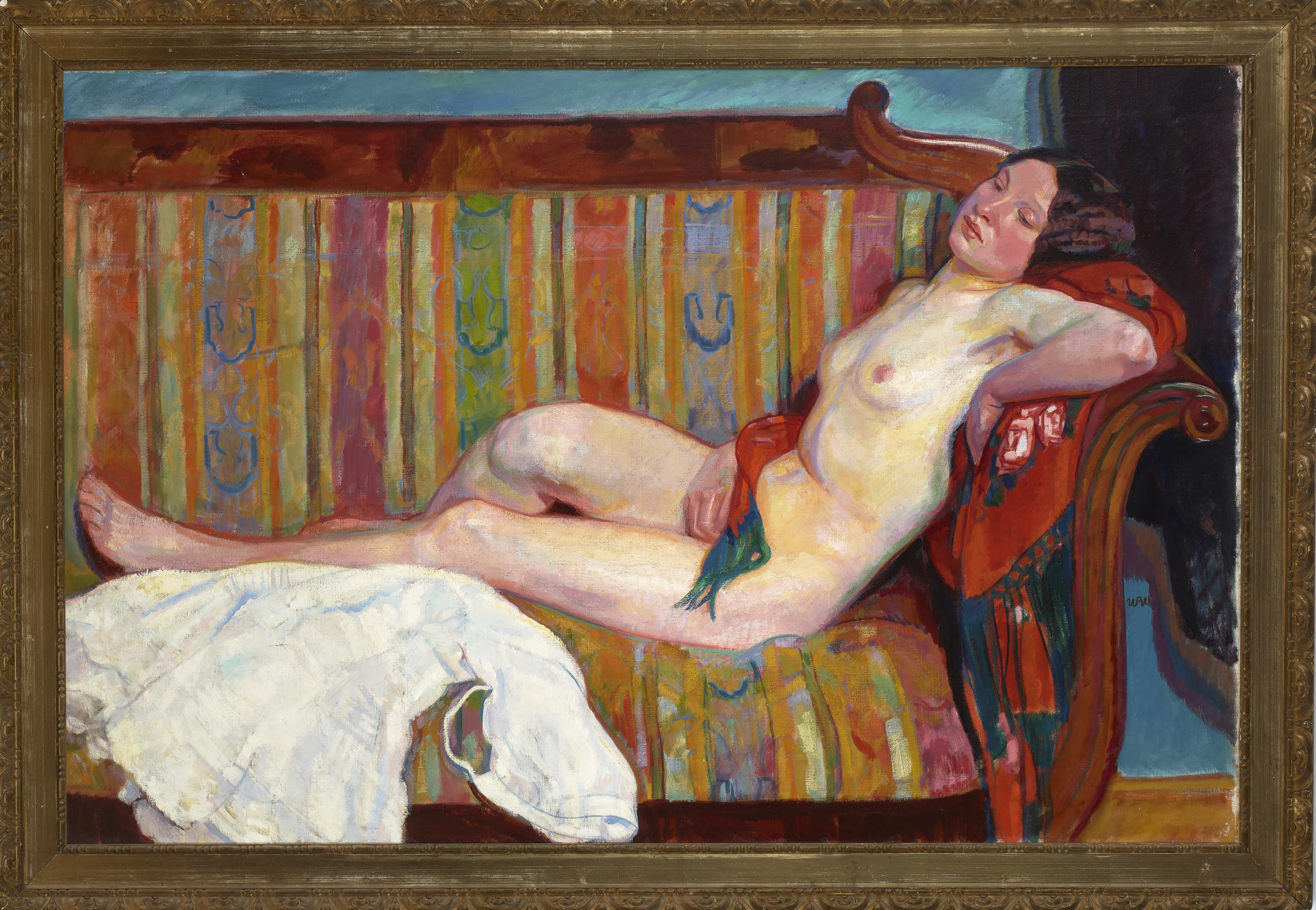

Witold Wojtkiewicz (1879-1909) et Konrad Krzyżanowski (1872-1922) represented the expressionist tendency.

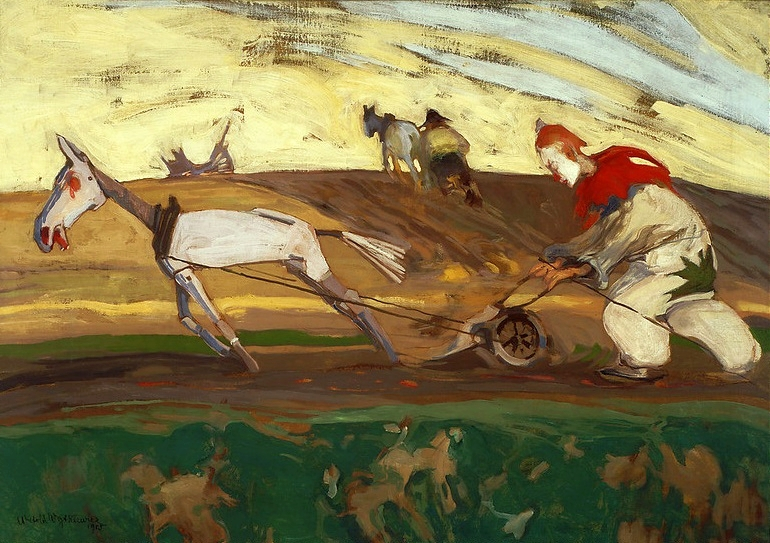

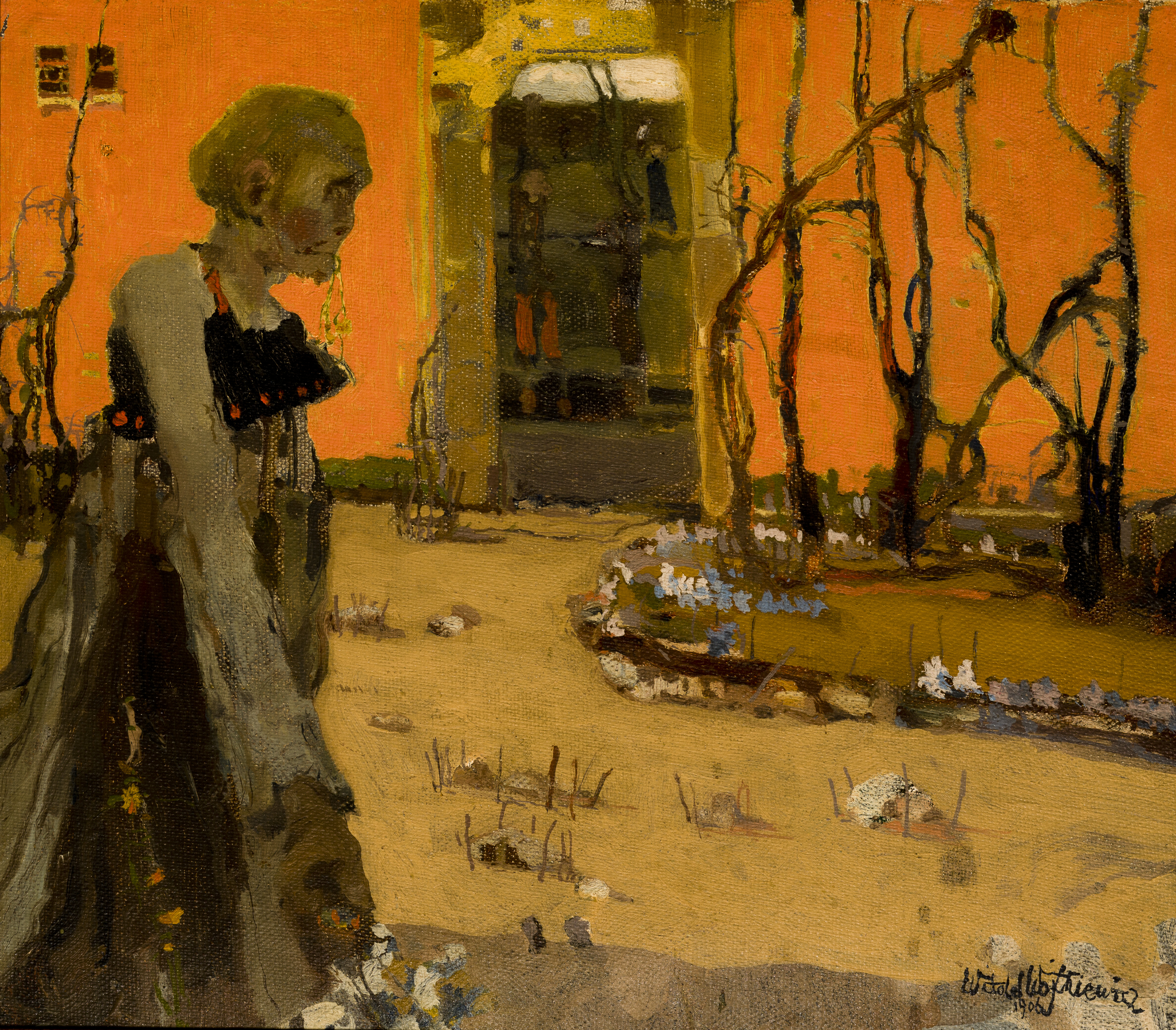

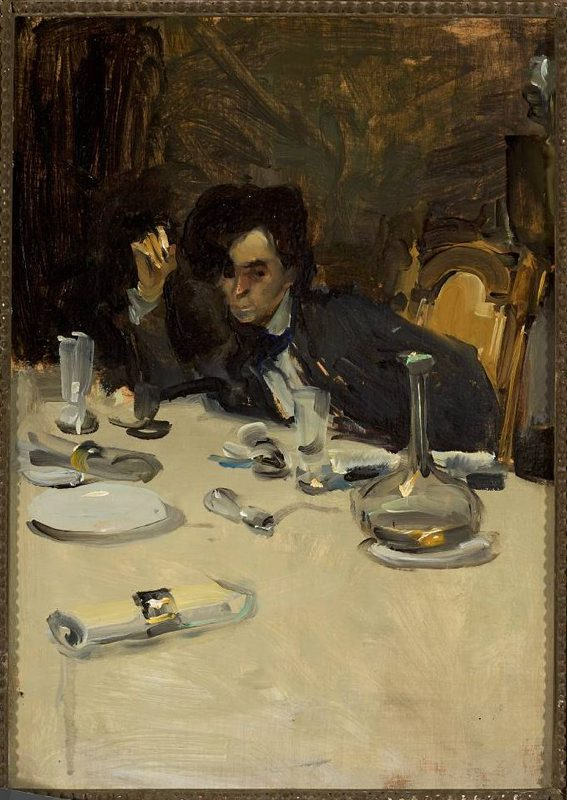

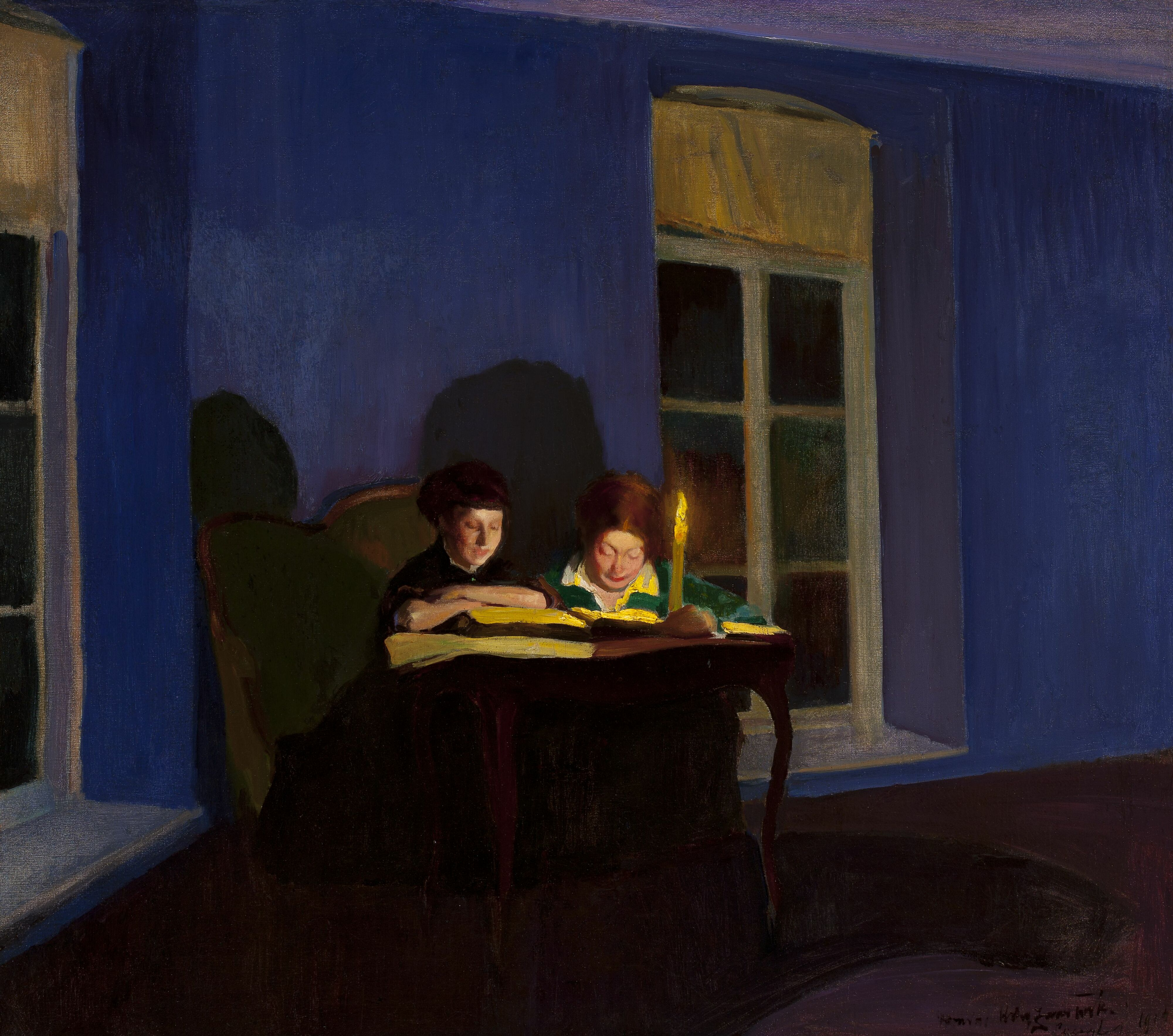

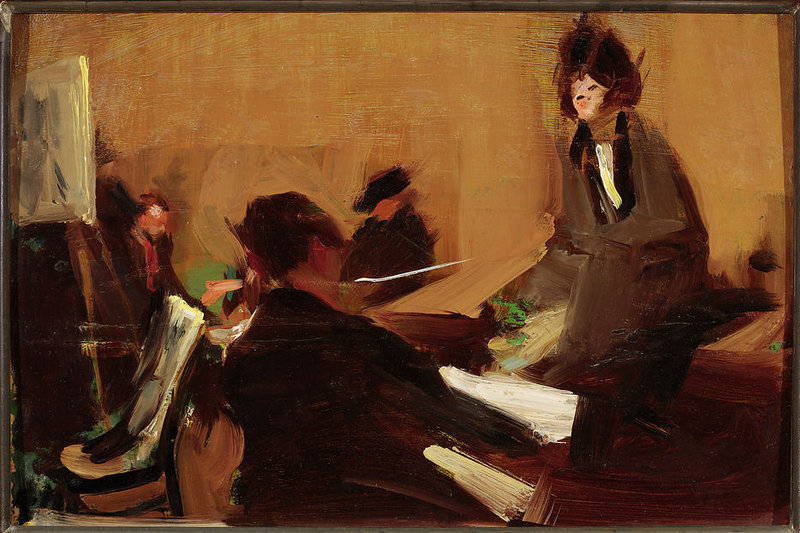

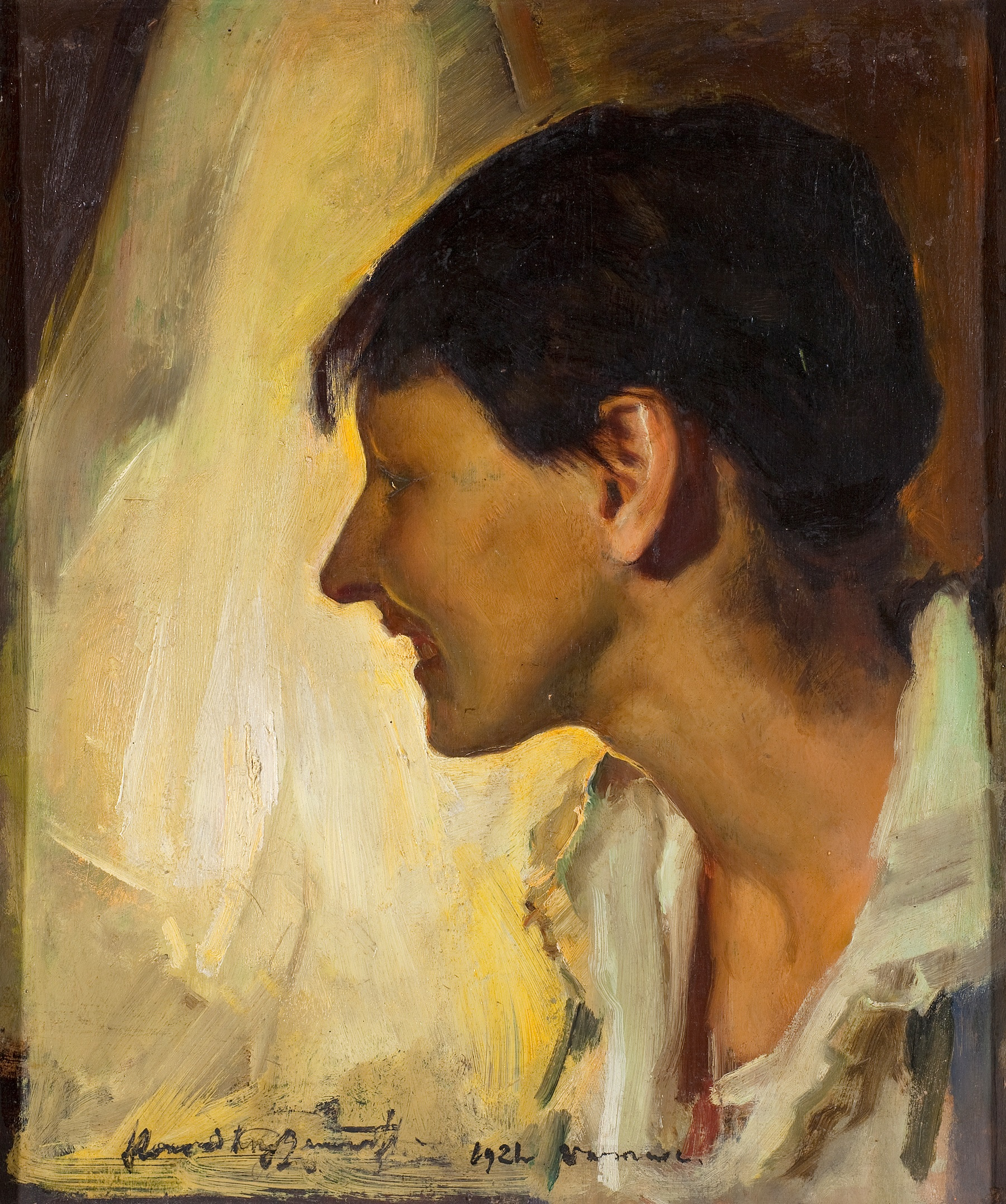

Other painters of this period include Stanisław Masłowski, Fryderyk Pautsch, Kazimierz Sichulski, Stanisław Dębicki, Wałdysław Jarocki, Edward Okuń, Włodzimierz Przerwa-Tetmajer and Jan Stanisławski.

== See also ==
- History of Poland (1795–1918)

== Notes and references ==
- Dobrowolski Tadeusz, Sztuka Młodej Polski, Warszawa 1963.
- Słownik artystów polskich i obcych w Polsce działających. Malarze, rzeźbiarze, graficy, t. II, Wrocław 1975 (Urszula Leszczyńska).
- Puciata-Pawłowska Joanna, Konstanty Laszczka, Siedlce 1980.
