= Kisielewski =

Kisielewski (feminine: Kisielewska) is a Polish surname and can refer to:

- Jan August Kisielewski (1876–1918), a Polish writer, brother of Zygmunt Kisielewski
- Jacek Junosza Kisielewski (born 1952), a Polish biologist and diplomat
- Józef Kisielewski (1905–1966), a Polish writer, journalist and politician
- Stefan Kisielewski (1911–1991), a Polish writer, publicist, composer and politician
- Wacław Kisielewski (1943–1986), a Polish pianist, son of Stefan Kisielewski
- Zygmunt Kisielewski (1882–1942), a Polish writer, brother of Jan August and father of Stefan

== See also ==
- Kisiel (Polish surname)
- Kysel, Kyselák (Czech surnames)
