= Kisiel =

Kisiel may refer to:

- Kissel, a European dessert known as kisiel in Poland
- Kisiel Prize, awarded annually by Polish weekly Wprost to publicists, politicians, and entrepreneurs

== People ==
- Adam Kisiel (1600 – 1653), Polish and Ukrainian politician
- Dominik Kisiel (born 1990), Polish footballer
- Jarosław Kisiel (born 1964), Polish fencer
- Karol Kisel (born 1977), Slovak footballer
- Krzysztof Kisiel (born 1969), Polish handball coach
- Shelby Kisiel (born 1994), American rhythmic gymnast
- Theodore Kisiel (1930–2021), American professor of philosophy

== See also ==
- Kisel (disambiguation)
- Kisielewski
