= Kisel =

Kisel may refer to:

- Gisel, a village in Iran
- Ivan Kisel (born 1998), Belarusian footballer
- Karol Kisel (born 1977), Slovak footballer
- Kissel, a Slavic dish

== See also ==
- Kisiel (disambiguation)
