= Anna May-Rychter =

German painter (1864–1955)

Anna May-Rychter (1864–1955) was an early 20th century German realist painter best remembered for her watercolors of the Holy Land.

== Life ==
May-Rychter was born in Regensburg, Bavaria, in 1864; the daughter of Henry von May, who held an appointment of personal physician for Prince of Thurn and Taxis. During her childhood, Karl Theodor, Duke in Bavaria brought the physician and his family to Munich, where she was educated by Catholic nuns and went on to study at the Academy of Fine Arts, Munich. There, Nikolaos Gyzis was one of her teachers.

Known unofficially as May-Rychter (May was Anna's maiden name), she was the long-term partner of Polish artist Tadeusz Rychter. The two did not marry because the Catholic Church did not recognize divorce and Tadeusz had been previously wed, to Cracovian artist Bronisława Janowska. According to Haaretz, social disapproval of their out-of-wedlock relationship was the reason why the couple left Europe and settled in Jerusalem. In 1939 Tadeusz traveled to Poland on a work assignment and died in Warsaw during World War II. May-Rychter continued to live in the Arabic-speaking neighborhoods of East Jerusalem until her death in 1955 at the age of 90.

In 2014 the Palestinian Heritage Foundation and The Jerusalem Fund sponsored an exhibition of May-Rychter's watercolors
