= Prosto z mostu =

Former Polish political magazine

- Editor: Stanisław Piasecki
- Frequency: Weekly
- Country: Second Polish Republic
- Language: Polish

Prosto z mostu (Polish pronunciation: [ˈprɔs.tɔ z ˈmɔs.tu], English: Straight Out) was a weekly magazine, which was published in Warsaw, Second Polish Republic, from 1935 until 1939. Its editor in chief was Stanisław Piasecki, and the magazine was strongly associated with radical right-wing movement National Radical Camp (ONR). In 1931–1935, Prosto z mostu was published as a Sunday supplement to the ABC daily, associated with the ONR.

Prosto z mostu presented the works of leading right-wing publicists of Poland in the late 1930s. Among most notable publicists who were associated with the magazine were Jan Mosdorf, Adam Doboszynski, Jan Dobraczyński, Józef Kisielewski, Alfred Laszowski, Adolf Nowaczynski, Karol Zbyszewski and Jerzy Zdziechowski. Furthermore, the magazine occasionally featured the works of Jerzy Andrzejewski, Konstanty Ildefons Gałczyński and Boleslaw Micinski. As in the late 1930s it became more radical, some writers decided to break their ties with it (Karol Irzykowski, Boleslaw Micinski). Prosto z mostu often published provocative, aggressive articles, and was conflicted with the literary group Skamander. Furthermore, the Sanation government frequently confiscated the copies of the magazine, due to radical right-wing contents and criticism of the government. It also featured antisemitic articles

While the publication was heavily antisemitic and opposed to presence of Jews in Poland, at the same time it supported alliance with Zionist movement and creation of Jewish state in Palestine, to create an emigration destination for Polish Jews. Zionists were defined as "Jews with national pride and dignity" and the attempt to create a Jewish state as "natural, healthy national Jewish desires .The nostalgia for own state and evacuation from foreign countries".

== See also ==
- List of magazines in Poland
