= Erica O'Donnell =

Irish art historian

Erica O'Donnell MBE
- Born: Erica Marie-Josèphe O'Donnell; 11 March 1920; Dublin, Ireland
- Died: 12 March 1999 (aged 79); London, UK
- Other names: Erica Kisielewski; Erica Marie-Josèphe Kisielewski
- Occupations: Art historian; SOE officer
- Known for: Founder and director of the Study Centre for the History of the Fine and Decorative Arts
- Spouse: Józef Kisielewski (m. 1958; died 1966)
- Children: 2

Erica Marie-Josèphe O'Donnell MBE (married name Kisielewski; 11 March 1920 – 12 March 1999) was an Irish art historian and SOE officer. In 1964, O'Donnell founded the Study Centre for the History of the Fine and Decorative Arts and served as the inaugural director until 1990.

== Early life and education ==
O'Donnell was born Erica Marie-Josèphe O'Donnell on 11 March 1920 in Dublin to Eric Hugh O'Donnell, a British army officer, and Mary Mabel Elizabeth O'Donnell (née Dunbar). O'Donnell attended St. Mary's Convent in Ascot, Berkshire from 1929 to 1935, going on to study the history of art, entering the Courtauld Institute in 1937. She travelled during her studies, living in Paris and Salzburg, and travelling to Germany. She returned to England after the outbreak of World War II. As she was fluent in German and French, she was hired as part of the BBC's overseas service in Evesham.

== Work during World War II ==
O'Donnell was recruited by MI5 due to her multilingualism and knowledge of Europe. She was appointed to the Special Operations Executive (SOE) in September 1940 to work in the headquarters of the Czech section, and given the rank of officer. Here she was in charge of training Czech agents, as well as liaising with officials in the Ministry of Economic Warfare and the Political Warfare Executive. She was transferred to the French section in March 1944, going on to work with the headquarters of the French Forces of the Interior. Her obituary in The Times claimed she parachuted into German-occupied territory, but this is not corroborated by her official SOE file. She left the SOE in December 1944 to work with the Red Cross, caring for survivors of concentration camps.

== Later career ==
She went on to work in the British embassy in Paris after the war. She then returned to England in 1948 to resume her studies with the Courtauld Institute. O'Donnell became a member of the Special Forces Club in London, counting among her friends numerous prominent immigrants including, Rudolf Wittkower, Ernst Gombrich, and Johannes Wilde. She helped Anthony Blunt with cataloguing the Stefano Della Bella drawings in the Royal Collection.

O'Donnell noticed that no university or other institution ran a course that covered all elements of the fine and decorative arts. With the support of Sir Trenchard Cox of the Victoria and Albert Museum, O'Donnell established and designed a course for those wishing to work in museums, as auctioneers, art students, or those who owned or ran country houses. The course was convened in the V&A's galleries and lecture hall, and O'Donnell recruited from the Courtauld Institute and the museum to lecture. It was colloquially known as the "V. & A. course". From these informal roots, O'Donnell founded the Study Centre for the History of the Fine and Decorative Arts in 1964. The course received far more applications than places, and the demand led to other universities establishing their own, similar courses. Helena Hayward later ran the course with her, and with Hayward and Harriet Bridgeman she published books on fine art. Some of the graduates from the course during O'Donnell's tenure included Giles Waterfield and Timothy Schroder.

In 1990, O'Donnell was awarded an MBE for her services to the Centre, and retired as its director the same year.

The National Archives at Kew hold papers relating to O'Donnell and the Centre from 1955 to 1975.

== Personal life ==
In 1958, O'Donnell married Józef Kisielewski (1905–1966), a Polish writer, journalist and politician. Kisielewski and O'Donnell had two children.

On 12 March 1999, O'Donnell died in London aged 79.
