= Jerzy Lefeld =

Polish composer and pianist (1898 - 1980)

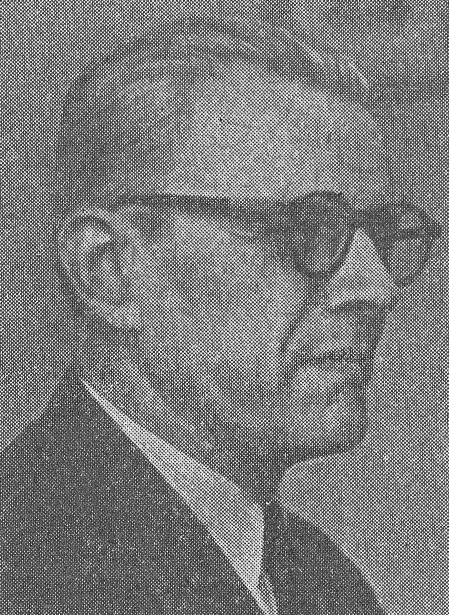

Jerzy Lefeld (Jerzy Albert Lefeld) born 17 January 1898 in Warsaw, died on 22 February 1980 in Warsaw, was a Polish composer, pianist and a music teacher.

From 1917 until World War II he taught piano at the Warsaw Conservatory. He became its professor in 1933. In the period 1924-1926 he also collaborated with the experimental radio studio in Warsaw and from 1926 with the Polish Radio (including as a member of the Polish Radio Little Orchestra conducted by J. Ozimiński). In the years 1941-1944 he worked as a teacher and played in cafes and private homes. After the war he resumed work in the successor of the Conservatory, the Fryderyk Chopin Music Academy.

His notable pupils included Witold Lutosławski and Stefan Kisielewski.

He composed many pieces, including several symphonies.

== Selected works ==
- String Sextet in E♭ major for 2 Violins, 2 Violas, and 2 Cellos (1919)
- Variations on a Folk Theme for Piano (1937)
- Six Songs for Voice and Orchestra (1948)
