= Alfons Karpiński =

Polish painter (1875–1961)

Alfons Karpiński. Selfportrait

Alfons Karpiński (February 20, 1875 – June 6, 1961) was a Polish painter specializing in portraits of women, still-lives and landscapes. His work is associated with the traditionalist and decorative trends in Polish 20th-century painting.

== Life and work ==
Karpiński was born in 1875 in Rozwadów near Tarnobrzeg. He studied painting in Kraków at the School of Fine Arts under Leon Wyczółkowski between 1891 and 1895 and after 1903 at the Munich Academy under Anton Ažbe, until 1907. He continued his studies at the Academy of Fine Arts Vienna under Kazimierz Pochwalski and finally, at the Parisian Académie Colarossi.

At the turn of the century he became a contributing artist to the Zielony Balonik art-and-literary cabaret in Kraków. He was a member of the Society of Polish Artists "Sztuka" (Art). Karpiński remained active following the end of World War II and died in 1961 in Kraków.

== See also ==
- List of Polish painters
