= Wpływologia =

"Wpływologia" ("influenceology") is a Polish term that is sometimes used within the history and theory of literature, the history and theory of art, the history and theory of music, and even within general history. The term expresses skepticism about exaggerated attempts at tracking down alleged "influences" among artists, scholars, and their respective works.

== History ==
The term wpływologia was formed from the Polish wpływ ("influence") and from -logia, a Greek-derived suffix meaning "science."

The term was coined after World War I by Polish literary critic Adam Grzymała-Siedlecki. (According to Karol Irzykowski, its author was actually the prominent author and translator Tadeusz Boy-Żeleński.) The neologism immediately won currency among Polish scholars and literary critics due to the anti-positivist turn that the humanities had taken in the early 20th century.

The term wpływologia made light of certain positivist practices that had been common in the 19th-century humanities. Positivist history of literature had posited that the study of literature might be regarded as scientific only when it deals with facts, and that scientific analysis must formulate general laws. Positivist analysis saw these laws as being embodied in "influences" ("wpływy") obtaining among various writers and their works.

This view had led some positivist-influenced literary historians to propose outlandish theories concerning "influences" on specific literary works. Even the greatest masterpieces had sometimes been seen as mere recombinations of influences derived from earlier works, rather than as independent works in their own right.

== See also ==
- Positivism in Poland
- Tadeusz Boy-Żeleński
- Karol Irzykowski
- Comparative literature
