= Tadeusz Rychter =

Painter of the Holy Land

Tadeusz Rychter with wife Bronisława, circa 1900. An undated, hand-written note on the photograph reads: The work has ravaged her health, and her husband, mistreated her. Frombork Museum

Tadeusz Rychter (c. 1873 in Lviv – 1943 in Warsaw) was a Polish early twentieth-century artist best remembered for his watercolors of the Holy Land.

Rychter studied at the Jan Matejko Academy of Fine Arts in Kraków, where he became the contributing artist to the legendary Zielony Balonik art-and-literary cabaret. He married a fellow Cracovian artist Bronisława Janowska, but left her for a German artist from an aristocratic family, Anna May-Rychter, whom he met while in Munich. He was Catholic and could not obtain a divorce; they could not be legally wed, which may also explain their decision to settle in Palestine in 1920–1923. While still in Europe, the two worked with Rudolf Steiner on the construction of the first Goetheanum in Switzerland and were members of the artist's group "Aenigma".

In Palestine, Rychter earned a living restoring art in old churches, and selling watercolor paintings of Christian holy sites to tourists. Many of his surviving paintings are in the possession of British families whose ancestors purchased them while stationed with the British administration in Mandate Palestine. In 1935 Tadeusz Rychter applied for membership in the Palestine Artists' Association but was turned down because of his religion. He returned to Poland at the time of the German invasion in 1939, and disappeared in Warsaw in 1941. He died in 1943, murdered by the Nazis.
