= Kazimierz Sichulski =

Polish painter (1879–1942)

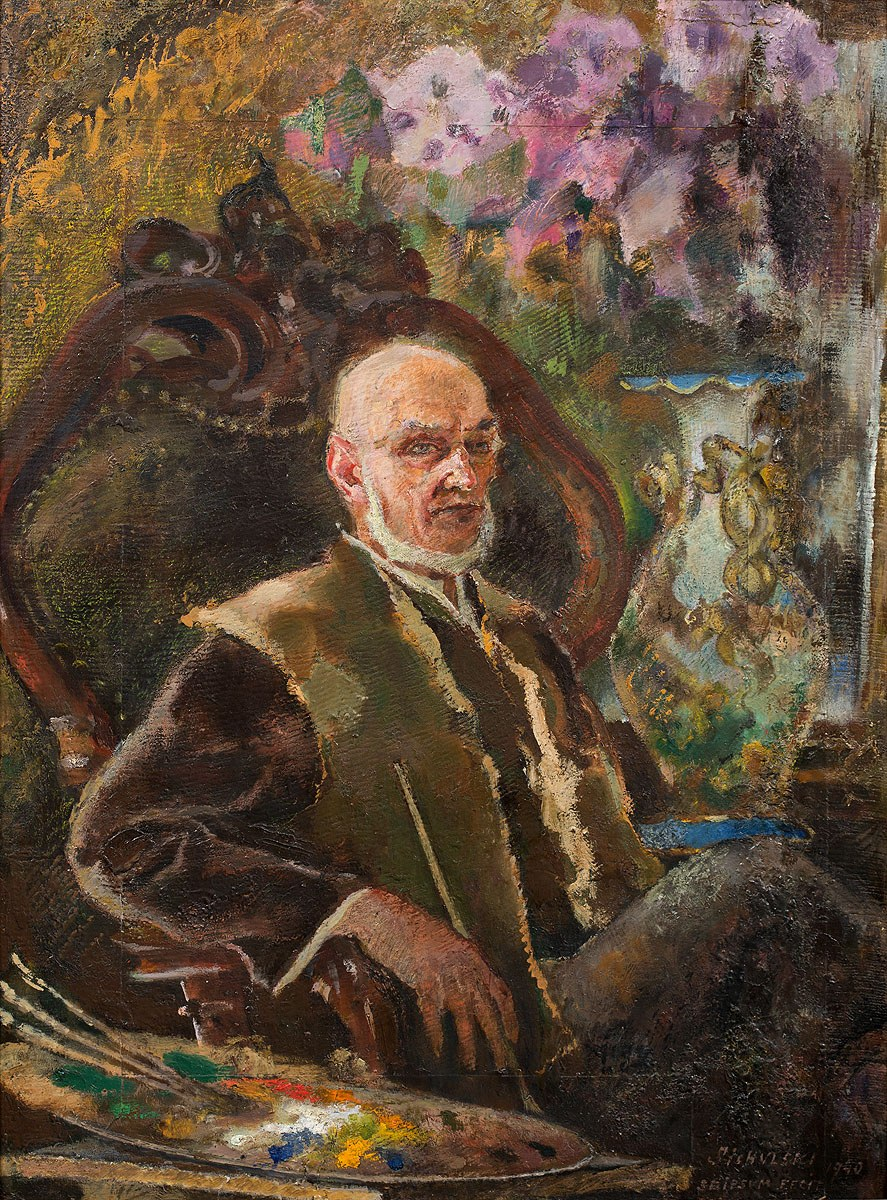
Self Portrait; 1940, oil on cardboard, 74 × 101 cm, private collection.

Kazimierz Sichulski (17 January 1879 – 6 November 1942) was a Polish painter, lithographer and caricaturist; associated with the Young Poland movement. His work was part of the painting event in the art competition at the 1928 Summer Olympics.

== Biography ==
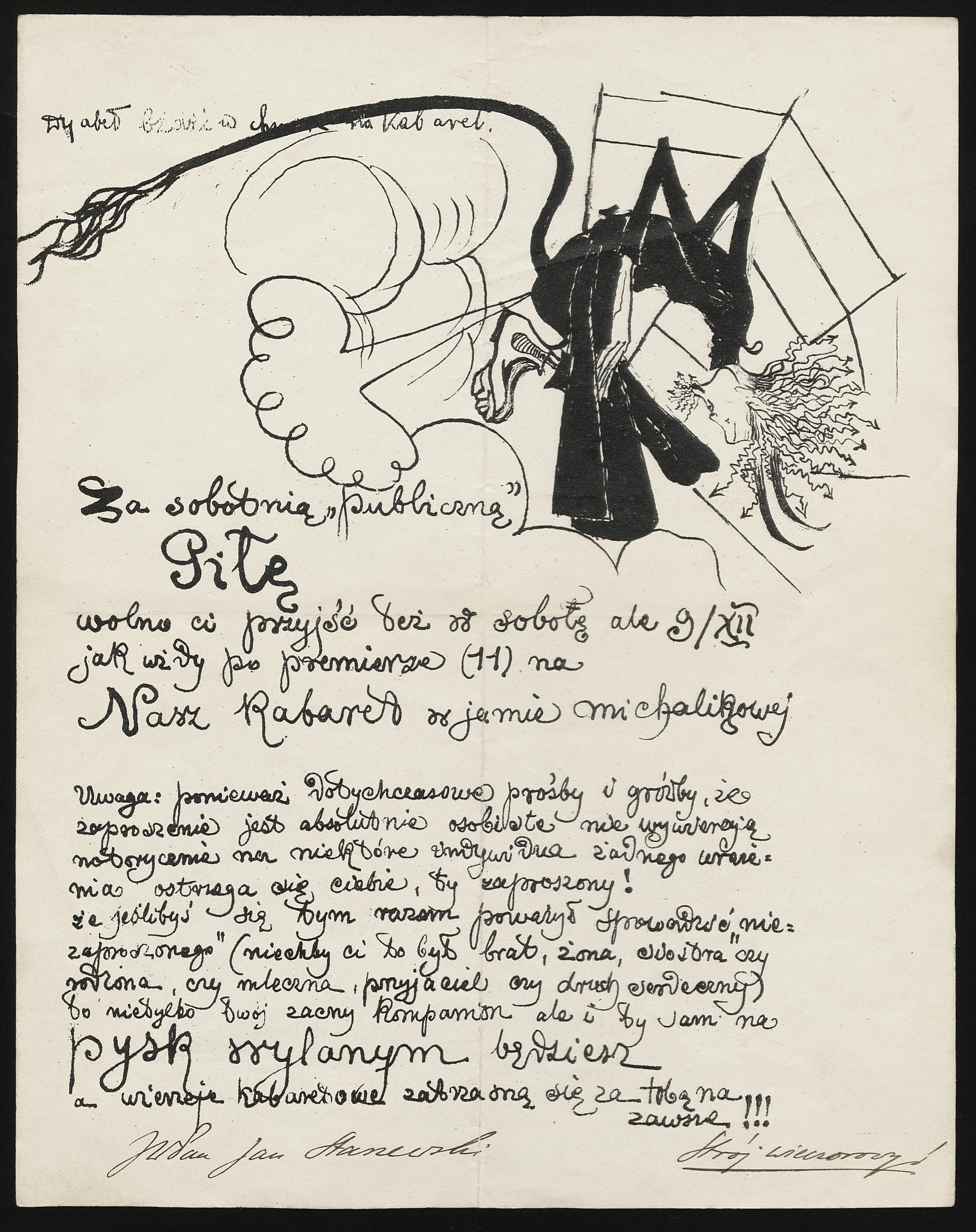
Invitation to the "Green Balloon"; before 1913, Jagiellonian Library.

Sichulski was born on 17 January 1879, in Lviv. His father was a railway engineer, who died while Kazimierz was still a small child.

For a short time, he studied law at the University of Lviv, but did not return there after serving his mandatory stint with the Austro-Hungarian Army. From 1900 to 1908, he studied at the Kraków Academy of Fine Arts under Leon Wyczółkowski, Józef Mehoffer and Stanisław Wyspiański. He received a scholarship and continued his studies in Rome, Munich and Paris at the Académie Colarossi. During this time, he married an actress named Bronisława Rudlicka (1875–1920).

He made his début in 1903 at a showing of the Kraków Society of Friends of Fine Arts. From then until 1905, he also worked as a cartoonist for the short-lived satirical magazine, Liberum Veto. In 1905, he became one of the founding members of the artistic circle at the Zielony Balonik (Green Balloon) cabaret and joined the Society of Polish Artists "Sztuka". While visiting Vienna, he joined the Hagenbund and was a member until 1921.

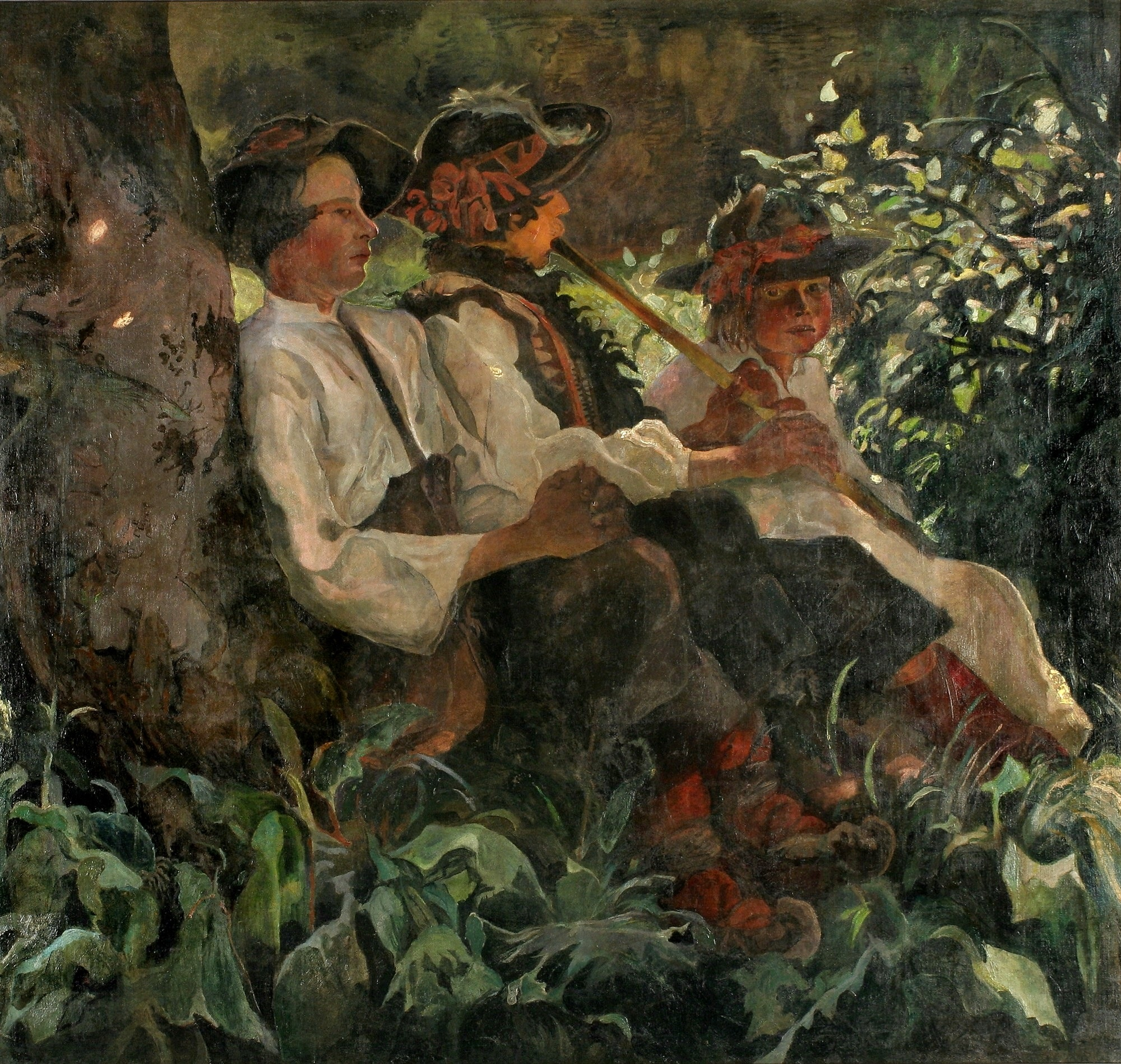
Sunday depicting Hutsul life; 1907, oil on canvas, 138 × 149 cm, National Museum, Wrocław.

In 1905, he and some fellow artists also paid a visit to Huculszczyzna; home of the Hutsuls. This resulted in a lifetime fascination with their culture and customs. Some of his best-known paintings are depictions of their folk costumes.

During World War I, he fought in the Polish Legions as the commander of an artillery platoon. He also worked at the Supreme National Committee and served as an artist for the 3rd Battalion. Later, he became a warrant officer in the Austrian Army, serving at the Ministry of Defense. In 1916, his childless marriage ended in divorce and he remarried into a noble family.

From 1920 to 1930, he was a teacher at the State Industrial School in Lviv then, from 1930 to 1939, taught at his alma mater in Kraków; becoming a Professor in 1937. The following year, he was awarded the "Golden Laurel" by the Polish Academy of Literature for his contributions to Polish art.

After the Occupation of Poland he lost his position and his health began to deteriorate. He died at home of heart disease after a brief stay in the hospital on 6 November 1942, in Lviv.

== Works ==
=== Genres ===
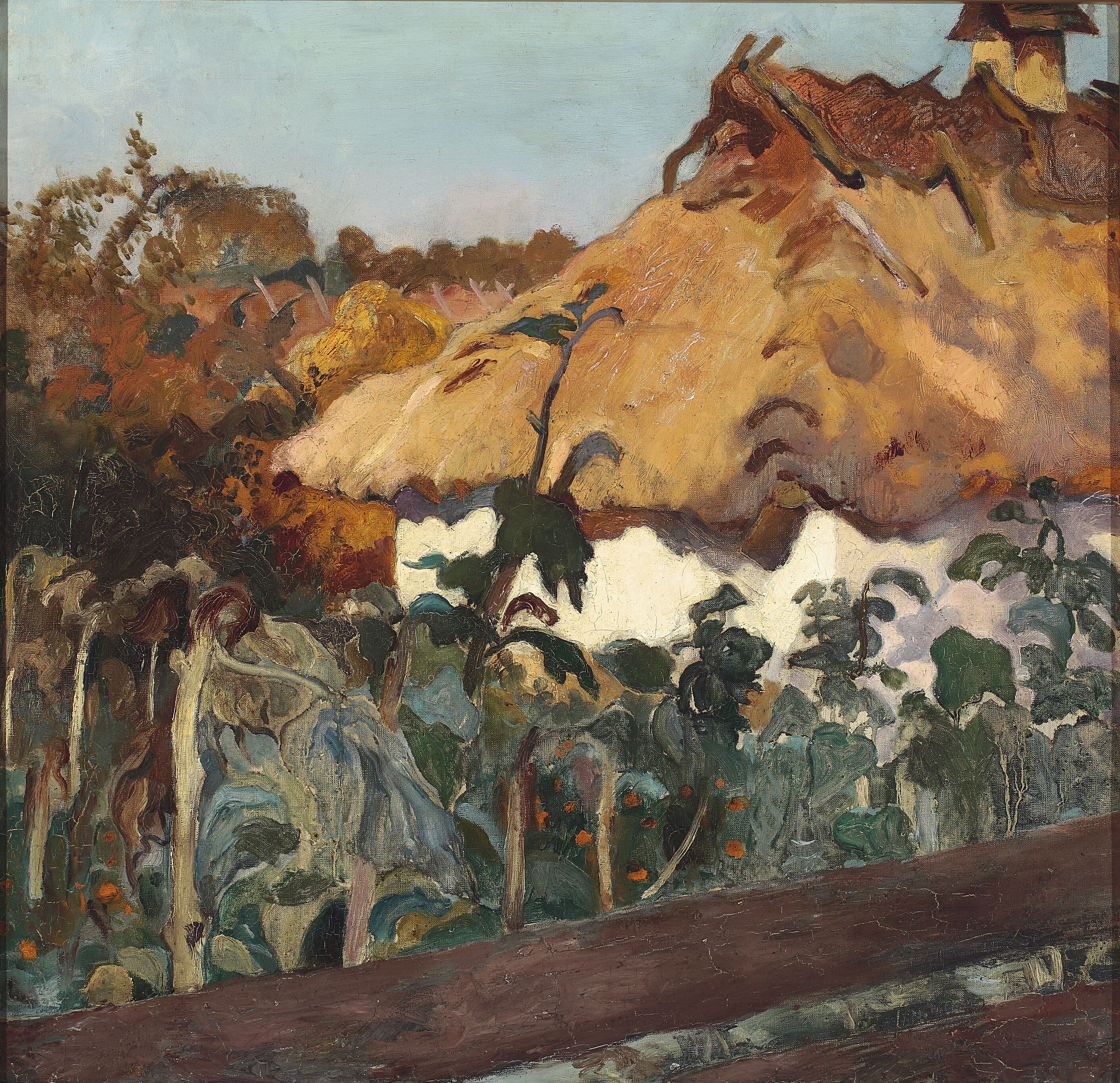
Landscape: Cottage; 1900s, oil on canvas, 76 × 74 cm, National Museum, Warsaw.

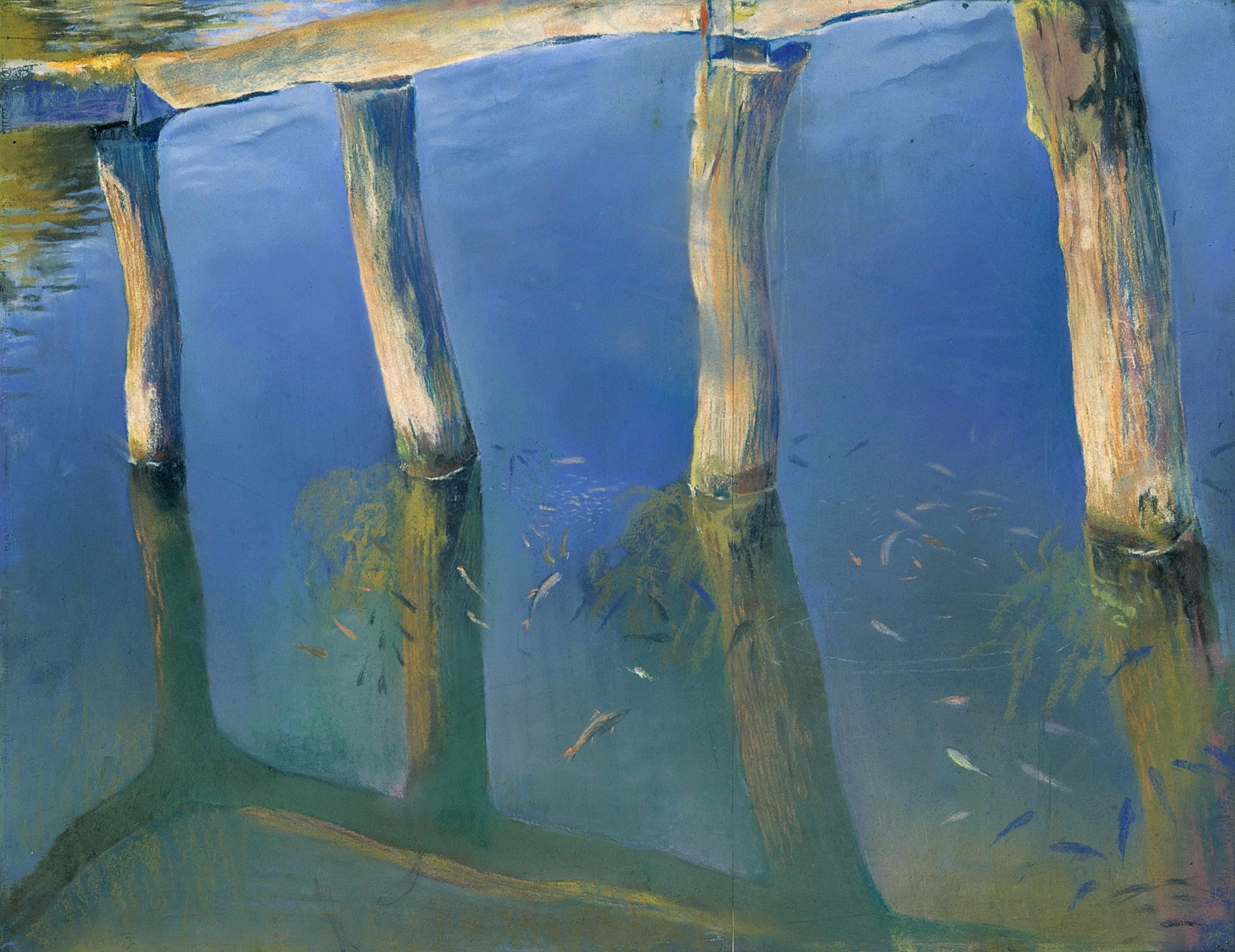
Animals: Fish; 1908, pastel on paperboard, 82 × 63 cm, National Museum, Poznań.

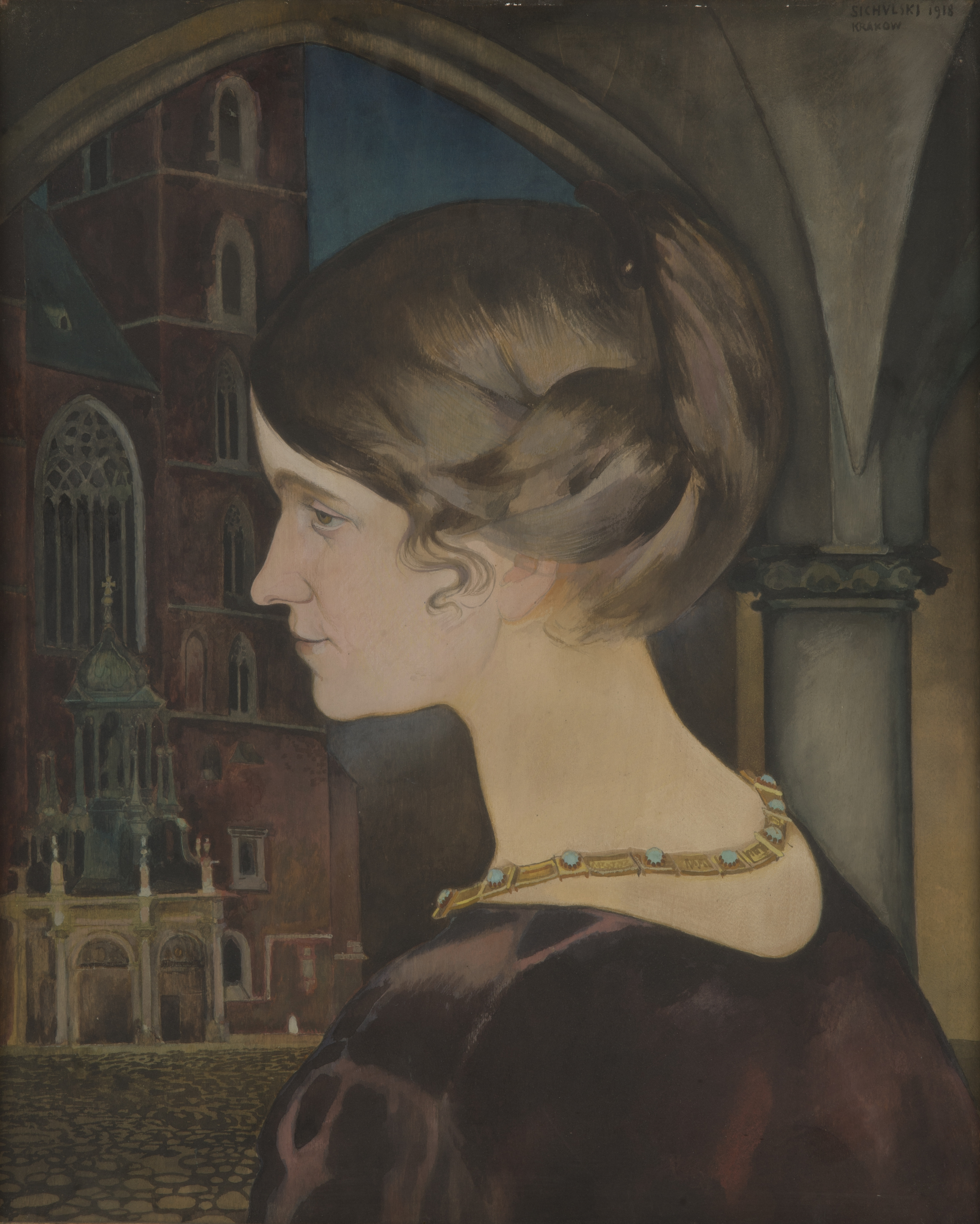
Portraiture: Portrait of Maria Sobolewska; 1918, tempera on plank, 45 × 37 cm, National Museum, Kraków.

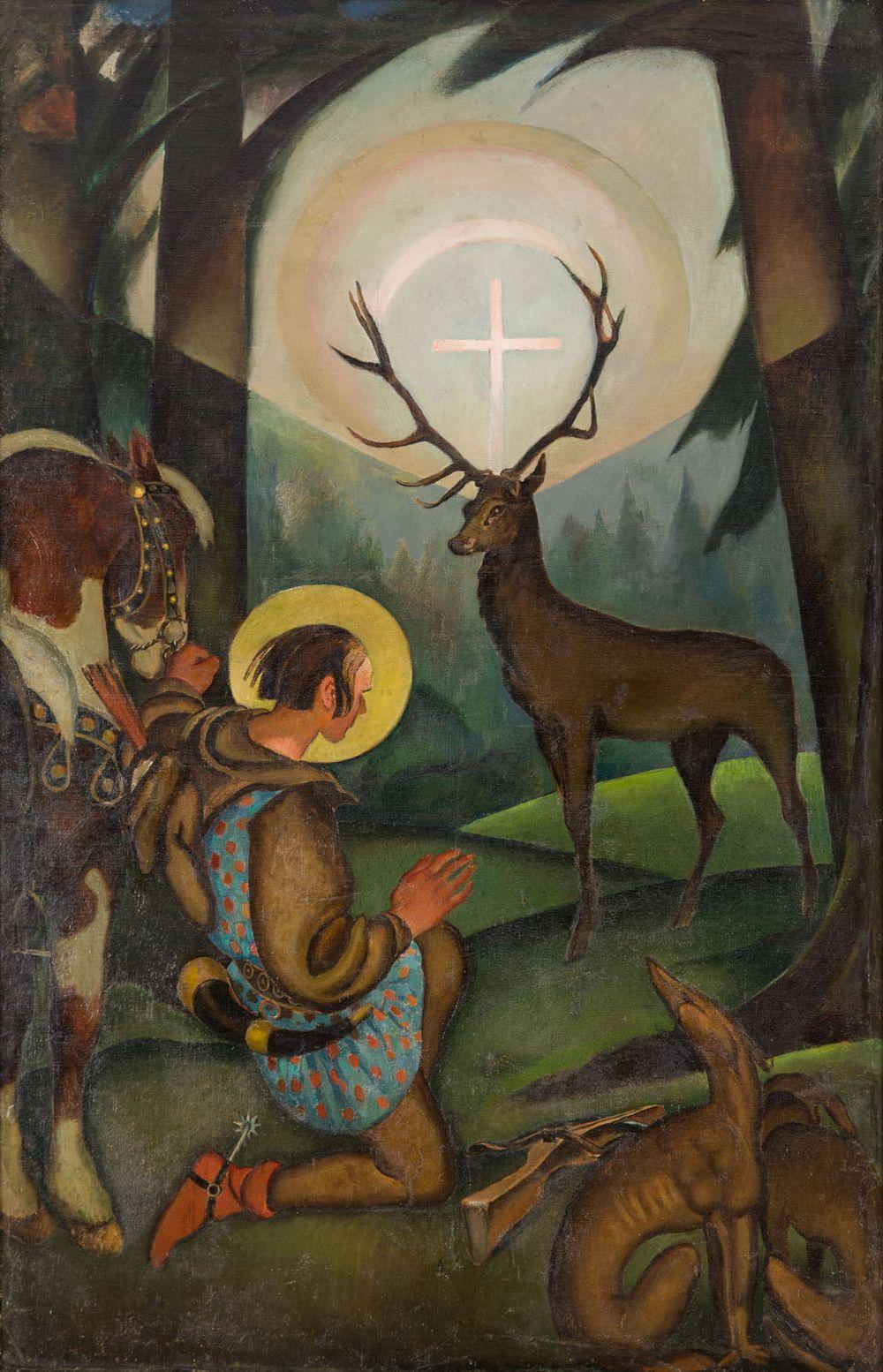
Religious: Vision of St. Hubert; 1920s, oil on canvas, 154 x 104 cm, private collection.

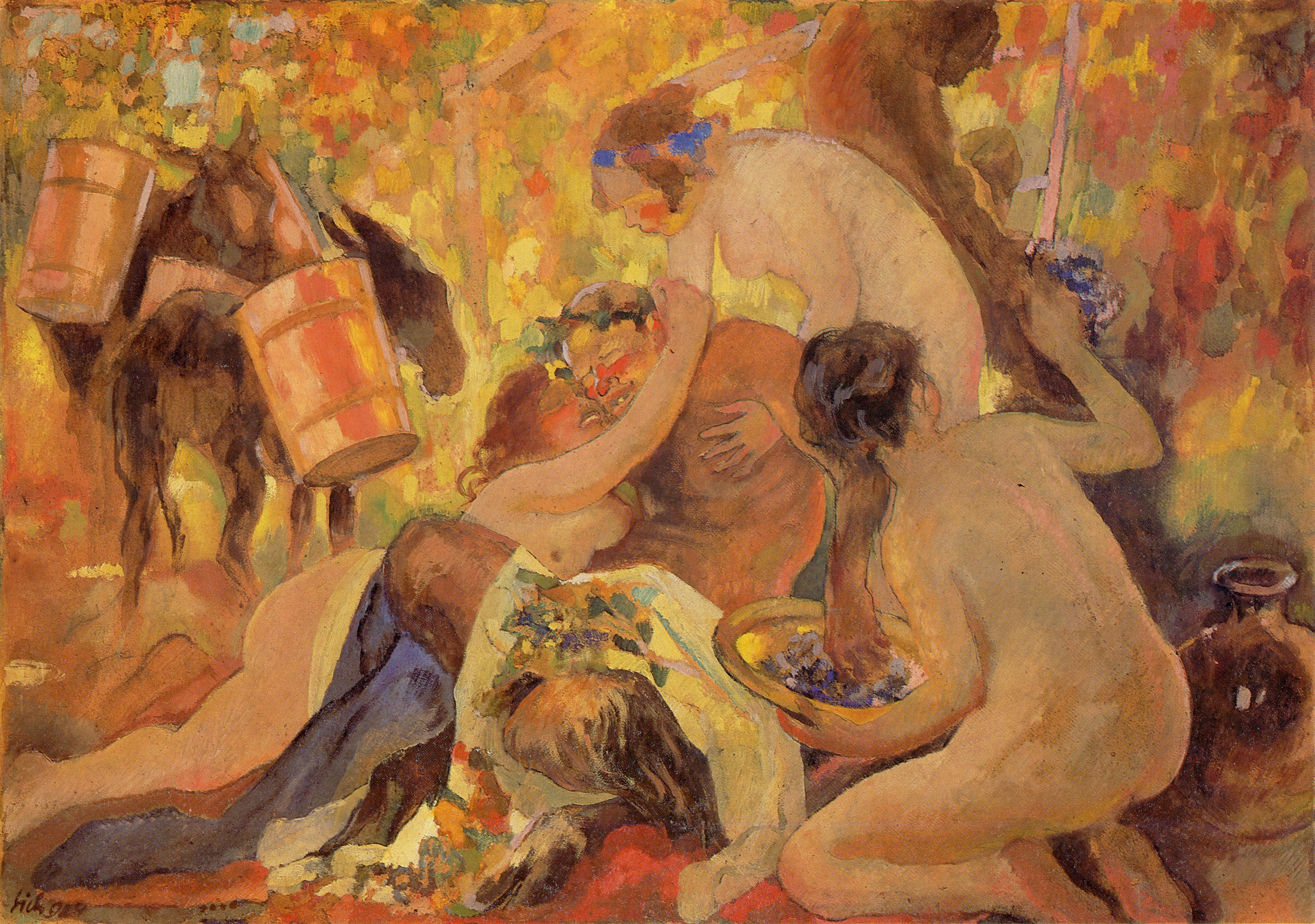
History painting: Bacchanalia; 1924, tempera on cardboard, 69 × 98 cm, Lviv National Art Gallery.

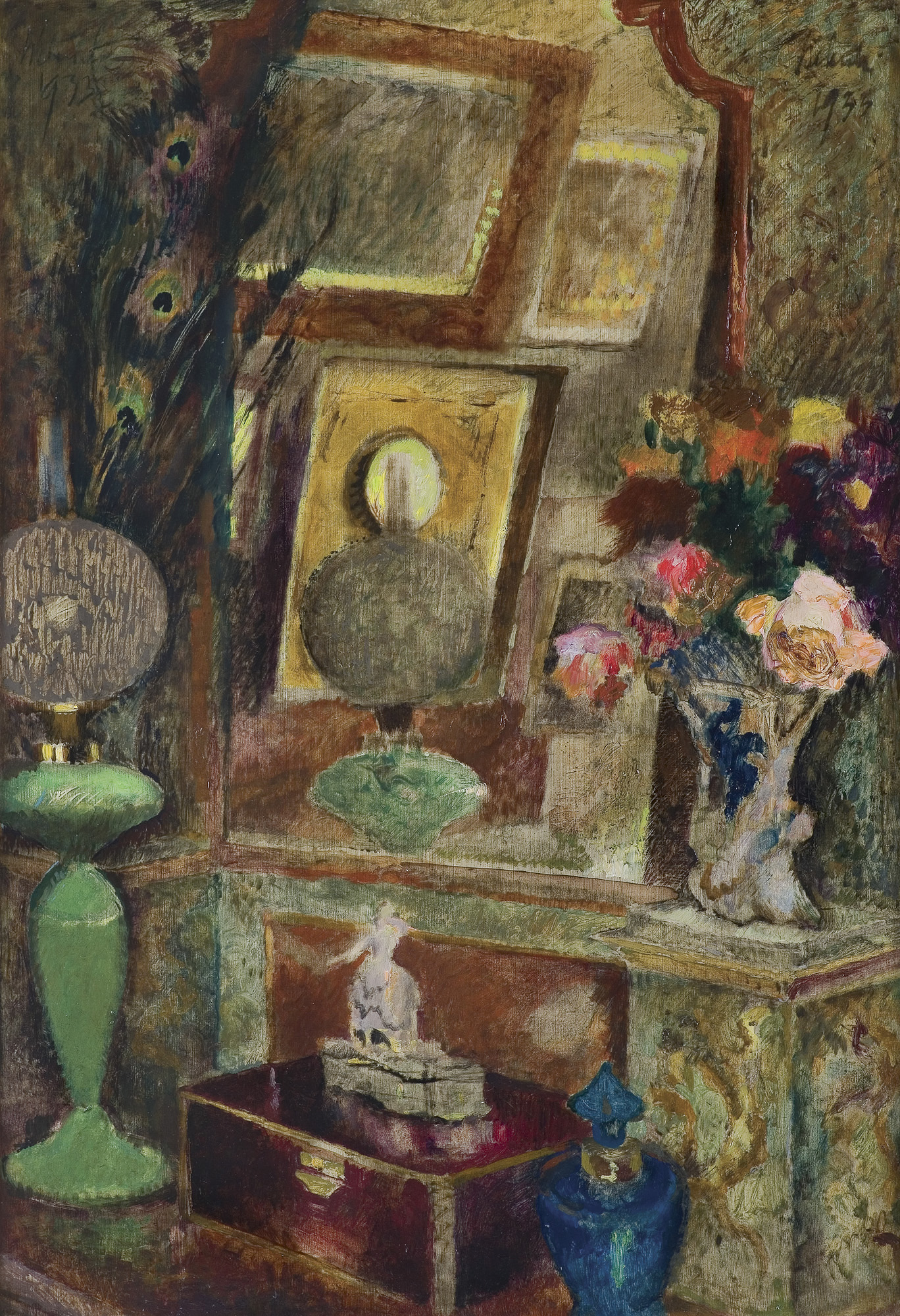
Still life: My Studio (Still Life); 1933, oil on plywood, 105 cm × 72 cm, private collection.

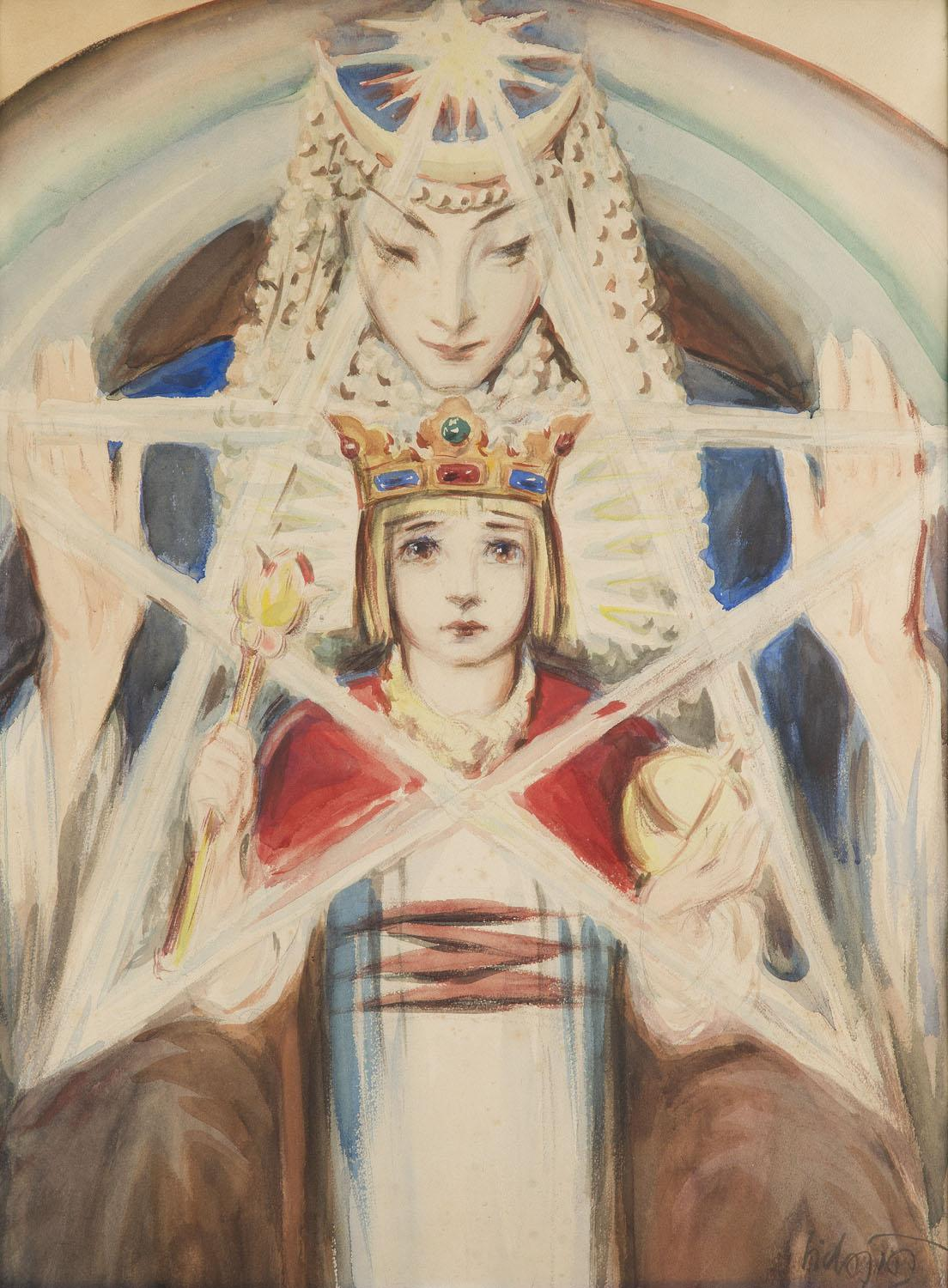
Allegory: Symbolic Scene, Ishtar with Gilgamesh; 20th-century, watercolour and crayon on paper, 68 × 50 cm, private collection.

==== Hutsul depictions ====
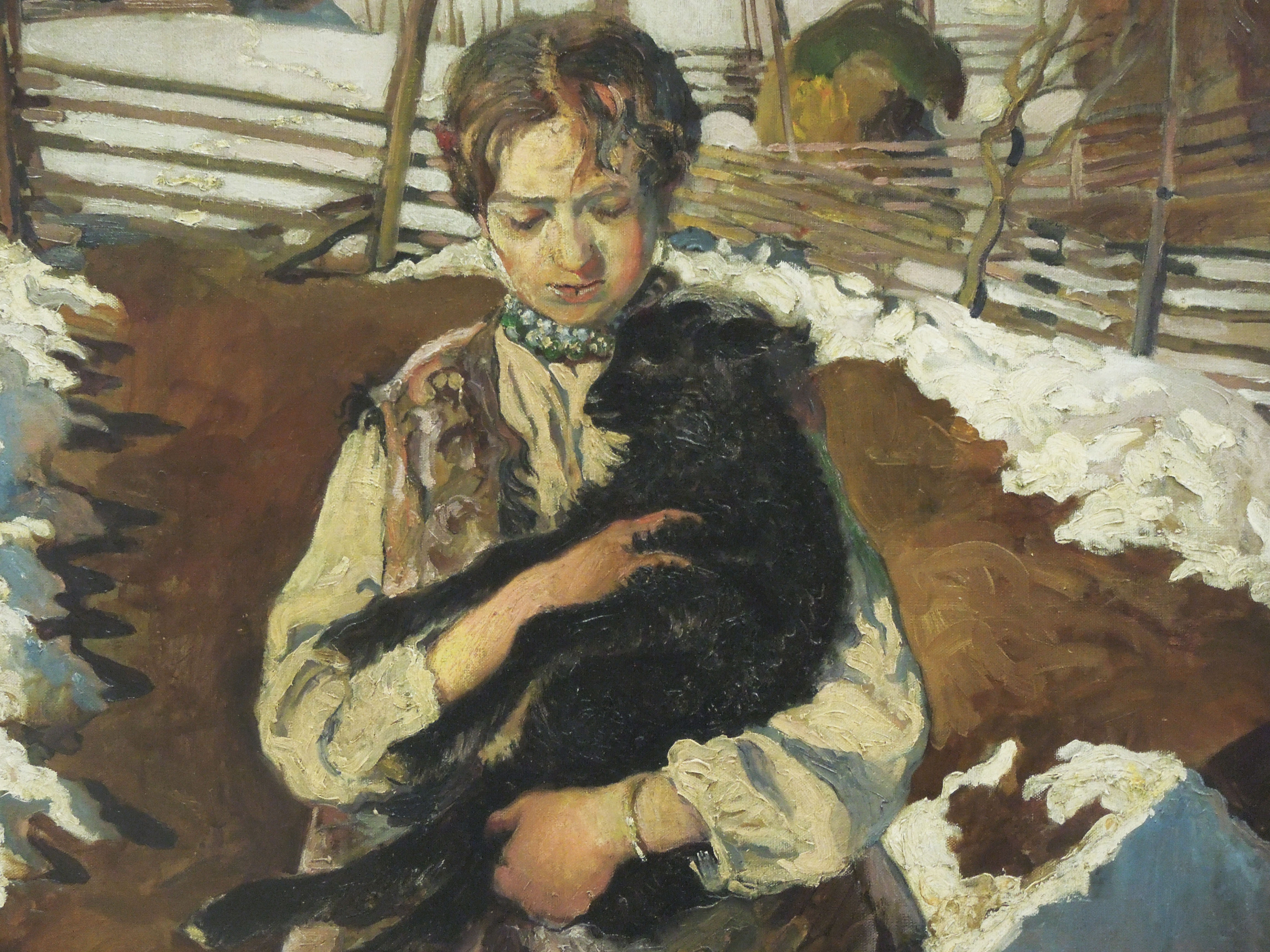
Animal: Black Lamb; 1905, National Museum, Poznań.

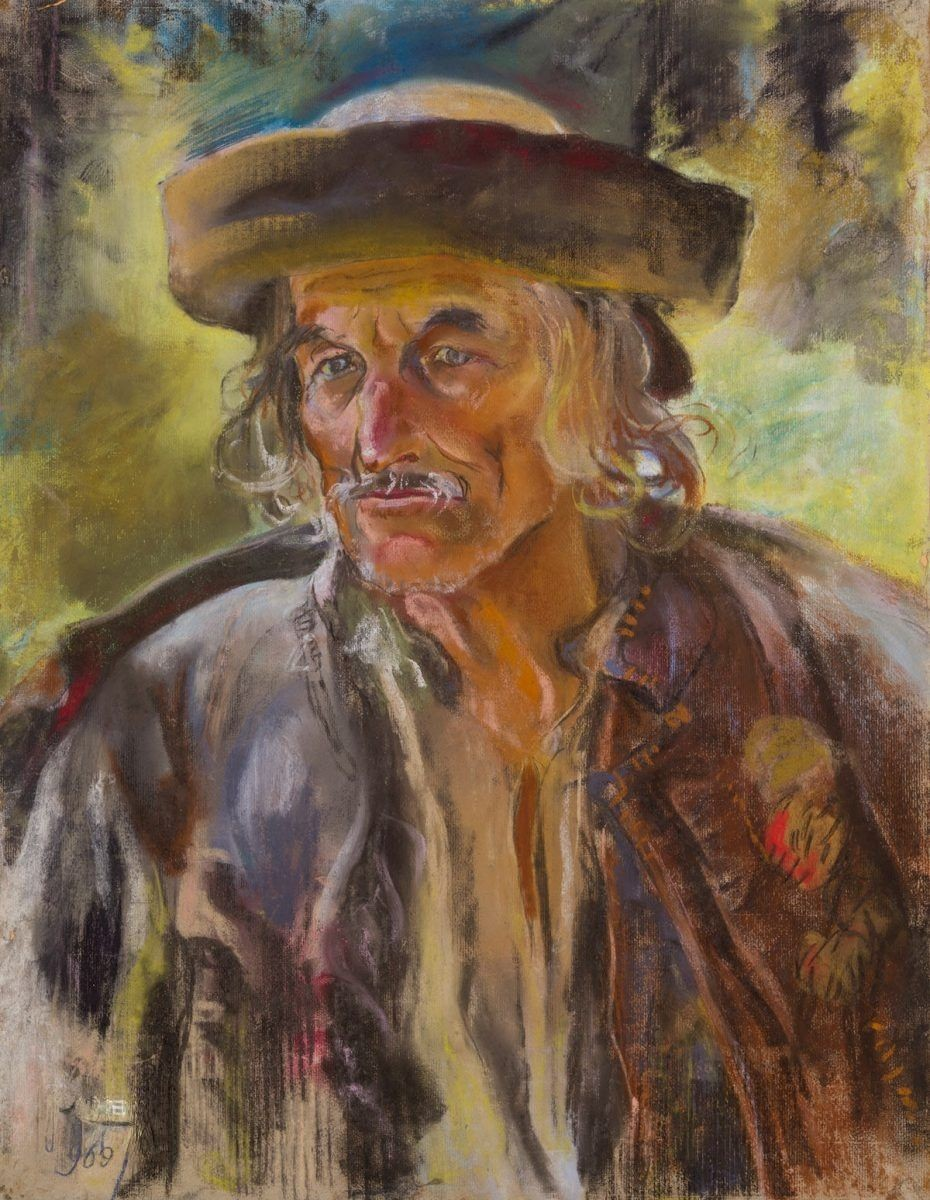
Portraiture: Bust of Hutsul; 1906, National Museum, Kraków.

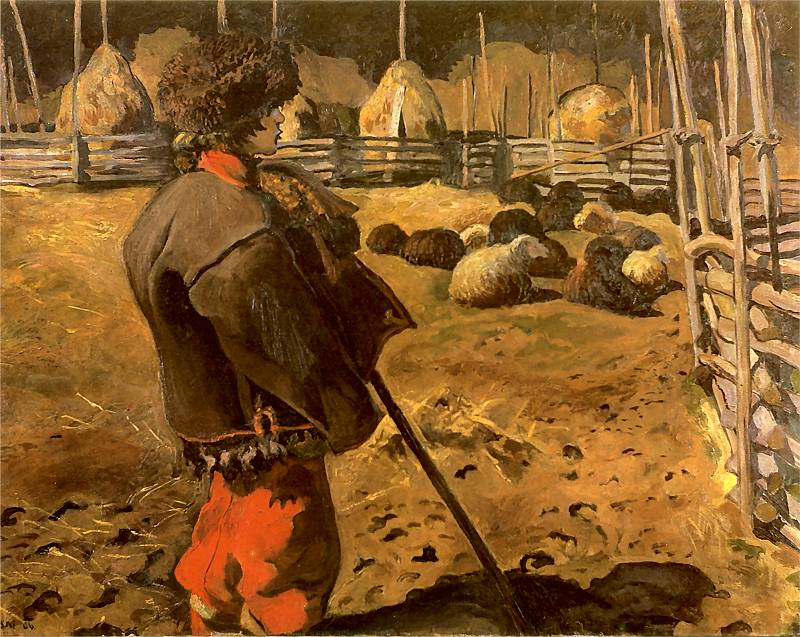
Landscape: Shepherd; 1906, oil on canvas, 98 × 132 cm, District Museum, Lublin.

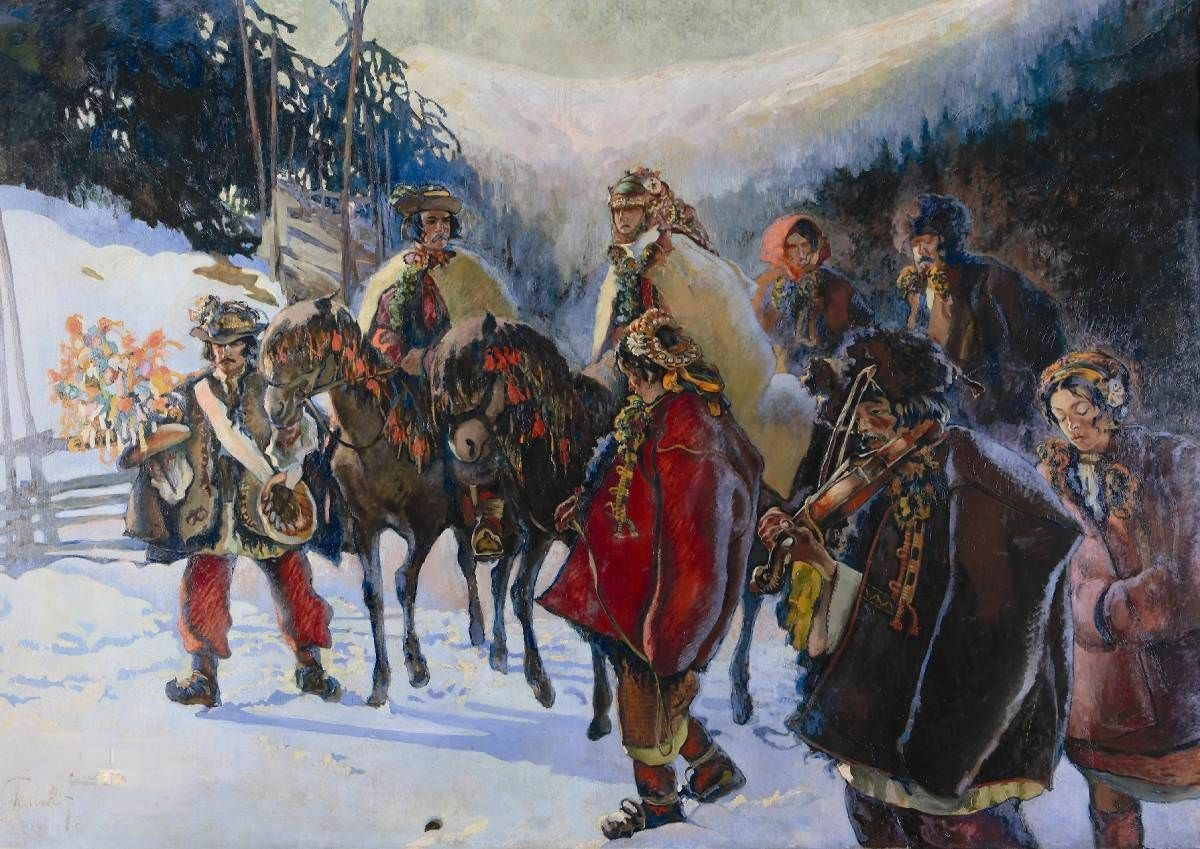
Genre painting: Hutsul Wedding; 1909, Masovian Museum, Płock.

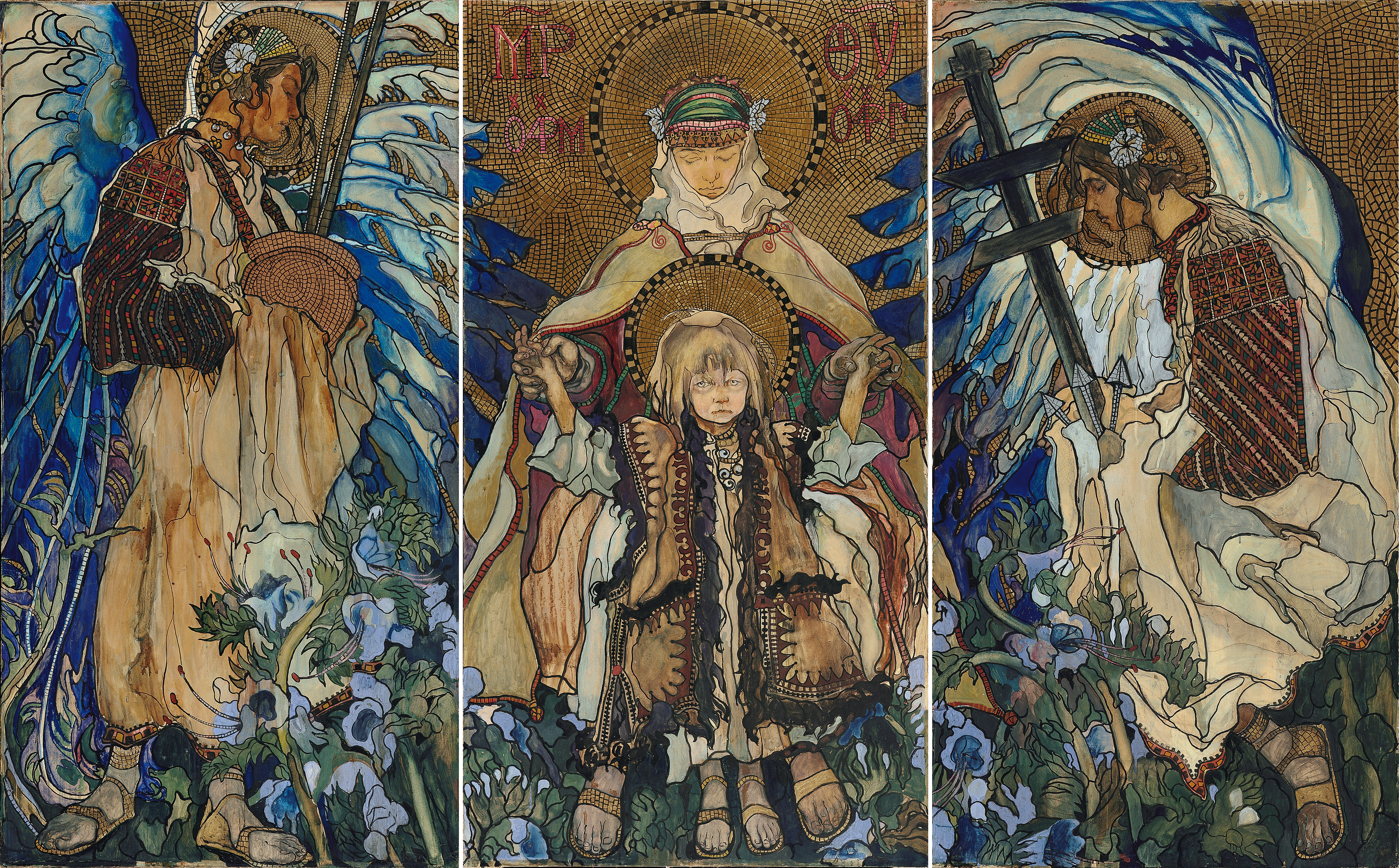
Religious: The Hutsul Madonna triptych; 1909, tempera and pastel on paper laid down on canvas, 167 × 270 cm, Österreichische Galerie Belvedere.

=== Styles ===
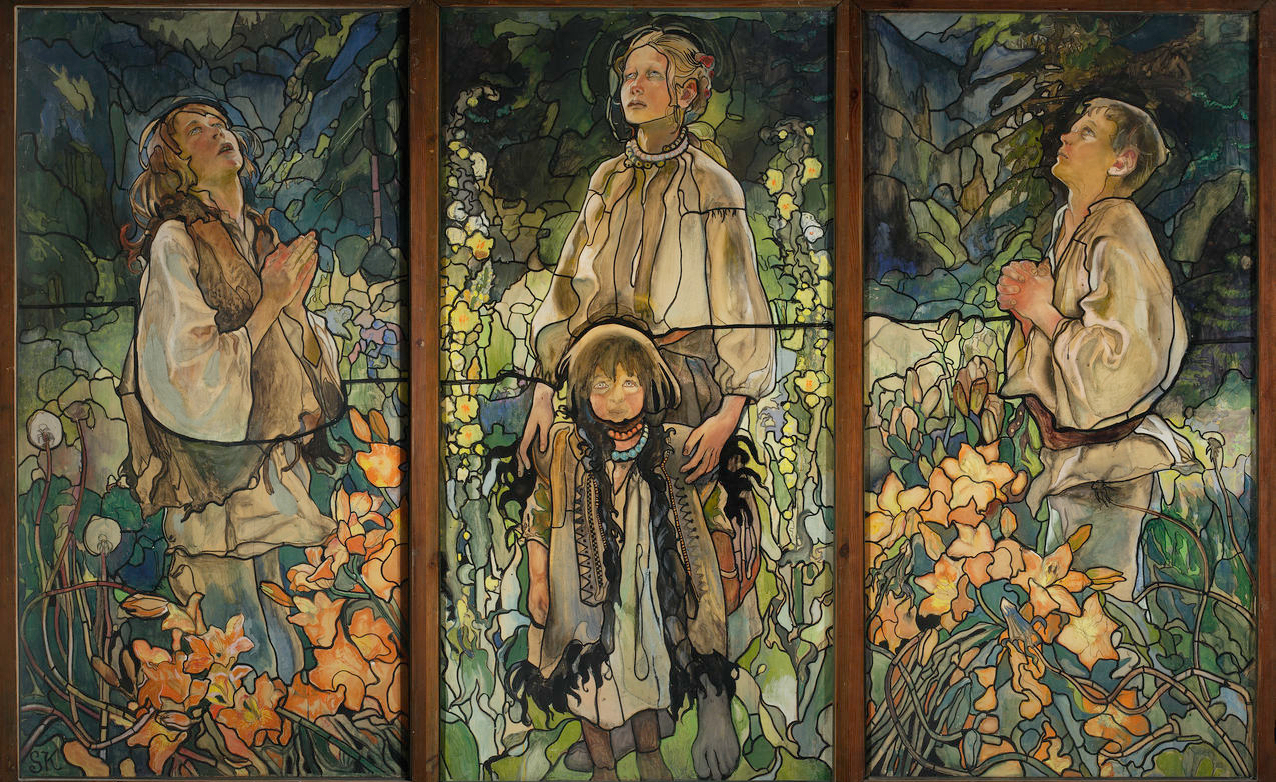
Young Poland: Spring triptych; 1909, tempera and pastel on cardboard, 145 × 231 cm, National Museum, Warsaw.

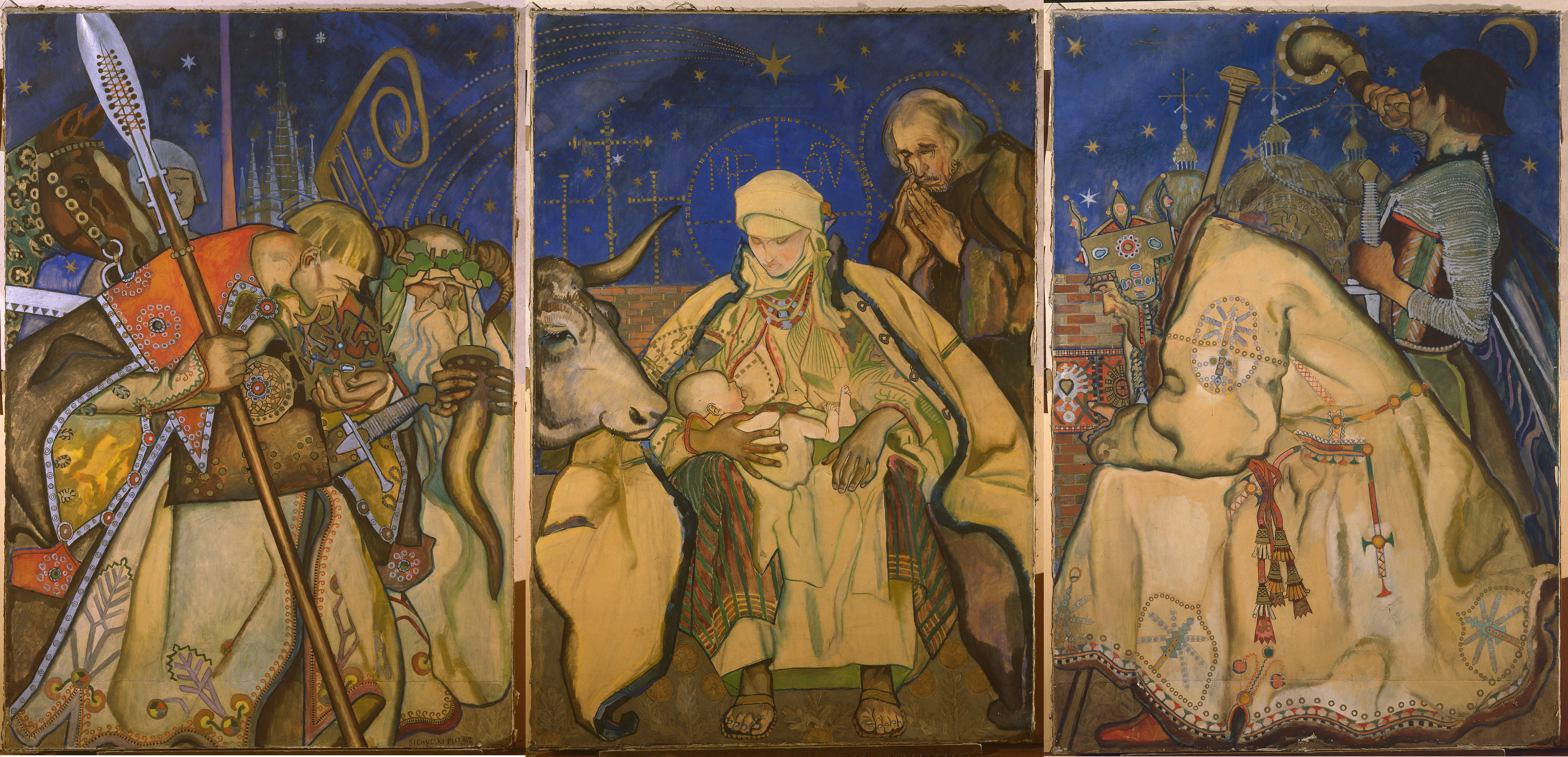
Art Nouveau: Adoration of the Magi triptych; 1913, watercolour and tempera on paper laid down on canvas, 154 × 312 cm, National Museum, Warsaw.

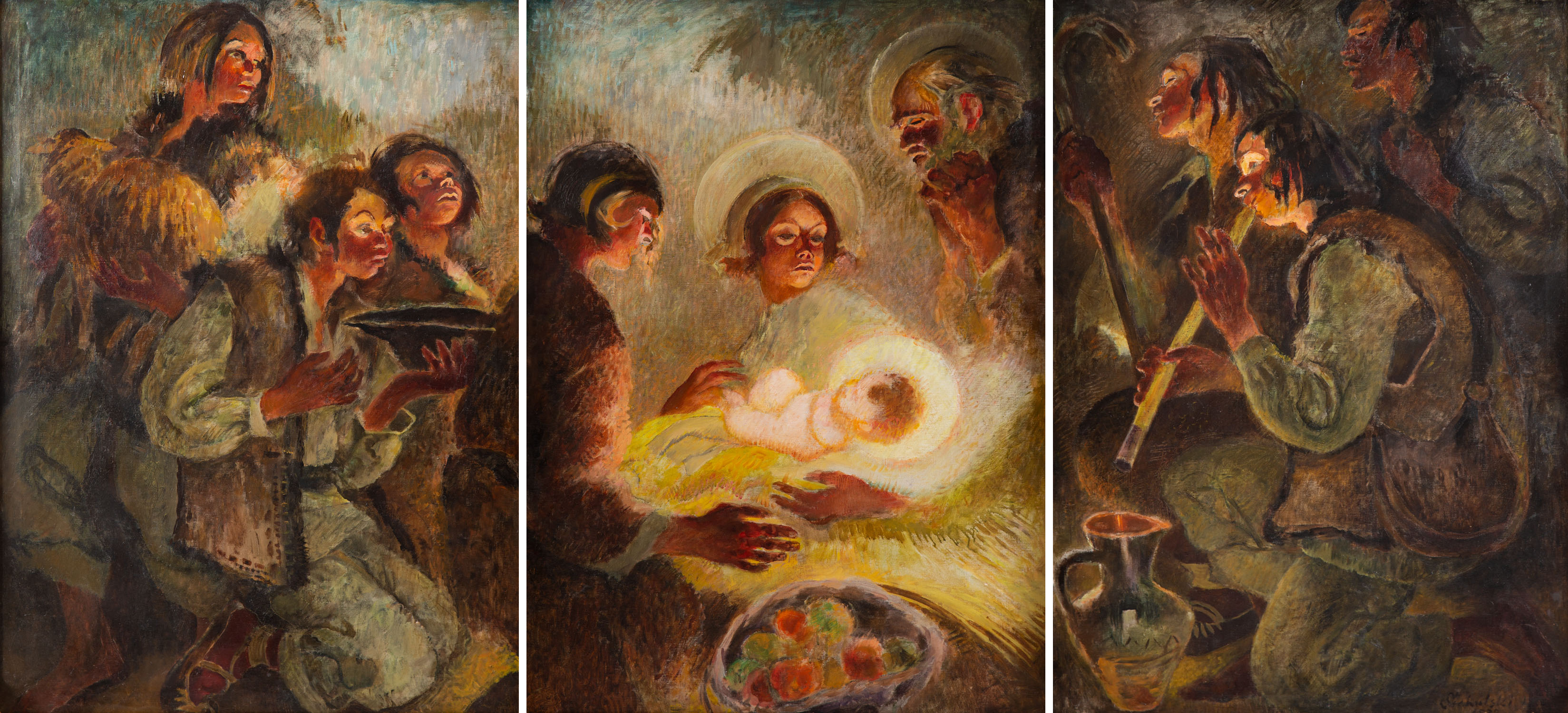
Impressionism: Adoration of the Shepherds triptych; 1938, oil on canvas, 102 × 222 cm, private collection.

=== Other works ===
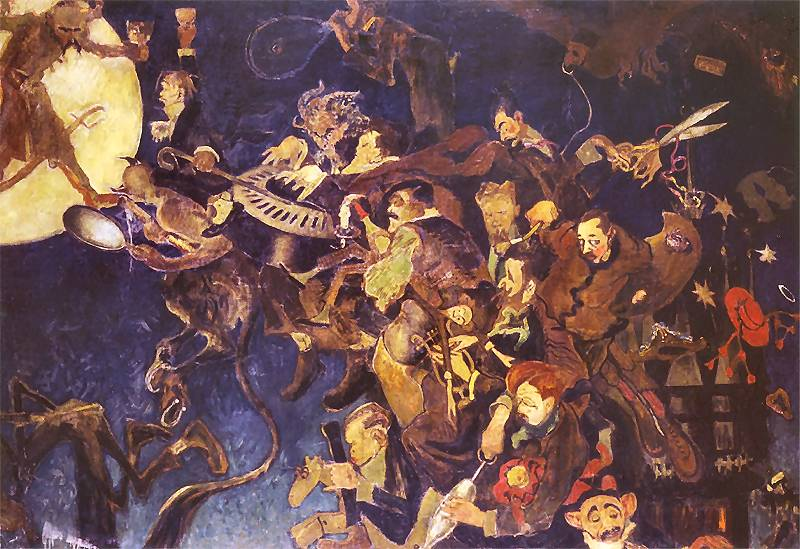
Caricature: At the Green Balloon; 1908, oil on canvas, 147 × 204 cm, Adam Mickiewicz Museum of Literature, Warsaw.

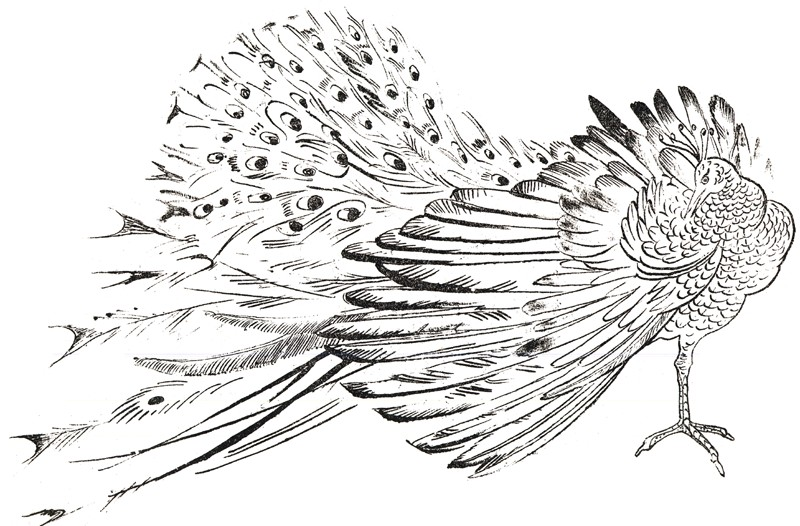
Lithograph: Peacock Autolithograph; 1925.

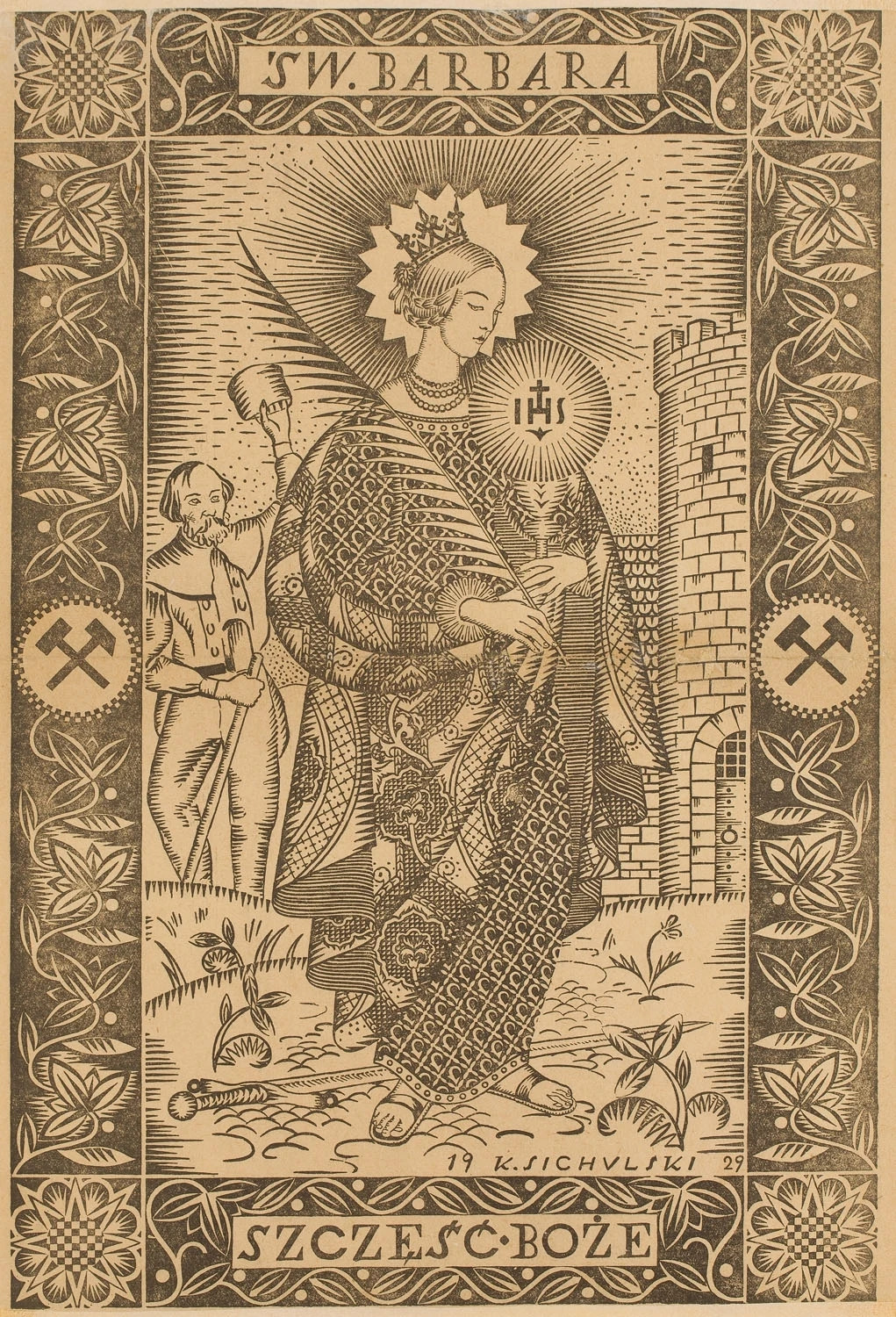
Woodcut: St. Barbara; 1929, wood, 41 × 28 cm, private collection.
