= Karol Irzykowski =

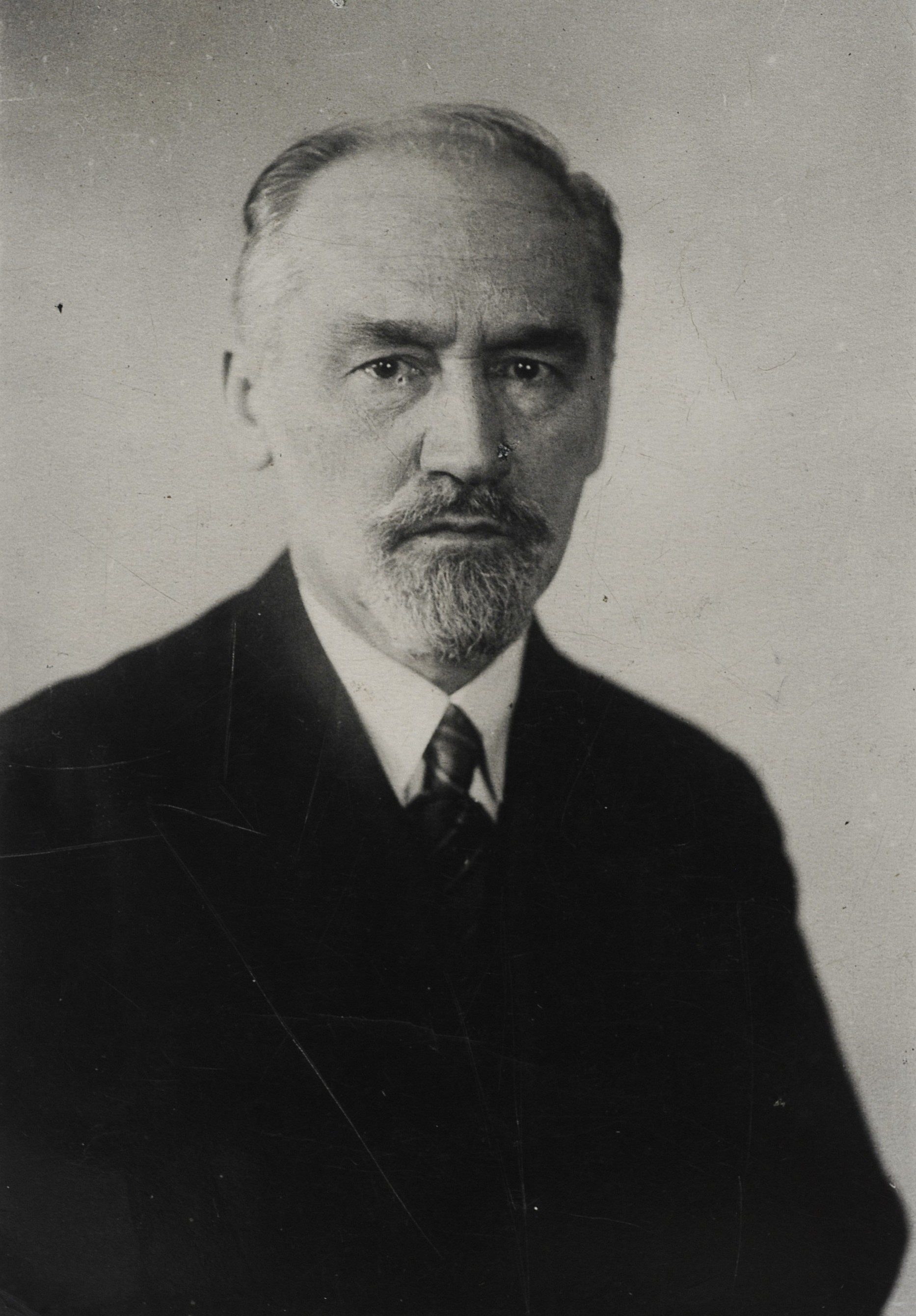
Karol Irzykowski.

Karol Irzykowski (23 January 1873 – 2 November 1944) was a Polish writer, literary critic, film theoretician, and chess player. Between 1933 and 1939 in the Second Polish Republic he was a member of the prestigious Polish Academy of Literature founded by the decree of the Council of Ministers.

== Life ==
Irzykowski was born in Błaszkowa, near Pilzno. He came from an aristocratic land-owning family that had fallen on hard times. From 1889 to 1893, he studied Germanistics in Lwów (Lemberg). From 1894 to 1895, he worked occasionally as a teacher, but his outspokenness prevented him from obtaining further work in that line. From 1895, he lived in Lwów and worked as a parliamentary and court stenographer.

In 1903, he published one of the most original novels of that time, Pałuba. In this highly complex and avantgarde work, he anticipated many innovations made by modern European experimentalists such as James Joyce, Virginia Woolf, William Faulkner or André Gide. The novel has never been translated, and in Poland, it was only truly appreciated in the second half of the 20th century. (Parts of this novel were translated into German language after World War II).

In 1908, he moved to Kraków, where he held a position as a stenographer and correspondent in the official correspondence office. Irzykowski played in chess tournaments at Lemberg and Kraków, winning against Kohn, von Popiel, Chajes and Ameisen, and drawing against Flamberg.

After World War I he moved to Warsaw, where he headed the Sejm (parliament) stenographic office. Irzykowski was coworker of "Skamander", the Wiadomości Literackie and in the years 1921 to 1933 of the Robotnik. He raised his voice in many discussions on literature. He provided a theatre column on Polish radio and in the Rocznik Literacki, and was a member of the Polish Literary Academy. At the same time he gave stenography instruction (also in German) to meet living costs.

During the German occupation of Poland, he was working on a novel Wyspa ("Island") and was taking part in the cultural life of the underground. His nearly entire manuscript was lost in the Warsaw Uprising where Irzykowski was wounded and soon died after release from Żyrardów camp.

== Works ==
- Pałuba [The Hag] (1903) novel
- Sny Marii Dunin [The Dreams of Maria Dunin] (1903) stories
- Dziesiąta Muza [The Tenth Muse] (1924) film theory
- Walka o treść [Fight for Content] (1929) Polemic against Stanisław Ignacy Witkiewicz
- Beniaminek (lampoon on Tadeusz Boy-Żeleński, 1933)
- Słoń wśród porcelany (An Elephant in a China Shop; sketches, 1934)

English translations :

- « Death of the Cinematograph », Film History, vol. 10, n. 4, 1998, p. 453-458.
- « The Tenth Muse (Excerpts) », New German Critique, n. 42, 1987, p. 116–127.

== See also ==
- Wpływologia
