= Dominik Kisiel =

Polish footballer (born 1990)

Personal information
- Date of birth: 15 April 1990 (age 36)
- Place of birth: Bełchatów, Poland
- Height: 1.92 m (6 ft 4 in)
- Position: Goalkeeper

Senior career*
Years	Team	Apps	(Gls)
2006	GKS Bełchatów II		
2007–2012	GKS Bełchatów (ME)	32	(0)
2007–2012	GKS Bełchatów	2	(0)
2010–2012	→ GKS Tychy (loan)	17	(0)
2012–2013	Berliner AK	24	(0)
2013–2015	Hallescher FC	3	(0)
2015–2016	VfL Oldenburg	45	(0)
2016–2018	Viktoria Berlin	40	(0)
2018–2023	VfB Oldenburg	47	(0)

International career
2008	Poland U18	1	(0)
- * Club domestic league appearances and goals as of 5 July 2023

Dominik Kisiel (born 15 April 1990) is a Polish professional footballer who plays as a goalkeeper.

== Career ==
Born in Bełchatów, Kisiel debuted in the Ekstraklasa with local side GKS Bełchatów on 23 February 2008.

In the summer 2018, Kisiel re-joined VfL Oldenburg.
