= Krzysztof Kisiel =

Polish handball coach (born 1969)

Personal information
- Nationality: Polish
- Born: 19 July 1969 (age 57) Serock, Poland

Sport
- Sport: Handball
- Current club: Wybrzeże Gdańsk (manager)

Teams managed
- Years: Team
- 2000–2004: Wisła Płock (assistant)
- 2004–2006: Wisła Płock
- 2006–2009: Piotrkowianin Piotrków Trybunalski
- 2009–2010: Warmia Olsztyn
- 2000–2004: Wisła Płock (assistant)
- 2004–2006: Wisła Płock
- 2006–2009: Piotrkowianin Piotrków Trybunalski
- 2010–2013: Wisła Płock (assistant)
- 2013: Wisła Płock
- 2013–2018: Wisła Płock (assistant)
- 2018: Wisła Płock
- 2020–2021: Wybrzeże Gdańsk

Krzysztof Kisiel (born 19 July 1969) is a Polish handball coach for Wybrzeże Gdańsk.
