= Zielony Balonik =

Coordinates: 50.0641°N 19.9409°E

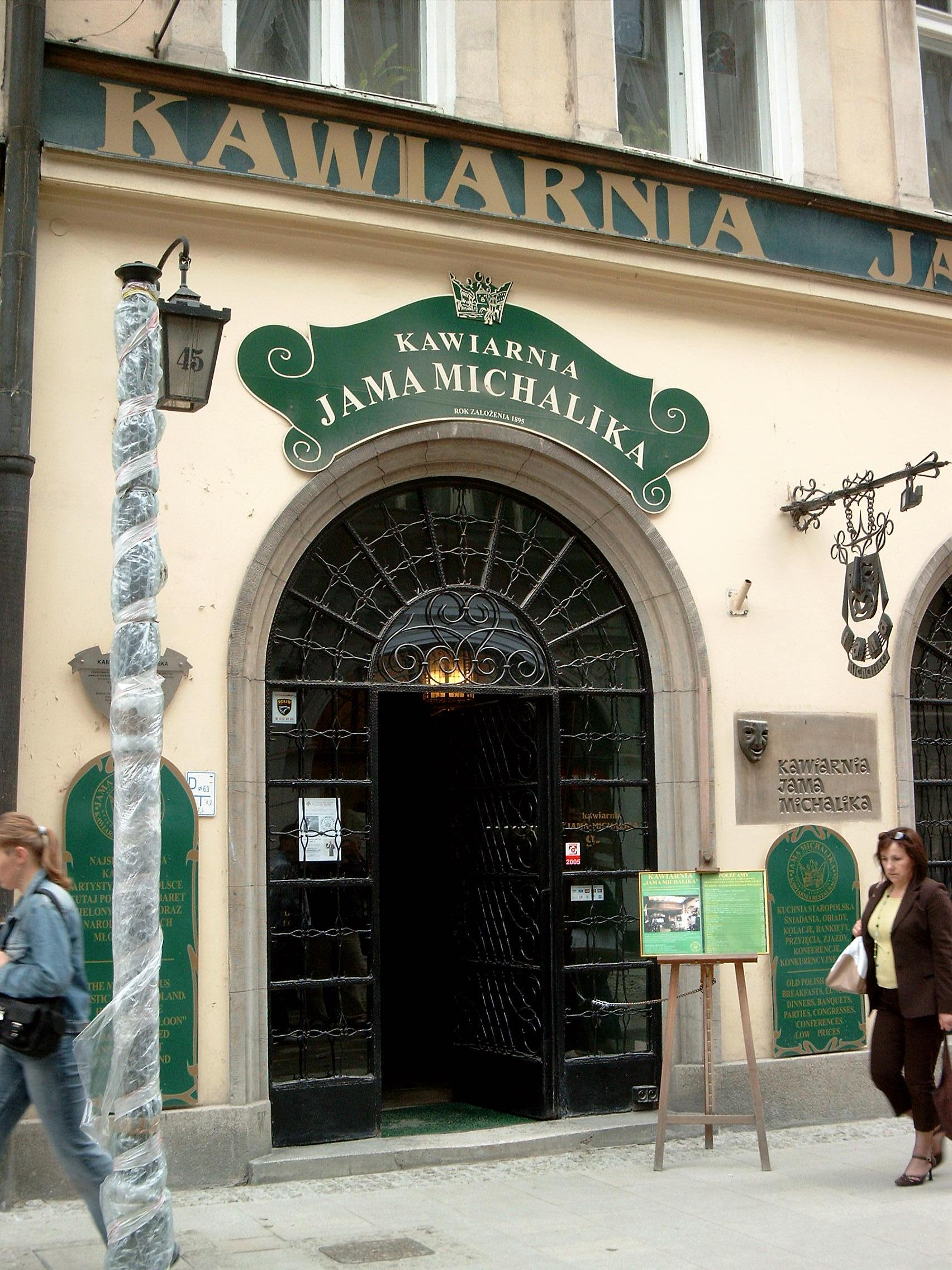
Entrance to Michalik's Den (Jama Michalika), the location of the Green Balloon (Zielony Balonik) cabaret, Kraków

Zielony Balonik (literally, the Green Balloon) was a popular literary cabaret founded in Kraków by the local poets, writers and artists during the final years of the Partitions of Poland. The venue was a gourmet restaurant of Apolinary J. Michalik called the Michalik's Den (Jama Michalika). The cabaret was founded in 1905 and ran regularly until 1912 (staged occasionally until 1915).

== History ==
The grand opening of the Green Balloon cabaret took place on 7 October 1905 in a restaurant-bakery located in the heart of Kraków Old Town, not far from the medieval St. Florian's Gate. It was an art cabaret, meant only for the cultural elite. The organizers made sure that the guests show enthusiasm; those who didn't, were no longer invited. As a result the audience consisted of a closed group of regulars, whose composition didn't change. Soon, rumors began to spread among the local bourgeoisie that the Green Balloon stage was a place of orgies, nude dancing and all manner of dissipation. Boy-Żeleński responded on behalf of Zielony Balonik by writing a bawdy, humorous poem "Pieśń dziadkowa" (Grandpas Song) confirming that indeed, it is a Sodom and Gomorrah, synonymous with impenitent sin. However, the elitist treatment carried with it a major drawback. Gradually the ground breaking stage performances became depleted of fresh new topics and captivating lyrics for the songs, and the intervention of preventive censorship in the cabaret's scripted dialogues by Austrian authorities resulted in further avoidance of any pressing political issues stemming from the foreign occupation of the country.

Over time even the regulars began to miss Balonik's earlier green humor. One additional reason for its slow but relentless disintegration was that the living conditions of contributing artists began to deteriorate under the repressive Austrian rule. The patrons turned reluctant to dig further into the mine field of political satire concerned with the suppression of freedoms. It was one of the main distinguishing features of Zielony Balonik from the French and German cabarets of the time.

The main contributors included two Masters of Ceremonies: Jan August Kisielewski, and Stanisław Sierosławski; the slew of writers such as: Witold Noskowski, Tadeusz Zakrzewski, Tadeusz Boy-Żeleński (from 1906), Adolf Nowaczyński, Edward Leszczyński, Leon Schiller, and Juliusz Osterwa; as well as a group of visual artists in charge of set-design and exhibits, including: Witold Wojtkiewicz, Kazimierz Sichulski, Karol Frycz, Henryk Szczygliński, Alfons Karpiński, Stanisław Kamocki, Stanisław Kuczborski, Stefan Filipkiewicz, Henryk Uziembło, Fryderyk Pautsch, married couple Tadeusz Rychter and his wife Bronisława Janowska who designed political puppets (1868–1953), Ludwik Puget, Ignacy Blaschke and Adam Grzymała-Siedlecki who even wrote memoirs about the beginnings of the institution, "Ludzie Zielonego Balonika", (People of the Zielony Balonik) in the periodical Teatr (issue N.9, 1951).

== See also ==
- Polish literature
- Young Poland movement

== Notes and references ==
- Aviel Roshwald, Richard Stites, European culture in the Great War: the arts, entertainment, and propaganda. Page 72. Cambridge University Press, 2002. ISBN 0-521-01324-0.
- Mark Salter, Jonathan Bousfield, Rough guide to Poland. Page 458. Publisher: Rough Guides, 2002. ISBN 1-85828-849-5
- Tadeusz Boy-Żeleński, Legenda Zielonego Balonika z perspektywy ćwierćwiecza (in) Tadeusz Boy-Żeleński Znaszli ten kraj? Introduction: T. Weiss. BN I, 246. Wrocław 2004, pp. 244–245.
- Tomasz Stępień, "Kabaret literacki" (in) Słownik literatury polskiej XX wieku. Wrocław. 1992.
