= Ivan Kisel =

Belarusian professional footballer

Personal information
- Date of birth: 28 May 1998 (age 28)
- Place of birth: Minsk, Belarus
- Height: 1.88 m (6 ft 2 in)
- Position: Defender

Team information
- Current team: BGU Minsk
- Number: 4

Youth career
- 2014–2018: BATE Borisov

Senior career*
Years	Team	Apps	(Gls)
2017–2018	BATE Borisov	0	(0)
2018–2019	Energetik-BGU Minsk	15	(1)
2019	→ Smorgon (loan)	7	(0)
2020	Sputnik Rechitsa	12	(0)
2021	Shakhtyor Petrikov	11	(1)
2022–	BGU Minsk	11	(0)

International career
2014–2015	Belarus U17	6	(0)
2016–2017	Belarus U19	6	(0)
- * Club domestic league appearances and goals as of 31 December 2023

Ivan Kisel (Belarusian: Іван Кісель; Russian: Иван Кисель; born 28 May 1998) is a Belarusian professional footballer who plays BGU Minsk.
