= Stanisław Kuczborski =

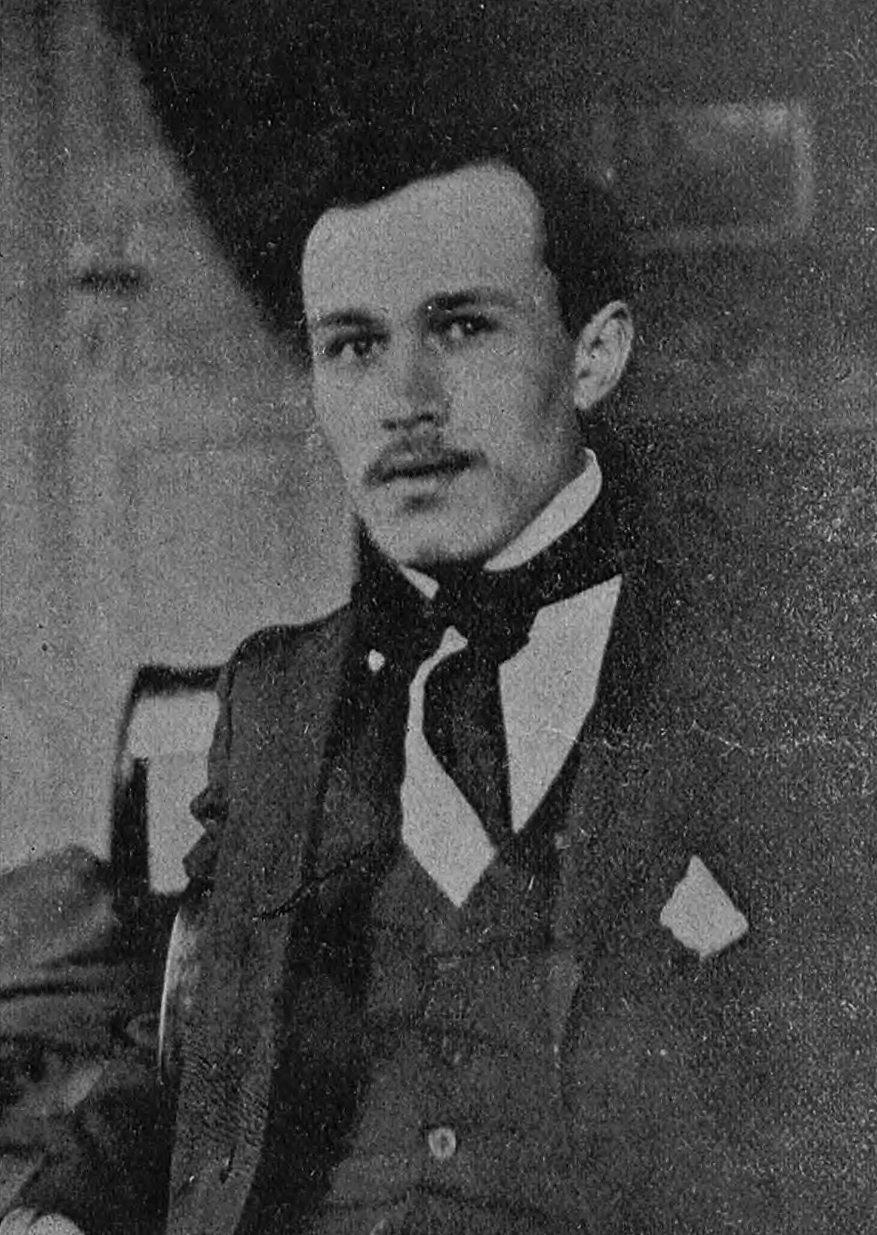

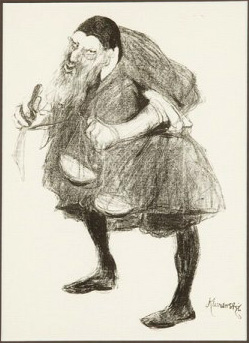
Stanisław Kuczborski: 1904 caricature of actor-director Józef Kotarbiński as Shylock in The Merchant of Venice (from Melpomene's File)

Stanisław Kuczborski (1881 in Warsaw – 1911 in Warsaw) was a Polish modernist painter, graphic artist and caricaturists. His mother, Klotylda Kuczborska (née Gierymska) was a sister of renowned painters Aleksander Gierymski and Maksymilian Gierymski. Kuczborski studied painting in Kraków at the School of Fine Arts under Leon Wyczółkowski and Jan Stanisławski before continuing his art education in Paris. He was a co-founder and participant of the legendary Zielony Balonik art-and-literary cabaret in Kraków. His lithographs published in Liberum Veto and Hrabia Wojtek, appeared in Teka Melpomeny collection (1904) about personalities in the local theatre. One of his better-known paintings inspired by the Young Poland movement is the Funeral (1904), depicting village folk from Bronowice. Kuczborski married Zofia Munk with whom he had a daughter, Irena Kuczborska (1907–1971), also a fine arts painter.
