= Stefan Kisielewski =

Polish writer and composer

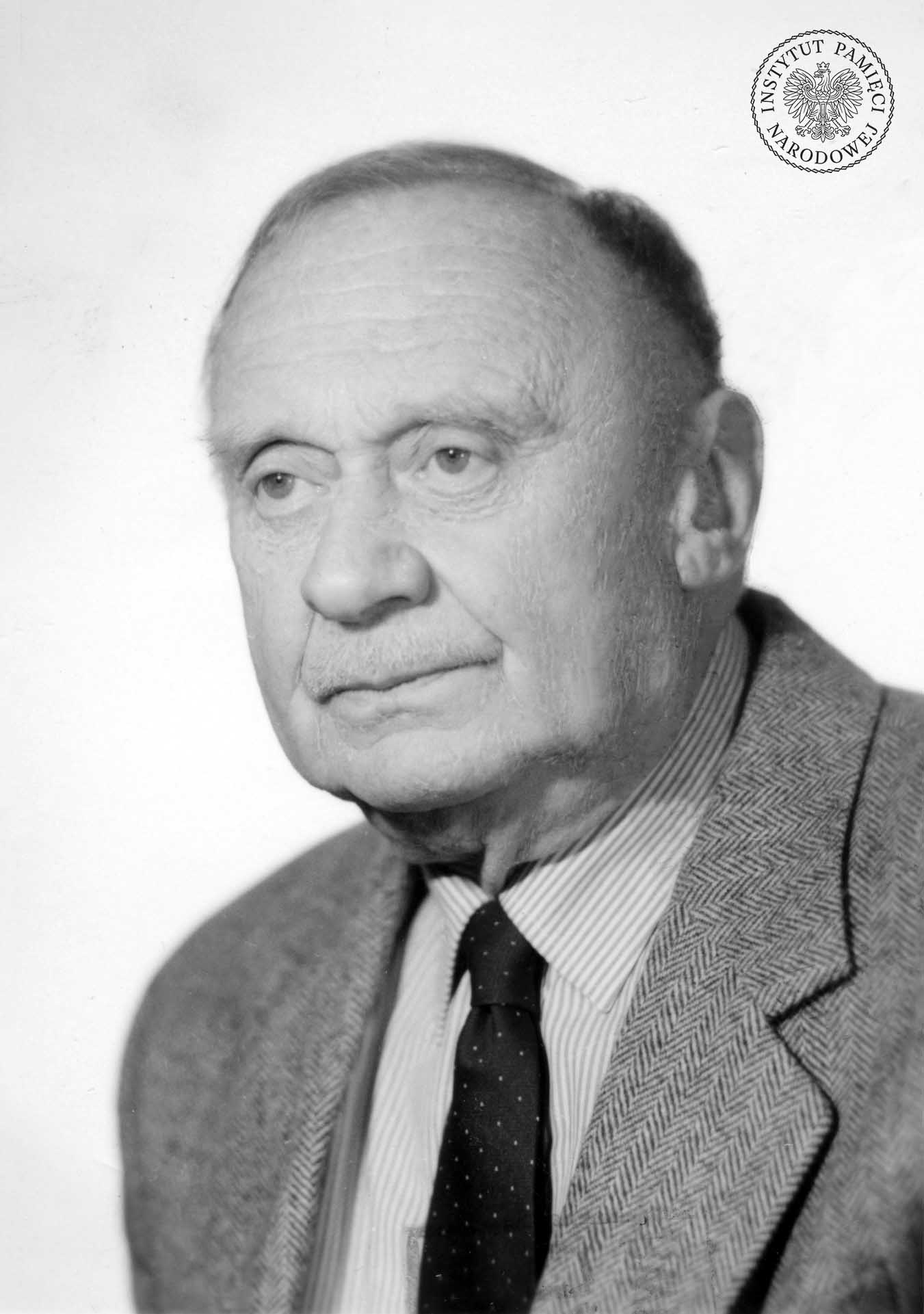
- Passport photo of Kisielewski, 1987
- Born: March 7, 1911; Warsaw, Congress Poland
- Died: September 27, 1991 (aged 80); Warsaw, Poland
- Resting place: Powązki Cemetery
- Education: University of Warsaw; Warsaw Conservatory
- Children: Wacław Kisielewski
- Relatives: Hanna Sawicka
- Writing career
- Pen name: Kisiel; Teodor Klon; Tomasz Staliński; Julia Hołyńska; Dr J.E.Baka; Jerzy Mrugacz
- Language: Polish
- Notable awards: Kisiel Prize
- Movement: Neoclassicism

Stefan Kisielewski (7 March 1911 – 27 September 1991), nicknames Kisiel, Julia Hołyńska, Teodor Klon, Tomasz Staliński, was a Polish writer, publicist, composer and politician, and one of the members of Znak, one of the founders of the Unia Polityki Realnej, the Polish libertarian and conservative political party.

== Biography ==
Kisielewski was born to a Polish father Zygmunt Kisielewski and a Jewish mother Salomea Szapiro.

In 1927 he entered the State Conservatory of Music in Warsaw, where he received three diplomas: in theory (1934, under Kazimierz Sikorski), in composition (1937, also under K. Sikorski) and in pedagogical piano (1937, under Jerzy Lefeld). He also studied Polish literature and philosophy at Warsaw University and completed his composition studies in Paris, in the years 1938–39.

As a composer, Kisielewski remained firmly rooted in French neo-classicism, although his writings supported contemporary musical trends in Poland more broadly (Thomas 2001).

His writing and political thought were generally marked by pragmatism and support for liberalism.

In 1964 he was one of the signatories of the so-called Letter of 34 to Prime Minister Józef Cyrankiewicz regarding freedom of culture. In 1968, for criticizing censorship in communist Poland (at the meeting of the Polish Writers' Union he used the designation 'dyktatura ciemniaków' – 'a dictatorship of dimwits' – which became famous in Poland), he was forbidden to publish for three years. He was also beaten up by so-called "unknown perpetrators" (a euphemism for perpetrators of criminal acts of political violence who in all likelihood were members of the Communist secret police, see also: nieznani sprawcy). He coined the aphorism "this isn't a crisis, it's the outcome" to describe the collapse of the Polish economy at that time as a result of socialism.

In 1990, together with the magazine Wprost, he established the Kisiel Prize.

== Works ==
=== Music essays ===
- Gwiazdozbiór muzyczny (1958),
- Muzyka i mózg (1974)

=== Political essays ===
- Polityka i sztuka (1949),
- Felietony zdjęte przez cenzurę – Warszawa 1998
- Rzeczy małe – Warszawa 1998
- Dzienniki – Warszawa 1997 (wydanie II)
- 100 razy głową w ścianę (Paryż 1972), Warszawa 1997
- Wołanie na puszczy – Warszawa 1997
- Testament Kisiela – Warszawa 1992
- Abecadło Kisiela – Warszawa 1990
- Na czym polega socjalizm? Stosunki Kościół-Państwo w PRL – Poznań 1990 (wydanie II)
- Kisiel przedwojenny – Warszawa 2001.

=== Various essays ===
- Rzeczy małe (1956)
- Opowiadania i podróże (1959)
- Z literackiego lamusa (1979)
- Materii pomieszanie (Londyn 1973)
- Moje dzwony trzydziestolecia (Chicago 1978)

=== Novels ===
- Sprzysiężenie (1947)
- Zbrodnia w dzielnicy Północnej (1948)
- Widziane z góry i Cienie w pieczarze (1971)
- Romans zimowy (1972)
- Śledztwo (1974)
- Ludzie z akwarium (1976)
- Przygoda w Warszawie (1977)
- Wszystko inaczej – Warszawa 1991 (wydanie IV)

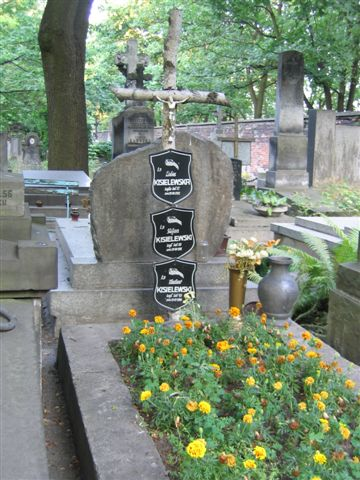
The Kisielewski family grave at the Powązki Cemetery.

=== Musical compositions ===
- Capriccio energico, for violin and piano (1956)
- Concerto, for chamber orchestra (1948)
- Concerto, for piano and orchestra (1980–91)
- Cosmos I, for orchestra (1970)
- Danse vive, for piano (1939)
- Dialogi, for 14 instruments (1970)
- Divertimento, for flute and string orchestra (1964)
- Impresja kapryśna, for flute alone (1982)
- Intermezzo, for clarinet and piano (1951)
- Kaprys wiejski [Rustic Caprice], for piano (1952)
- Kołysanka [Lullaby], for piano (1968)
- Melodia kurpiowska [Kurpian Melody], for female chorus and folk ensemble (1951)
- Perpetuum mobile, for orchestra (1955)
- Podróż w czasie [A Journey in Time], for string orchestra (1965)
- Rapsodia wiejska [Rustic Rhapsody], for chamber orchestra (1950)
- Serenade, for piano (1945, rev. 1974)
- Signały sportowe [Sports Signals], overture (1966)
- Sonata, for clarinet and, piano (1972)
- Sonata no. 1, for piano
- Sonata no. 2, for piano (1945, rev. 1955)
- Spotkania na pustyni [Meetings in a Desert], for ten players (1969)
- String Quartet (1935)
- Suite, for flute and clarinet (1961)
- Suite, for oboe and piano (1954)
- Suite, for piano (1955)
- Symfonia w kwadracie [Symphony in a Square], for orchestra (1978)
- Symphony no. 1 (1939, lost)
- Symphony no. 2 (1951)
- Symphony, for 15 players (1961)
- 3 sceny burzliwe [Three Stormy Scenes], for piano (1983)

== See also ==
- Kisiel Award
