= Bronisława Janowska =

Polish realist painter and publisher

Bronisława Rychter-Janowska
- Janowska with husband Tadeusz Rychter, c, 1900. An undated, hand-written note on the photograph reads: The work has ravaged her health, and her husband, mistreated her. Frombork Museum
- Born: Bronisława Janowska; 13 July 1868
- Died: 29 September 1953 (aged 85)
- Known for: Painter
- Movement: Realism

Bronisława Janowska or Bronisława Anna Waleria Rychter-Janowska (13 July 1868 – 29 September 1953) was a Polish realist painter and publisher associated with the Kraków-based Young Poland movement. An exceptionally prolific artist, her work is on display in many private and state collections, including the Historical Museum of Kraków, the National Museum of Poland, and the Vatican Museums.

== Life ==
She was born to the noble family of Władysław Janowski Ślepowron coat of arms, a participant in the January Uprising against the Russian domination, and his wife Malwina z Borzęckich Półkozic coat of arms. Her older brother Stanisław Janowski (1866–1942), a second husband of famous dramatist Gabriela Zapolska, was also a painter; he taught her the basics of art-making. Bronisława studied painting in Munich from 1896 to 1902.

In 1900 she married Tadeusz Rychter, a painter like herself, the son of a Lwów professor. She rejected a marriage proposal from renowned Cracovian actor Ludwik Solski, even though they loved each other, because Solski was divorced and a Catholic church wedding would be out of the question. Incidentally, her subsequent marriage to Rychter was childless and openly unhappy. It lasted only for eight years.

== Artistic career ==
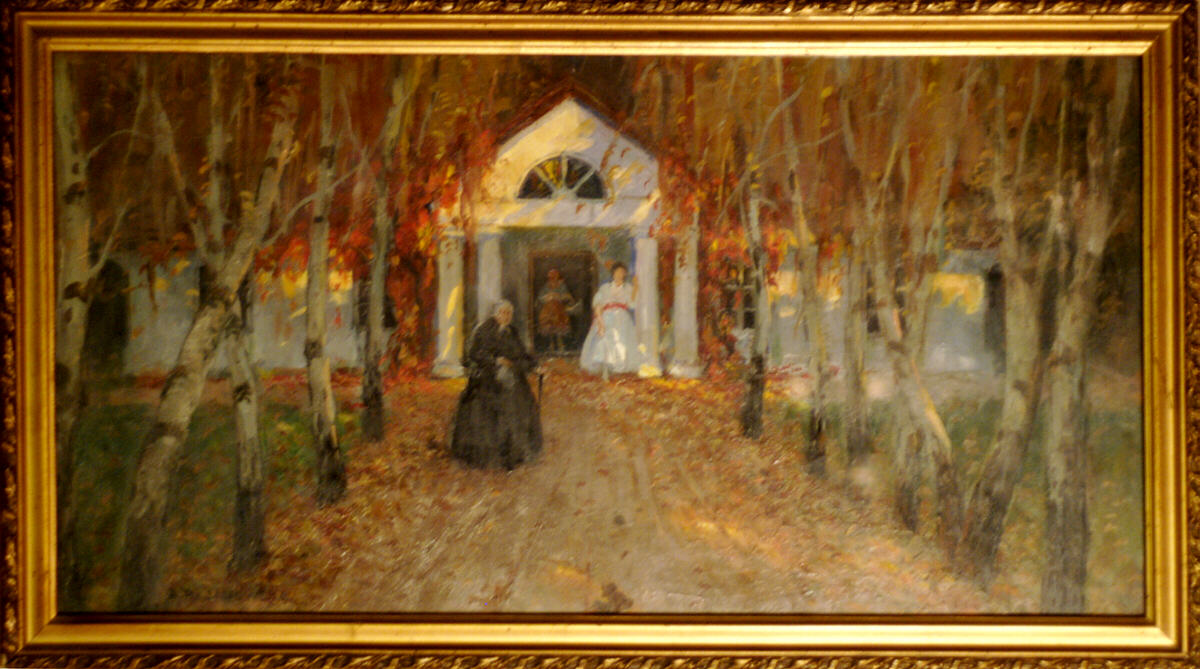
Dames in front of a manor house, oil on canvas

Bronisława left her husband in 1908 and relocated to Stary Sącz with her mother. She opened an art school, where she sparked controversy with a display of nude studies, leading to the closure of the school a year later. She traveled to Italy, North Africa, and Turkey, and stayed in Rome, Naples, and Sicily, painting landscapes, street scenes, and figurative studies. She became an active member of the Zielony Balonik Cabaret at Jama Michalika in Kraków as well as art cabarets in Lwów, designing and producing political puppets for widely popular shows against imperial censorship. She settled in Kraków at A. Dunajewskiego 1 Street in 1917, towards the end of World War I, and continued her artistic journey in sovereign Poland. Her works in oil were exhibited locally and in Lwów, where her solo show in 1927 featured 140 canvases; her paintings were also exhibited in salons in Warsaw, Prague, Vienna, Rome, Venice, and Florence. In 1939 she was awarded the Gold Cross of Merit by the state.

Rychter-Janowska stopped painting during World War II due to vision-related problems. Her brother died in 1942. She adopted a girl, Matylda Janowska. They starved during the Nazi-Soviet occupation of Poland and little improved after liberation. She received a stipend from the Ministry of Culture, and died in Kraków on 29 September 1953 at the age of 85. For most of her adult life, she kept a diary.
