= Zygmunt Kisielewski =

Polish writer

Zygmunt Jan Kisielewski
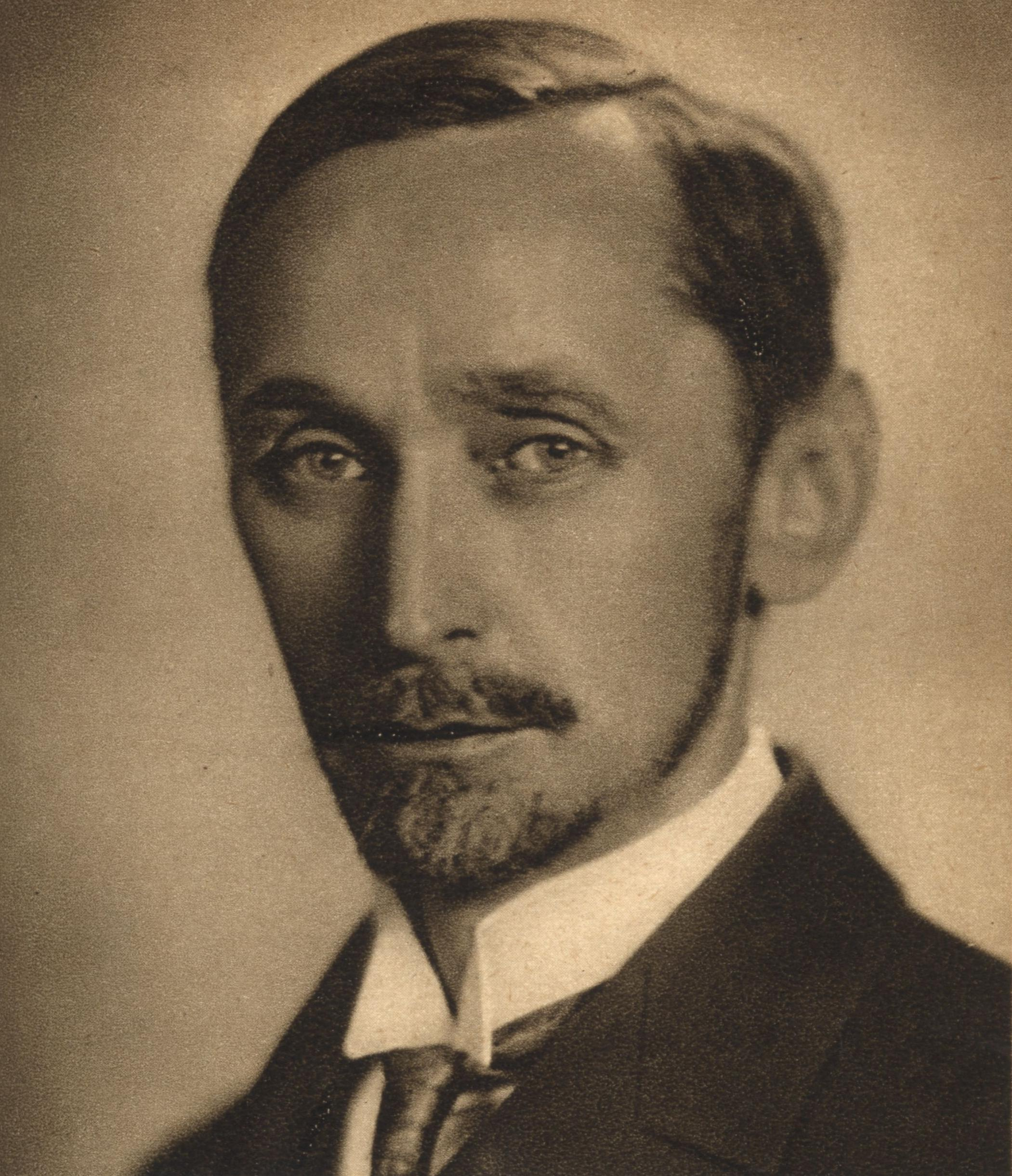
- Portrait of Kisielewski, 1933
- Born: 27 March 1882 Rzeszów, Austria-Hungary
- Died: 25 April 1942 (aged 60) Warsaw, General Government
- Resting place: Powązki Cemetery
- Language: Polish
- Children: Stefan Kisielewski
- Relatives: Jan August Kisielewski

Zygmunt Jan Kisielewski (27 March 1882 – 25 April 1942) was a Polish writer.

He is brother of Jan August and father of Stefan. During World War I (1914–1917) he was a combatant in the Polish Legions. He was an editor of Robotnik from 1918 to 1925. He also authored books on social-national and military subjects. His memoir is entitled Poranek.
