= Józef Kisielewski =

- Born: Józef Wladyslaw Wyktor Kisielewski; 26 February 1905; Mostyska, Kingdom of Galicia and Lodomeria, Austria-Hungary
- Died: 20 July 1966 (aged 61); Bandon, County, Cork, Ireland
- Education: Adam Mickiewicz University
- Occupations: Writer; journalist; politician
- Political party: National Party
- Spouse(s): Maria Szmańda (m. 1928; died 1944) Erica O'Donnell (m. 1958)
- Children: 2

Józef Kisielewski (26 February 1905 – 20 July 1966) was a Polish writer, journalist and National Party politician.

== Biography ==
Józef Wladyslaw Wyktor Kisielewski was born on 26 February 1905 in Mostyska, Austria-Hungary (present-day Ukraine) to Tadeusza Kisielewski and Stanisławy Kisielewska (née Studzińskich).

Kisielewski studied Polish Language at Adam Mickiewicz University. After graduation, in 1929, he worked as a secretary in a Roman Catholic weekly Przewodnik Katolicki, then, in 1931 became editor-in-chief of the Tecza monthly. Also, his articles were published in a right-wing weekly Prosto z mostu.

In the years 1937 and 1938 Kisielewski went on a series of trips across then-northern Germany, from Berlin, through Hanover, Hamburg, and Stettin to Leba. In the summer of 1939, soon before the outbreak of the Second World War, his book Earth Gathers the Ashes (Polish: Ziemia gromadzi prochy) was published. The book is a report of his trips, it critically analyzes everyday life of prewar Nazi Germany and accentuates Slavic past of large parts of Germany. Kisielewski was aware of the growing power of Nazi military machine, he correctly predicted that war would start soon. The book was banned by German occupiers of Poland, it was reprinted by Polish anti-Nazi resistance in 1943 and the publication was widely popular.

In September 1939 Jozef Kisielewski, who was well aware that the Germans wanted to capture and kill him for the book, escaped to Romania, then to France and Great Britain. Between 1946 and 1949 he published the Przegląd Polski weekly, then became director of the Roman Catholic Publishing House "Veritas". Also, he co-produced magazines Życie and Poland and Germany.

== Personal life ==
In 1928, Kisielewski married Maria Szmańda (née Lisiecka; died 1944) a People's Libraries Society activist and writer. Szmańda was the widow of Jan Szmańda and the sister of Arkadiusz Lisiecki.

In 1958, Kisielewski married Erica O'Donnell (1920–1999), an Irish art historian and former SOE officer. Kisielewski and O'Donnell had two children.

On 20 July 1966 Kisielewski died at a nursing home in Bandon, County Cork, and is buried at Gunnersbury Cemetery, London.

== Bibliography ==
- "Ocalona garstka popiołu - Pamięci Józefa Kisielewskiego." - 1966 "Dziennik Polski" Marian Czuchnowski
- "W kręgu przyjaźni" - A. Rogalski Warszawa 1983, s. 69-88
- "Wielkopolski Słownik Biograficzny" Krystyna Sroczyńska 1981
