= Gisel =

Gisel گيسل
- Village
- Location within Iran
- Coordinates: 36°50′08″N 49°55′45″E
- Country: Iran
- Province: Gilan
- County: Siahkal
- Bakhsh: Deylaman
- Rural District: Deylaman

Population (2016)
  - Total: 84
- Time zone: UTC+3:30 (IRST)

Gisel (Persian: گيسل, also Romanized as Gīsel and Gisal; also known as Kīseh and Kīsel) is a village in Deylaman Rural District, Deylaman District, Siahkal County, Gilan Province, Iran. At the 2016 census, its population was 84, in 31 families. Down from 114 people in 2006.
