= Jan August Kisielewski =

Polish playwright

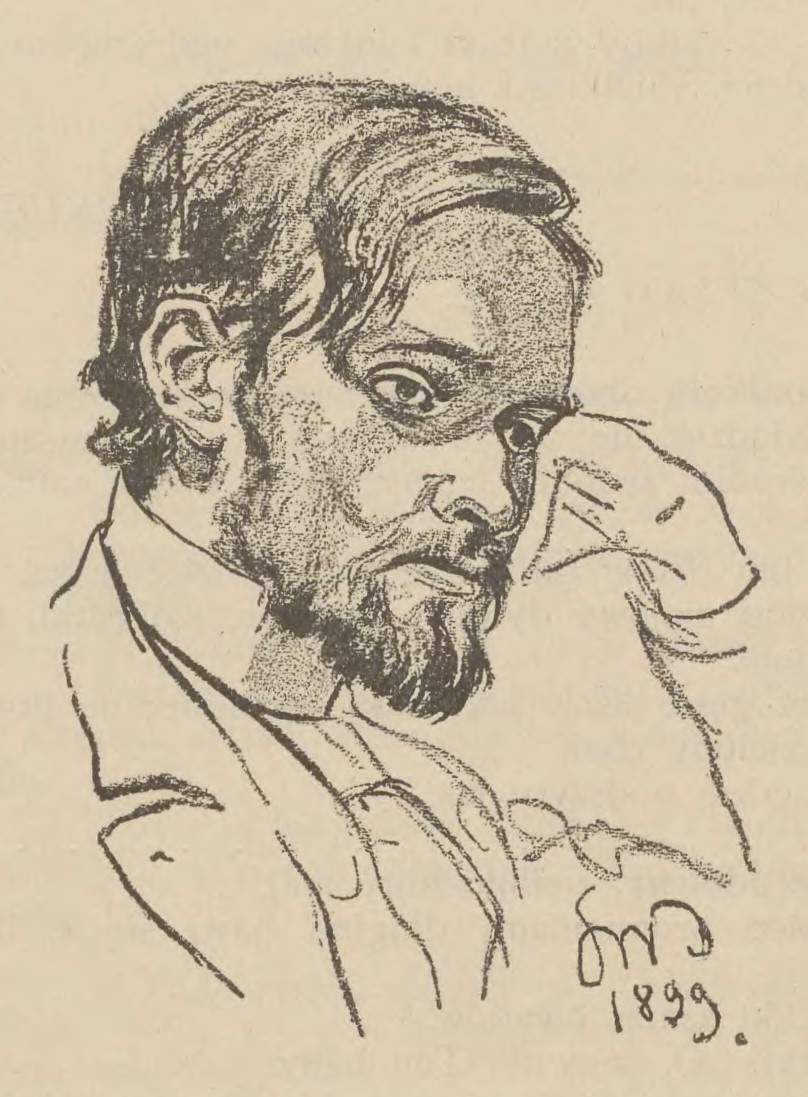
- Portrait of Kisielewski by Stanisław Wyspiański, 1899
- Born: 8 February 1876; Rzeszów, Austria-Hungary
- Died: 29 January 1918 (aged 41); Warsaw, Kingdom of Poland
- Resting place: Powązki Cemetery
- Education: Jagiellonian University
- Relatives: Zygmunt Kisielewski
- Writing career
- Language: Polish
- Literary movement: Young Poland

Jan August Kisielewski (8 February 1876 – 29 January 1918) was a Polish writer, essayist and playwright associated with the Young Poland literary movement at the turn of the century.

He was the co-founder of a legendary literary cabaret Zielony Balonik in Kraków under the Austrian rule during the final years of the Partitions of Poland. Jan August Kisielewski was a brother of Zygmunt Kisielewski of the Polish Legions in World War I, also a writer.

== Plays by Jan August Kisielewski ==
- Parias (Pariah), 1896 – lost
- Karykatury (Caricatures), 1898
- W sieci (In the Net), 1896
- Ostatnie spotkanie (The Last Meeting), 1896
- Sonata, 1901
- Komedia miłości i cnoty (The Comedy of Love and Chastity), 1903 – unfinished
