= Stained Glass Museum, Kraków =

Coordinates: 50°03′32″N 19°55′32″E

- Pracownia i Muzeum Witrażu
- Established: Workshop: 1902; 124 years ago Museum: 2004; 22 years ago
- Location: al. Krasińskiego 23, 31-111 Kraków, Poland
- Type: Art museum
- Website: muzeumwitrazu.pl

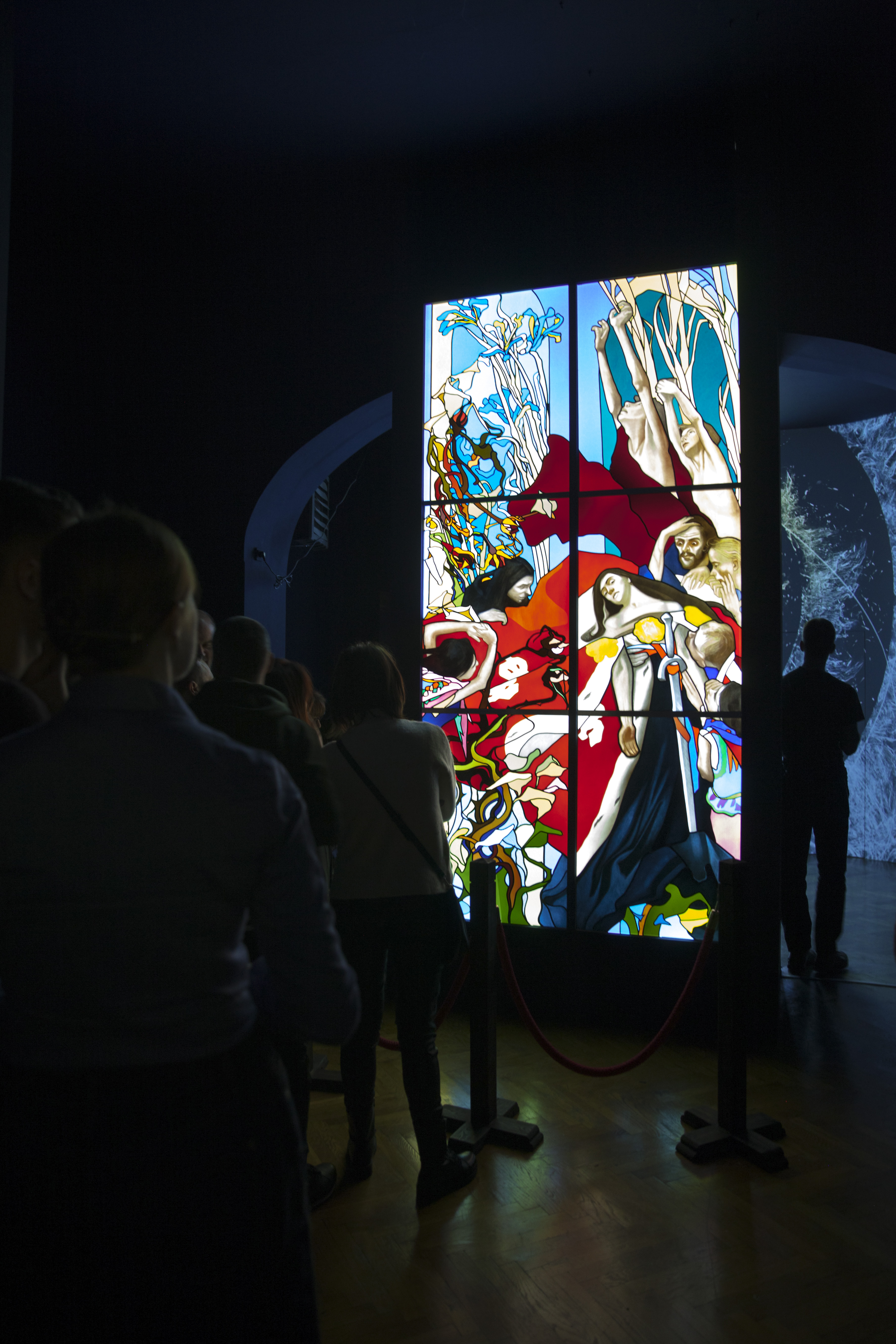
"Polonia" in the Gallery of Young Poland's Stained Glass Masters

Stained Glass Workshop and Museum (Polish: Pracownia i Muzeum Witrażu) is a specialty museum in Kraków, Poland dedicated to stained glass art and history.

== Origin and mission ==
Stained glass museum was founded in 2004 by Piotr Ostrowski, a visual artist, in order to combine producing stained glass with education and exhibition work in an effort to popularize the technique.

It is connected to a historical workshop founded in 1902, therefore it enables visitors to witness the whole production process and observe artisans at work. Museum also owns the biggest collection of stained glass related objects in Central and Eastern Europe, part of which can be viewed in the museum's permanent exhibition, Gallery of Young Poland's Stained Glass Masters. The museum also has a temporary exhibition space intended to showcase a modern approach to stained glass and its use as a medium in contemporary art, in contrast to the historical dimension of the permanent exhibition and the historic studio.

In 2017 Museum started the “In the making” cycle - a long term effort in producing a unique collection of stained glass art, combining historical designs and cooperations with some of the most renowned modern glass artists from around the world. Every project is considered an equivalent to a temporary exhibition - museum visitors are able to observe every stage of production live.

== History of the workshop ==
Krakowski Zakład Witrażów S.G. Żelenski (Cracov Stained Glass Workshop S.G. Zelenski) was the first significant stained glass workshop in Poland, established by an architect, Stanisław Gabriel Żeleński. The building was constructed in 1906–1907 on his initiative and designed to encompass very specific needs of stained glass making. Thanks to preserving the original decor and layout it still conveys the unique early XX century atmosphere. Cracovian studio collaborated with some of the most renowned artists representing the Young Poland movement, including Stanisław Wyspiański and Józef Mehoffer.

Żeleński died in 1914 in one of the first battles of World War I. After his passing, his wife Izabela took charge of the enterprise and managed to establish herself as a skillful businesswoman.

In 1952, the workshop was nationalized and for the following decades remained in the hands of various worker cooperatives, until the political transformation of the 90s. In 2000 the workshop was bought by Piotr Ostrowski, who established the Stained Glass Museum.
