= Mehoffer stained glass windows in Fribourg Cathedral =

Art Nouveau stained glass cycle by Józef Mehoffer (1895–1936)

The Mehoffer stained glass windows are a cycle of thirteen stained glass compositions created by the Polish painter Józef Mehoffer (1869–1946) between 1895 and 1936 for the Cathedral of St. Nicholas in Fribourg, Switzerland. Executed over more than four decades by the Fribourg workshop of Kirsch & Fleckner, the cycle is widely regarded as one of the major achievements of European Art Nouveau stained glass and as Mehoffer's principal work. Its best-known window, The Martyrs, was awarded a gold medal at the 1900 Paris World's Fair.

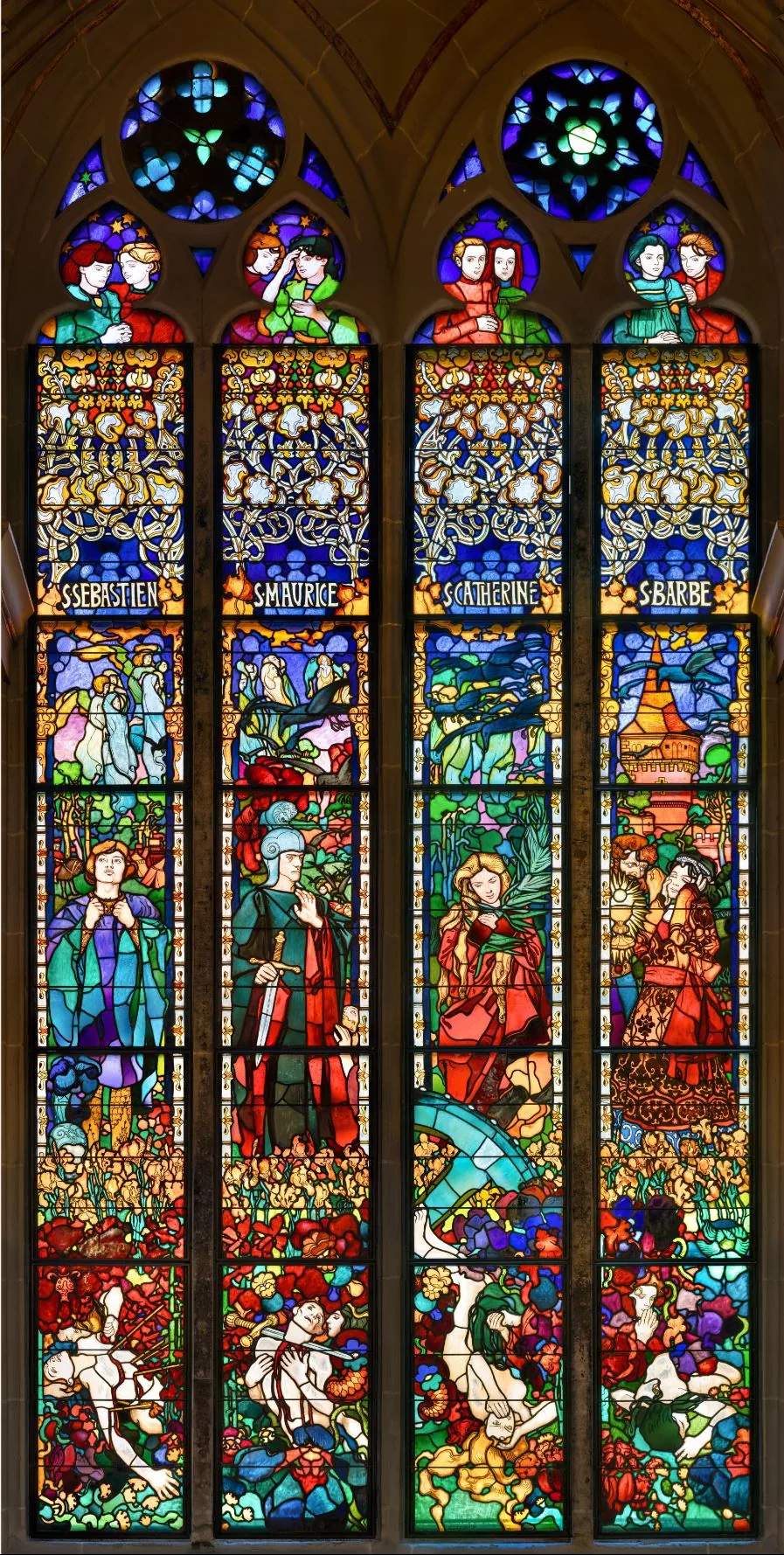
The Martyrs (1901), awarded a gold medal at the 1900 Paris World's Fair

== Origins and competition ==
The renewal of the glazing of the then collegiate church of St. Nicholas was initiated in 1892 by the local Confraternity of the Blessed Sacrament. An international competition was announced in 1895, advised by the leading Swiss art historian Johann Rudolf Rahn. The jury ranked highest the design The Apostles, submitted by a then-unknown 25-year-old artist from Kraków. The first window was installed in November 1896, beginning a collaboration that lasted four decades. In 1924 the collegiate church was elevated to the rank of cathedral of the Diocese of Lausanne, Geneva and Fribourg.

== The cycle ==
The cycle was produced in two main phases. In the first (c. 1896–1919), Mehoffer glazed the two-light windows of the side-aisle chapels: The Apostles, Our Lady of Victory, The Martyrs, The Blessed Sacrament, The Adoration of the Magi, The Saints, Deacons and Bishops, and Blessed Nicholas of Flüe. In the second (1920s–1930s), he designed the presbytery decoration: a three-window Trinitarian programme (God the Father, God the Son, The Holy Spirit) and two "historical" windows, Ecclesiastical Fribourg and Secular Fribourg. The installation of the last two in the summer of 1936 completed the cycle.

All the windows were made by the Fribourg workshop of Kirsch & Fleckner, with which Mehoffer worked closely, personally selecting the glass. The preparatory cartoons and studies survive largely in the National Museum in Kraków, which has exhibited them.

== Artistic character ==
Mehoffer treated the lead came not as a structural necessity but as an autonomous graphic line, enclosing flat colour fields in a manner close to cloisonné. He worked mainly in pot-metal antique glass, with modelling in Schwarzlot (vitreous black) and silver stain, using glass of varying thickness and texture to refract light within the body of the glass. Stylistically the cycle evolved from the soft, pastel Art Nouveau of the earliest windows, through the saturated, dramatic decoration of the mature windows (The Martyrs), to the simplified, monumental forms close to Art Deco in the presbytery. Scholars note Mehoffer's introduction of Polish folk motifs and physiognomies into a Swiss cathedral, linking the cycle to the Young Poland movement.

== List of windows ==
Stained glass windows by Józef Mehoffer in St. Nicholas Cathedral, Fribourg
No.	Title	Installed	Location
1	The Apostles	1896	north-aisle chapel (first window of the cycle)
2	Our Lady of Victory	1898	south-aisle chapel
3	The Martyrs	1901	north-aisle chapel
4	The Blessed Sacrament	1901	south-aisle chapel
5	The Adoration of the Magi	1905	north-aisle chapel
6	The Saints (St Anne window)	1910	south-aisle chapel
7	Deacons and Bishops	c. 1917	north-aisle chapel
8	Blessed Nicholas of Flüe	c. 1919	south-aisle chapel
9	God the Father	1926	central presbytery window
10	God the Son	c. 1926	presbytery
11	The Holy Spirit	c. 1926	presbytery
12	Ecclesiastical Fribourg	1936	presbytery ("historical" window)
13	Secular Fribourg	1936	presbytery ("historical" window)

Installation dates follow the scholarly literature; individual dates vary between sources.

== Reception and significance ==
The Fribourg cycle brought Mehoffer European renown during his lifetime. The Martyrs won a gold medal at the 1900 Paris World's Fair, and the project was widely discussed in both the Swiss press (Joseph Berthier in La Liberté; Alexandre Cingria) and the Polish press as an example of Polish art abroad. The windows are often cited as evidence that stained glass could rival easel painting in artistic standing.

== Conservation ==
The windows are maintained under a permanent conservation programme and protected externally by protective glazing (Schutzverglasung). The archive of the Kirsch & Fleckner workshop, essential for technical research, was deposited at the Romont Glass Museum in 1991.

== Gallery ==
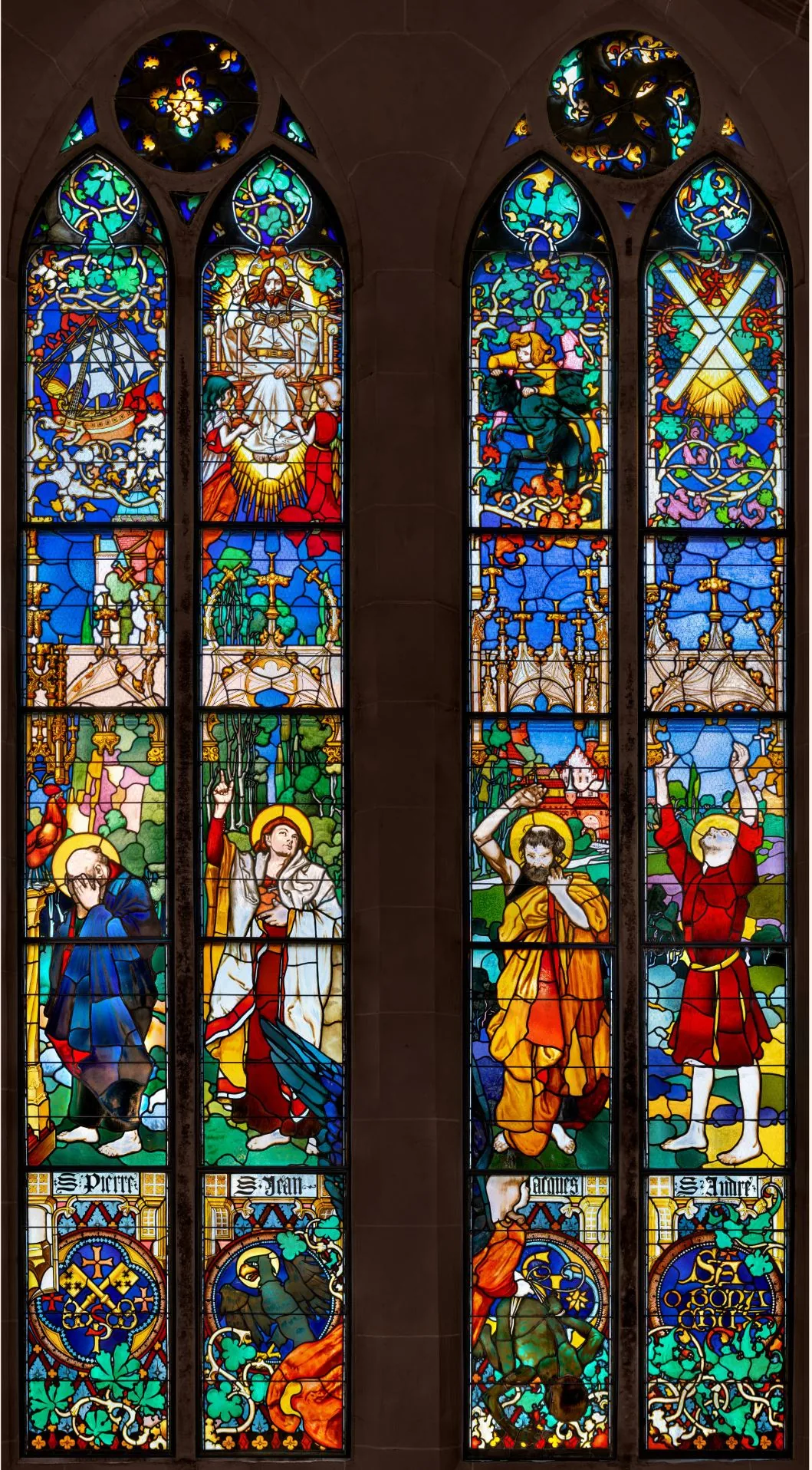
The Apostles (1896)

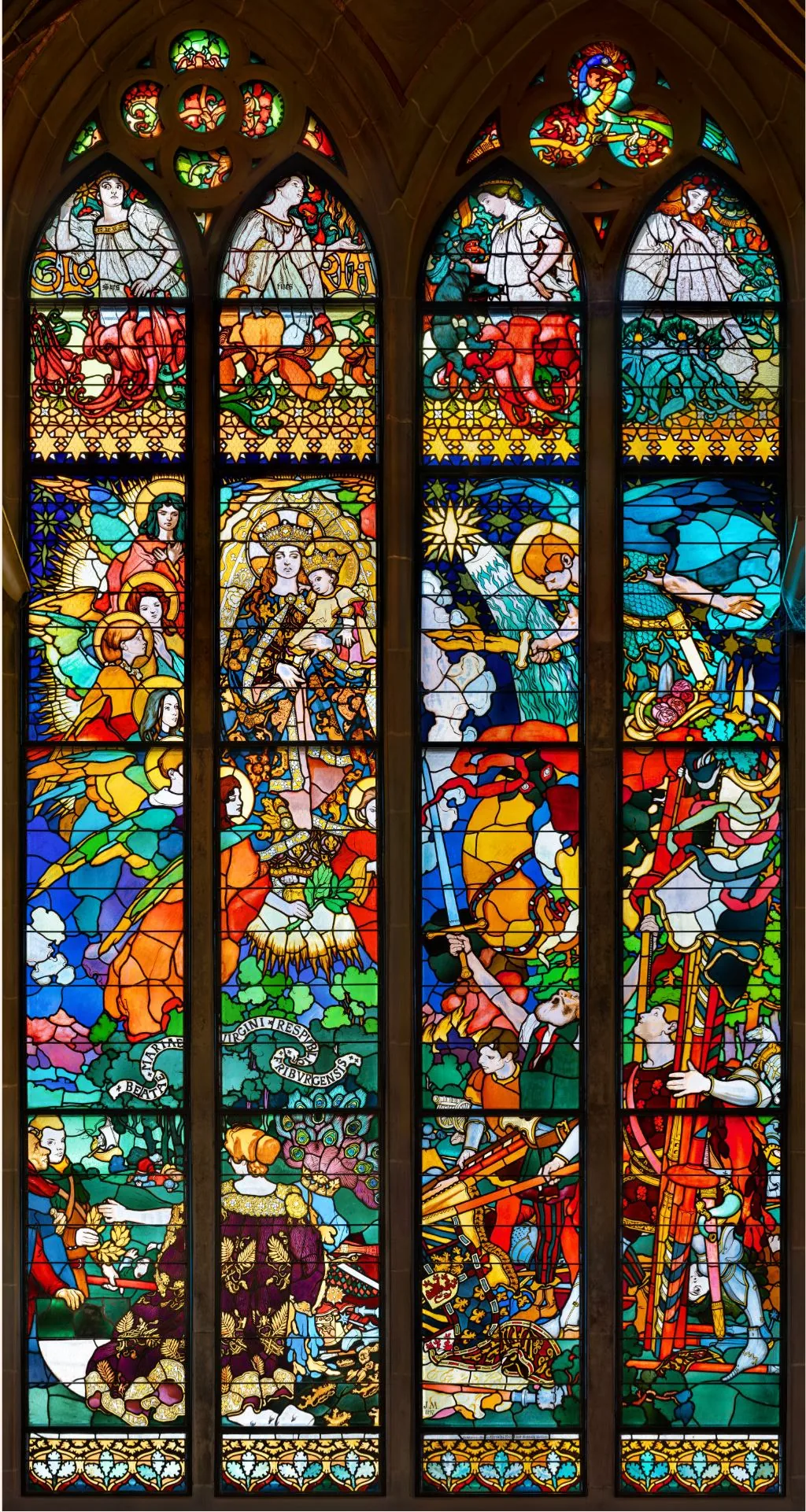
Our Lady of Victory (1898)

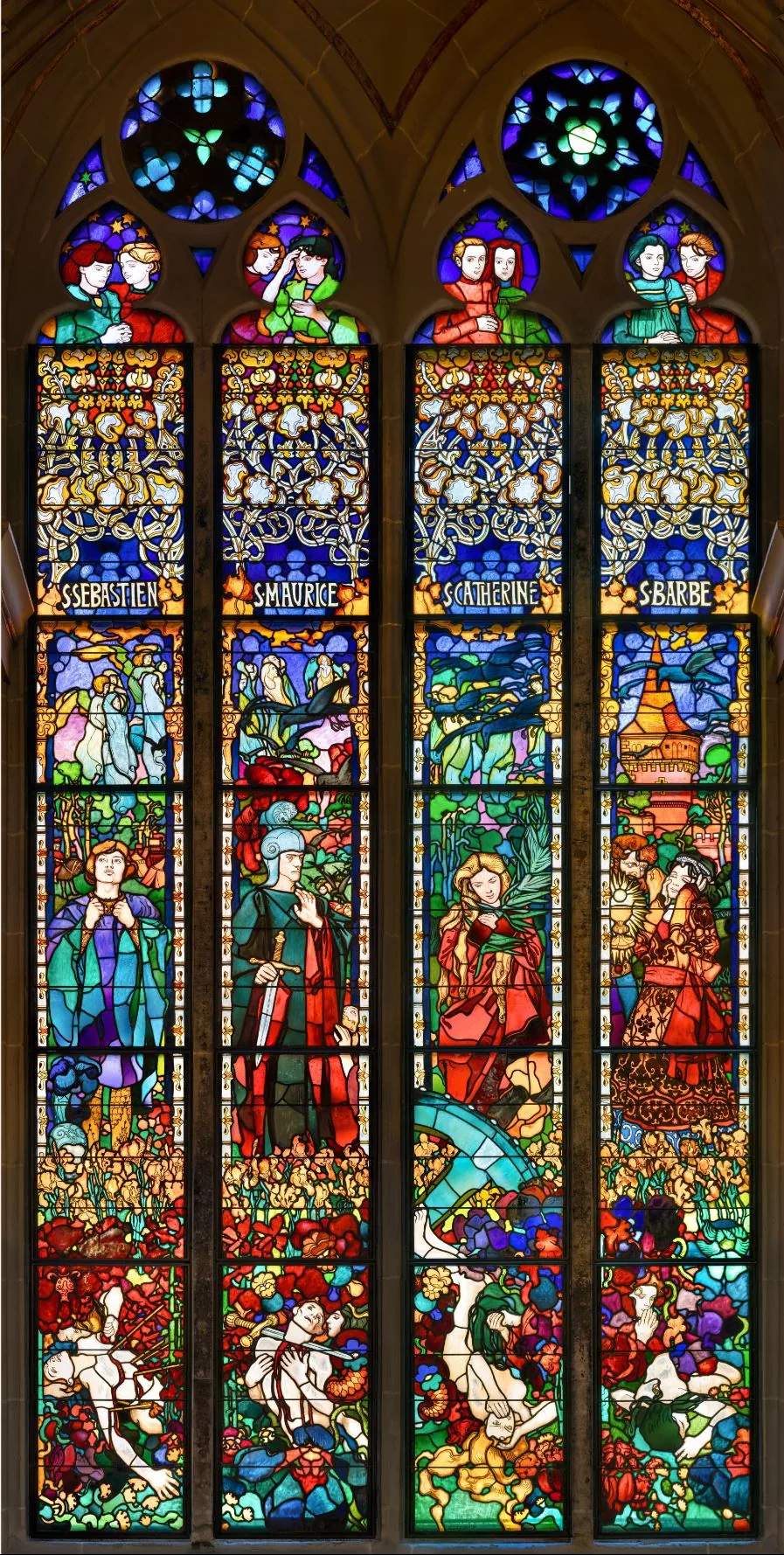
The Martyrs (1901)

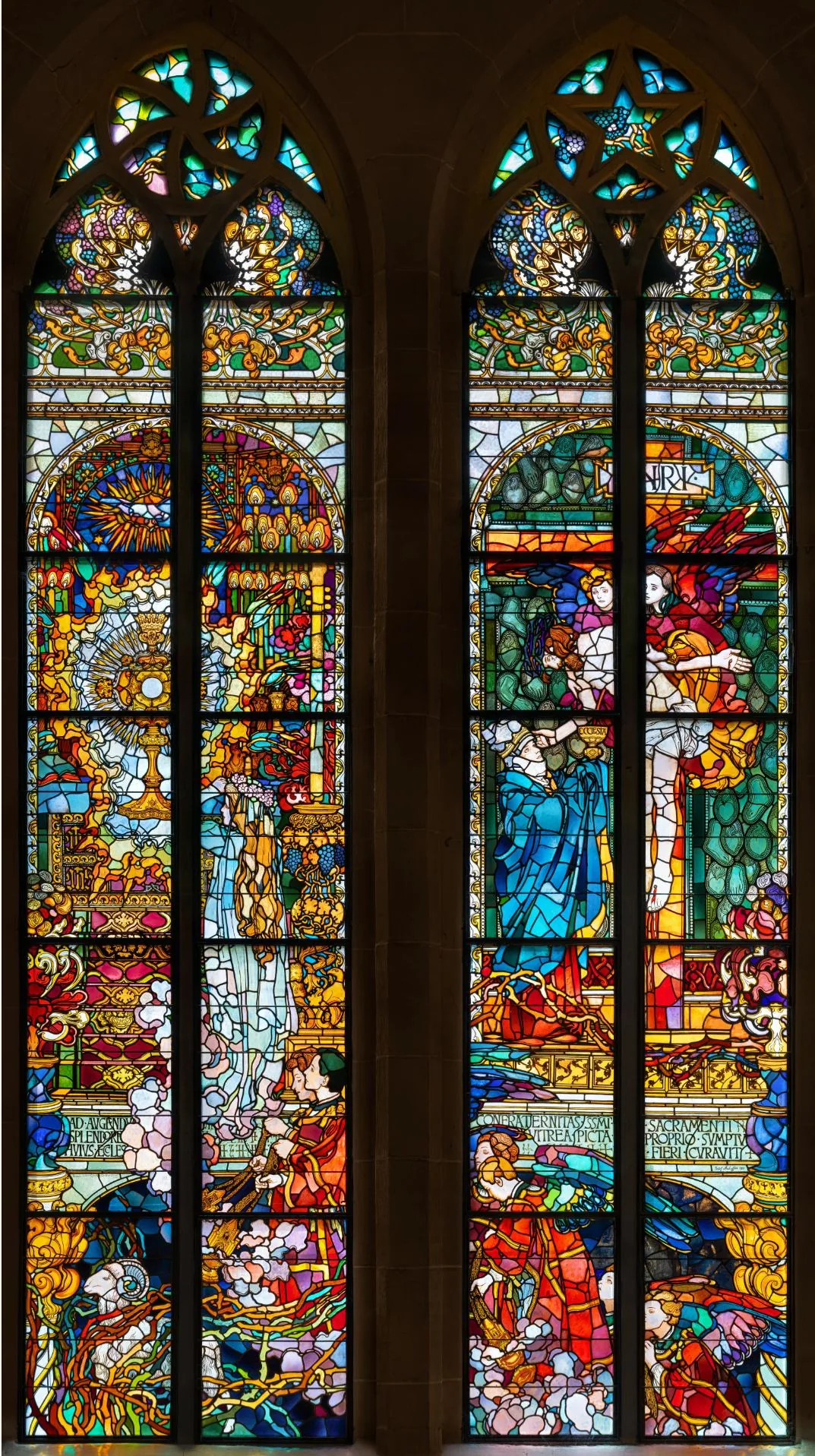
The Blessed Sacrament (1901)

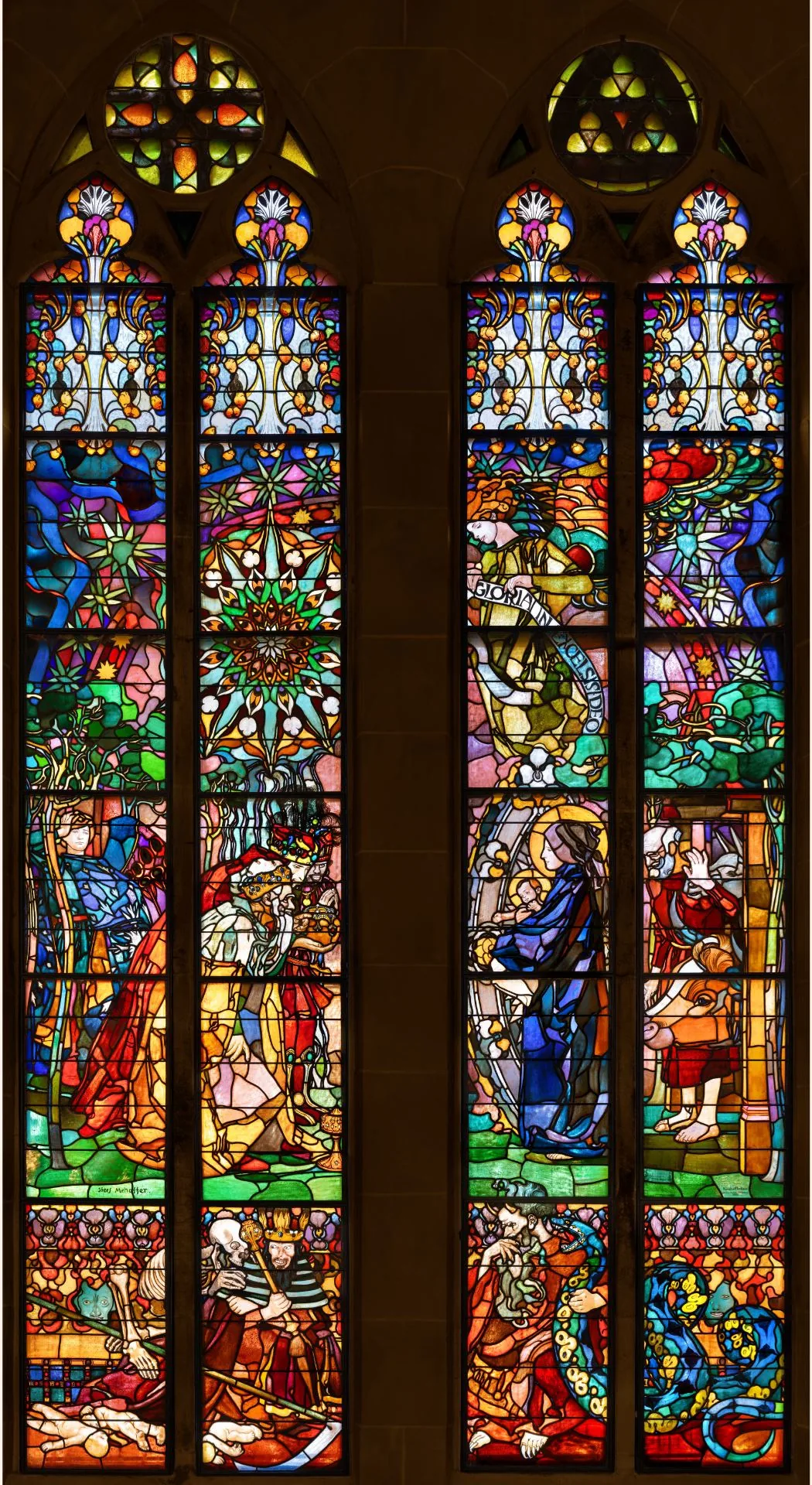
The Adoration of the Magi (1905)

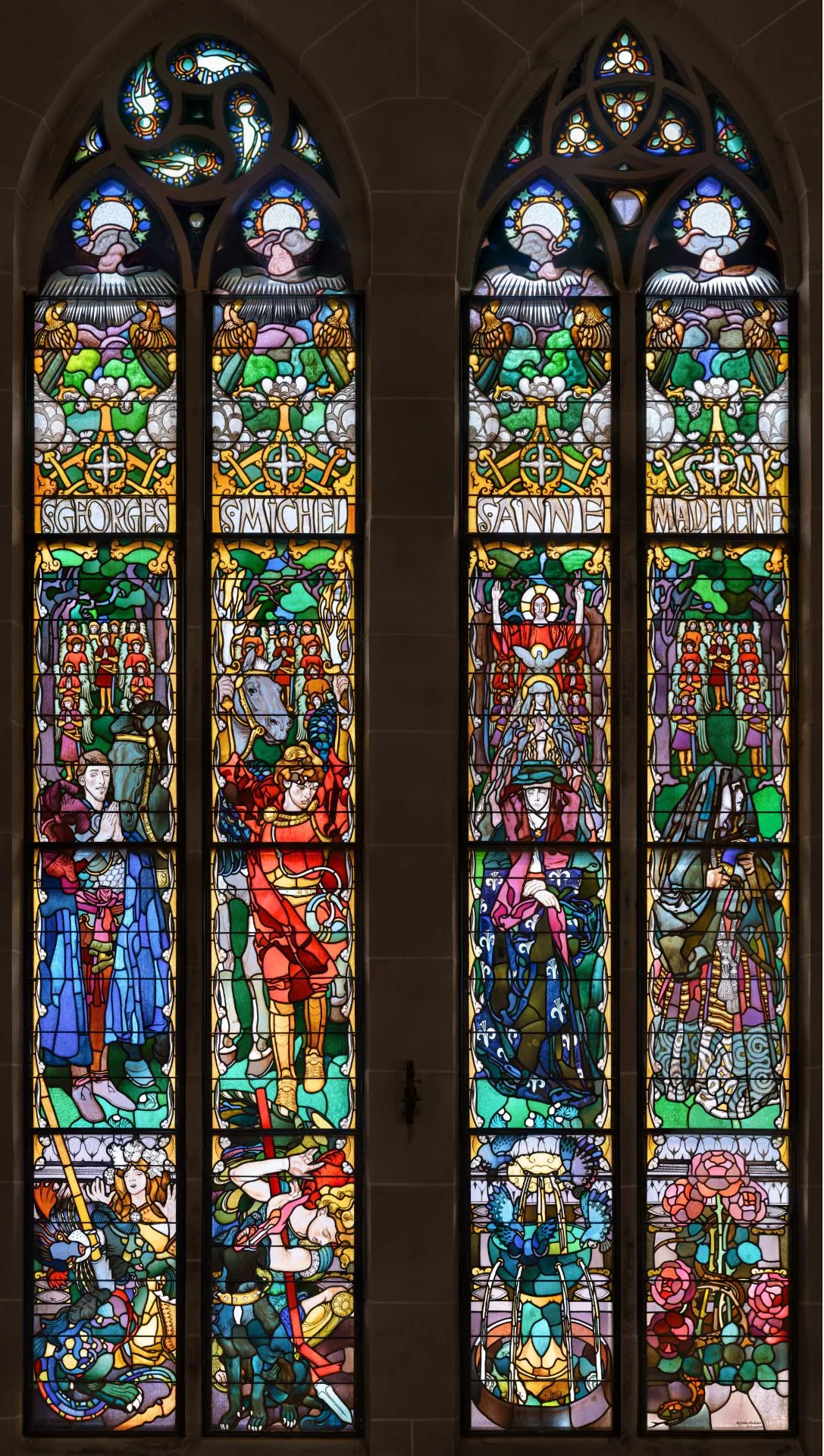
The Saints (1910)

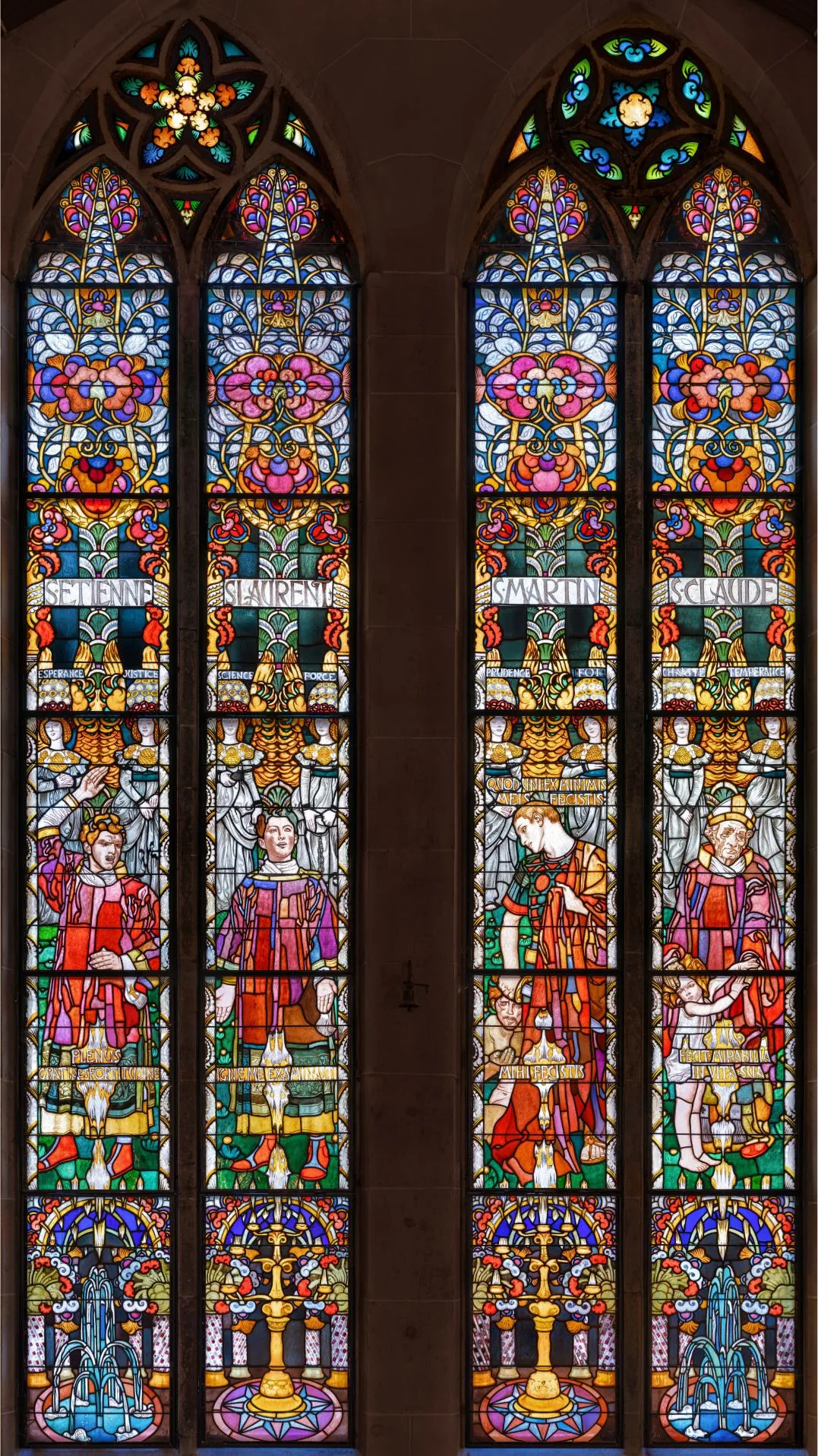
Deacons and Bishops (c. 1917)

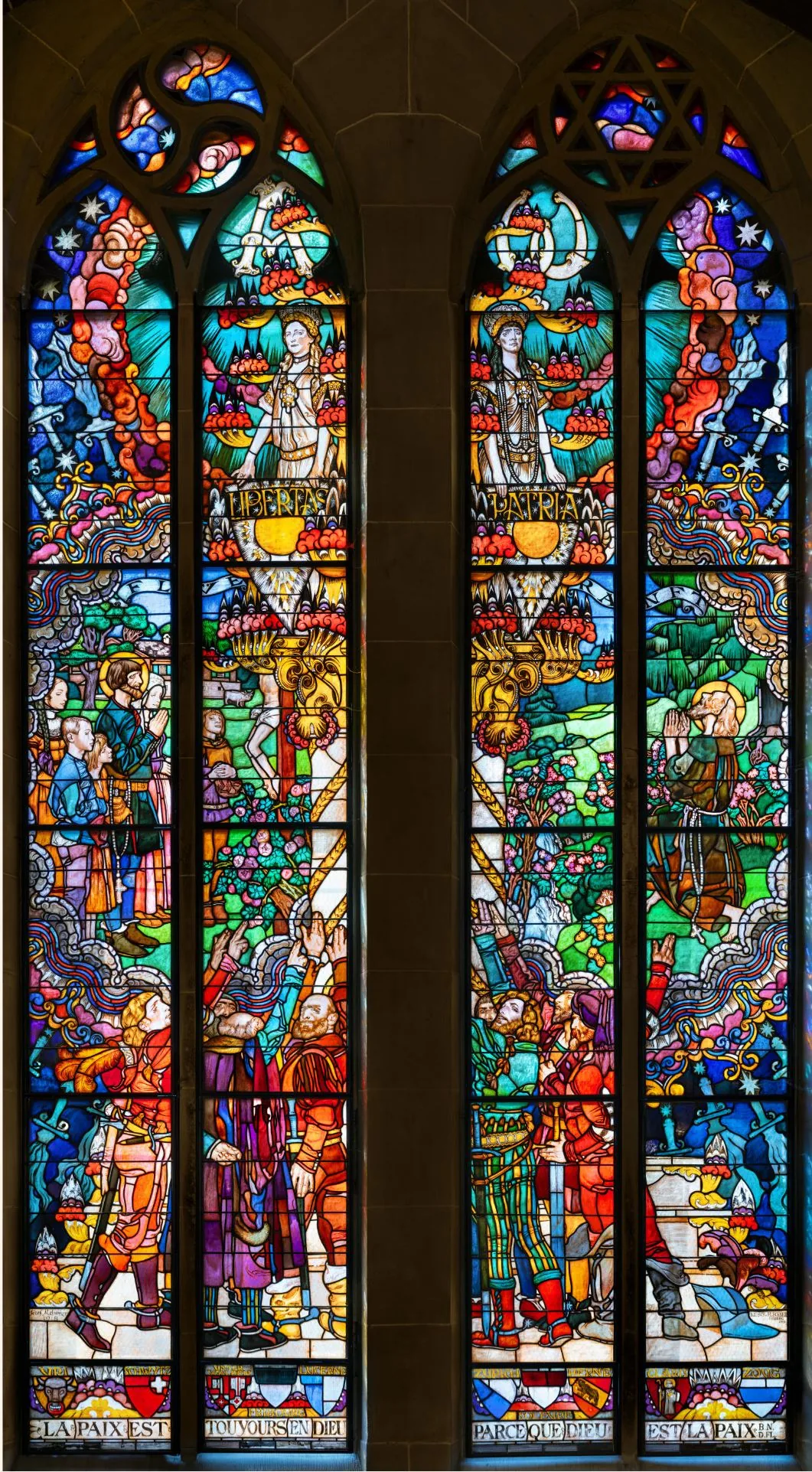
Blessed Nicholas of Flüe (c. 1919)

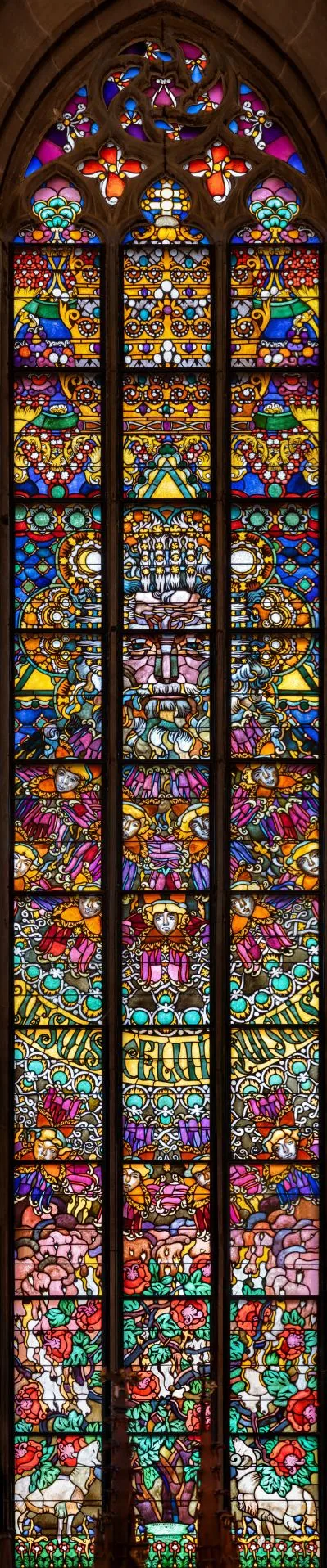
God the Father (1926)

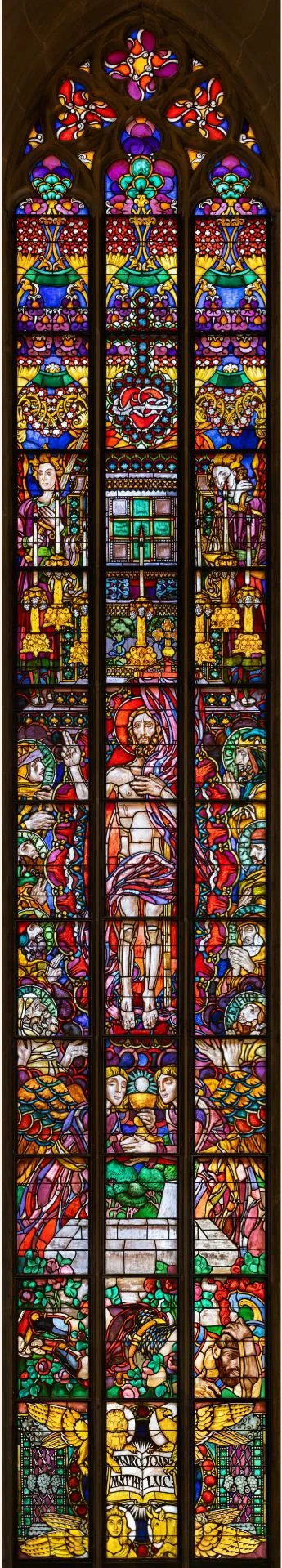
God the Son (c. 1926)

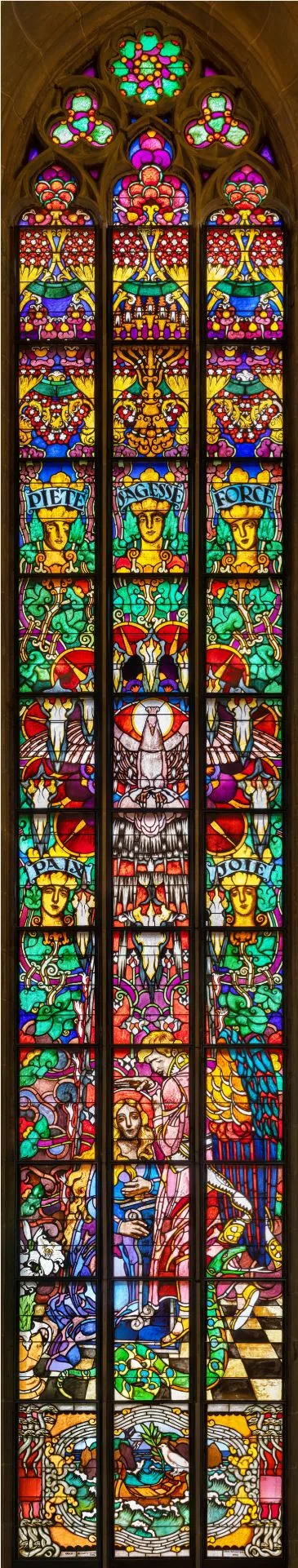
The Holy Spirit (c. 1926)

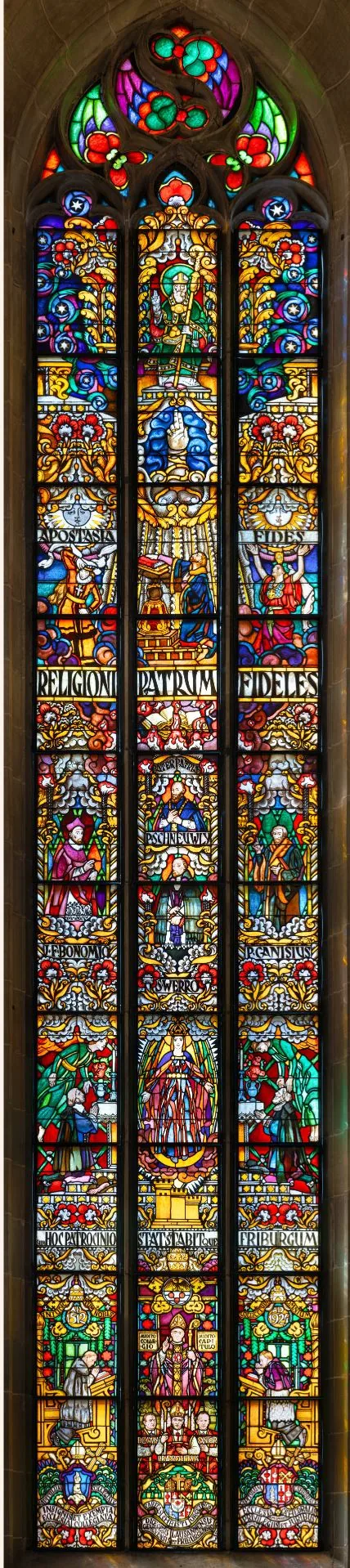
Ecclesiastical Fribourg (1936)

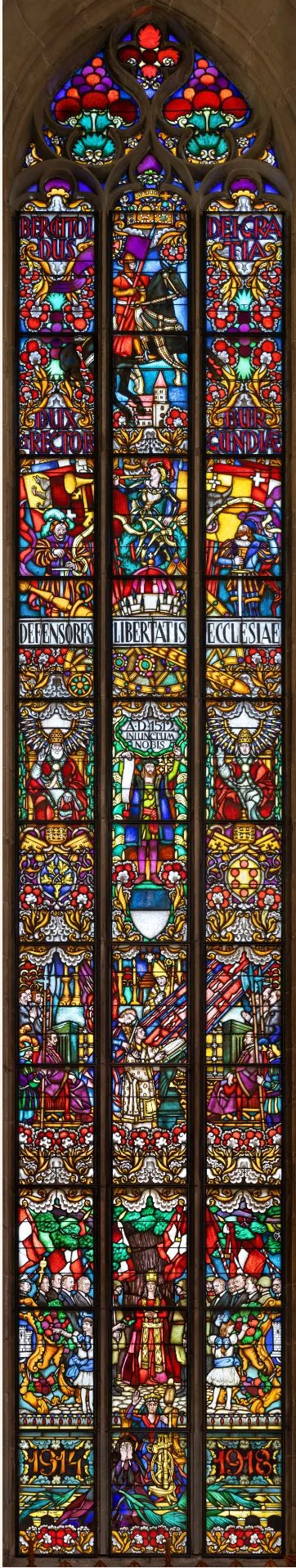
Secular Fribourg (1936)
