= Fribourg Cathedral =

- Cathedral of St Nicholas, Fribourg
- Cathédrale St-Nicolas
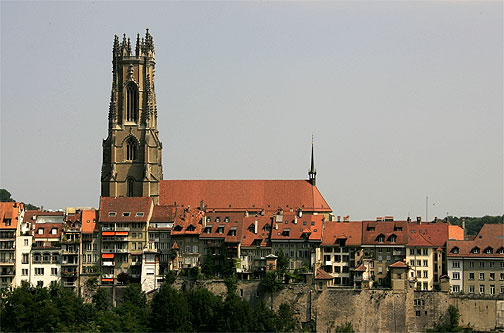
- Fribourg Cathedral
- 46°48′22″N 7°9′47″E
- Location: Fribourg
- Country: Switzerland
- Denomination: Roman Catholic
- Website: Website

History
- Status: Active
- Founded: 1283

Architecture
- Functional status: Parish church Cathedral (since 1925)
- Style: Gothic architecture
- Completed: 1490

Administration
- Diocese: Lausanne, Geneva and Fribourg

Clergy
- Bishop: Charles Morerod

Fribourg Cathedral (French: Cathédrale Saint-Nicolas de Fribourg) is a Roman Catholic cathedral in Fribourg, Switzerland. Built between 1283 and 1490 in the Gothic style, it occupies an elevated position overlooking the city. The cathedral is the episcopal seat of the Diocese of Lausanne, Geneva and Fribourg.

== History ==
Construction of the cathedral took place between 1283 and 1490, during which it was built in the Gothic style. Its bell tower rises to a height of 74 metres and can be climbed via 365 steps, offering views over the city of Fribourg. The main portal of the cathedral is decorated with a bas-relief depicting the Last Judgement.

The stained-glass windows were designed by the Polish painter Józef Mehoffer between 1896 and 1936. They form one of the most important complete ensembles of Art Nouveau church stained glass in Europe. The ensemble was supplemented in 1970 by works by the French painter Alfred Manessier.

The cathedral’s organs combine classical and romantic characteristics and were built by the local organ builder Aloys Moser. His instruments, constructed between 1824 and 1834, gained early recognition and attracted renowned musicians, including Franz Liszt and Anton Bruckner.

With the papal bull Sollicitudo omnium ecclesiarum of 17 October 1924, the collegiate church of St Nicholas was raised to cathedral status, and Fribourg was designated the seat of the Diocese of Lausanne, Geneva and Fribourg. Marius Besson (1876–1945) officially took possession of the cathedral on 1 February 1925 as the first bishop of the diocese.

== Architecture ==
From the beginning of construction in 1283, the south portal served as the cathedral’s main entrance, as the Burgquartier on the opposite side was separated by a ditch. When construction was completed in 1490, the cathedral acquired its present main entrance at the west portal. From the 1970s, the south portal was covered with a wooden structure to protect it from air pollution caused by heavy traffic passing the cathedral. After approval of the Poya Bridge project was approved in 2006, traffic around the cathedral fell and restoration of the south portal became possible. The south portal was fully restored and reopened to the public in 2016.

== Audio ==
Fribourg cathedral strikes 9 o'clock

Full ringing of the Cathedral of St. Nicholas in Freiburg

== Gallery ==
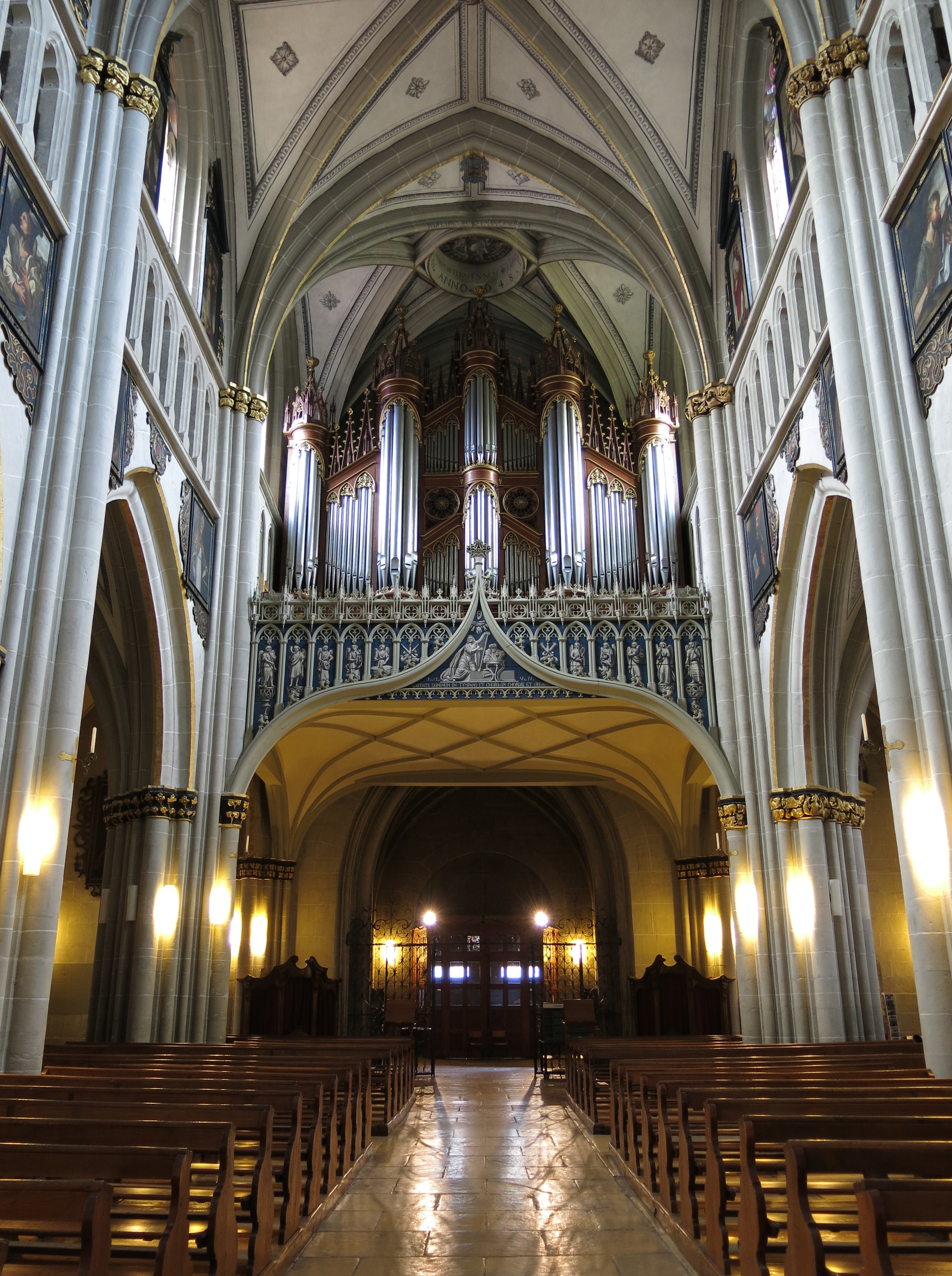
Interior

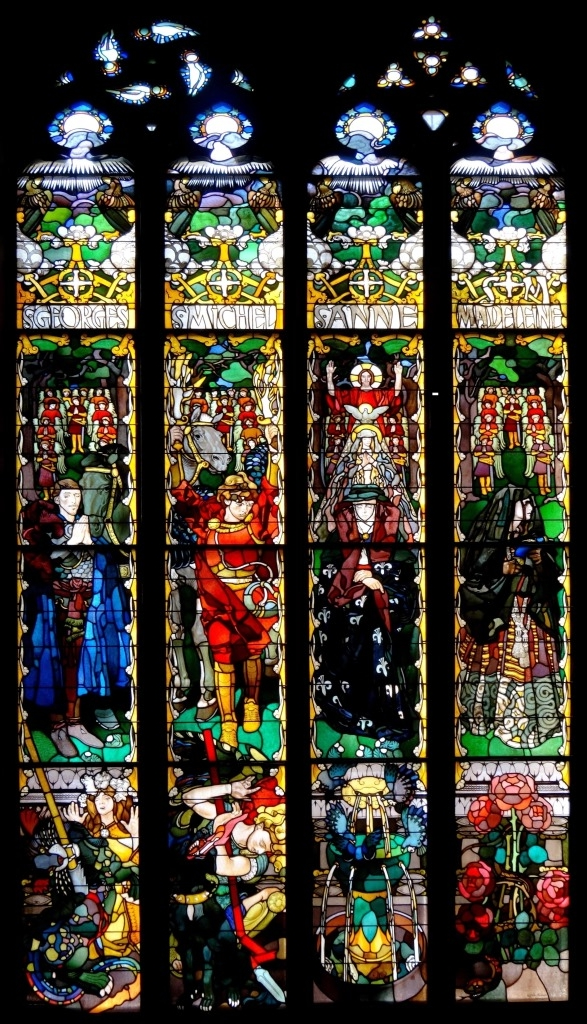
windows of 4 saints

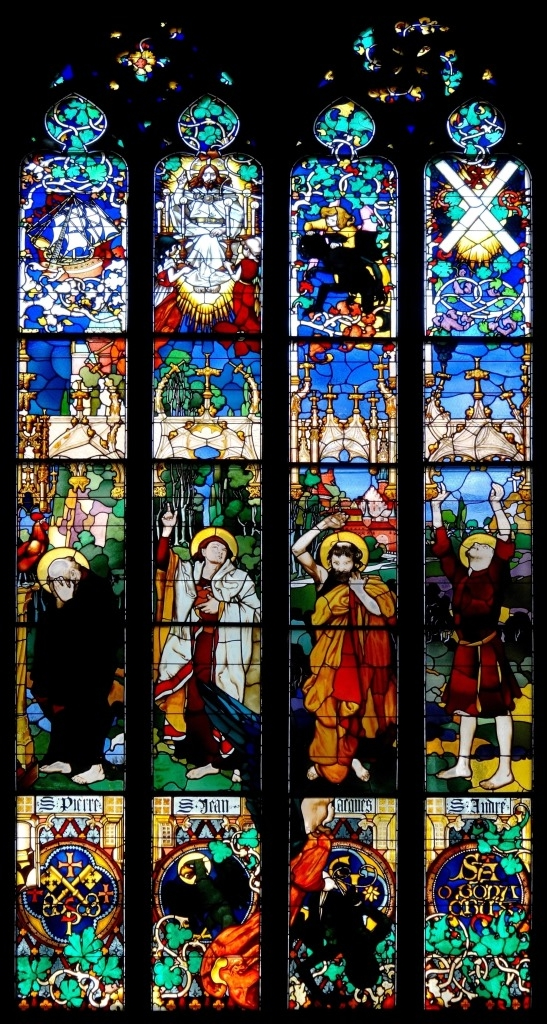
windows of 4 Apostles

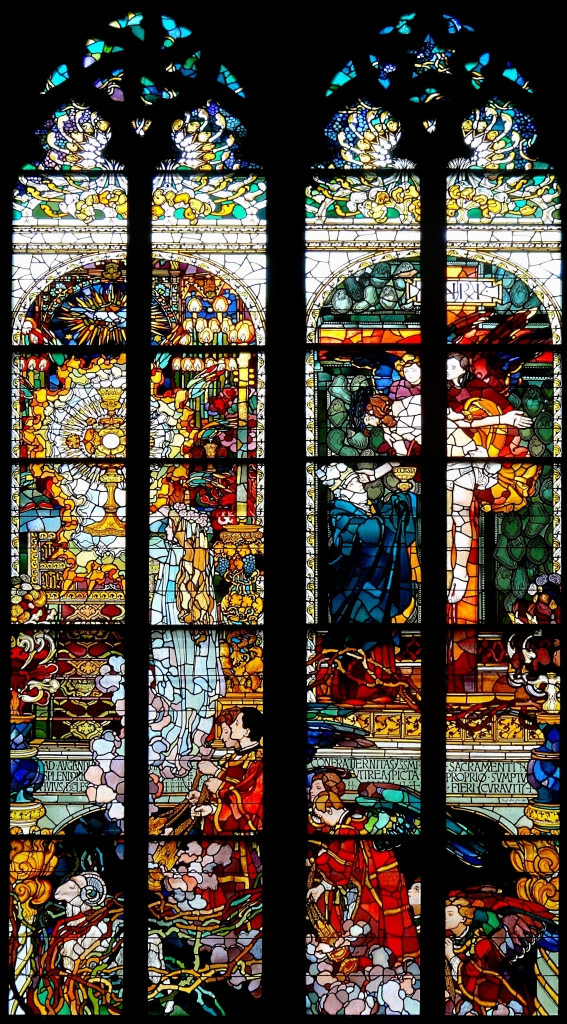
windows of the eucharist

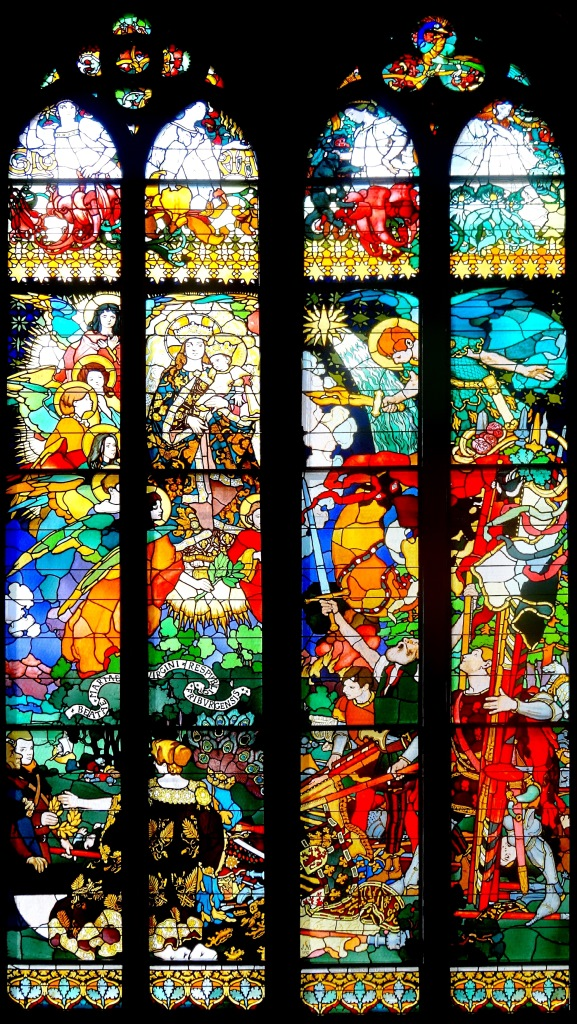
windows of Our Lady of Victory

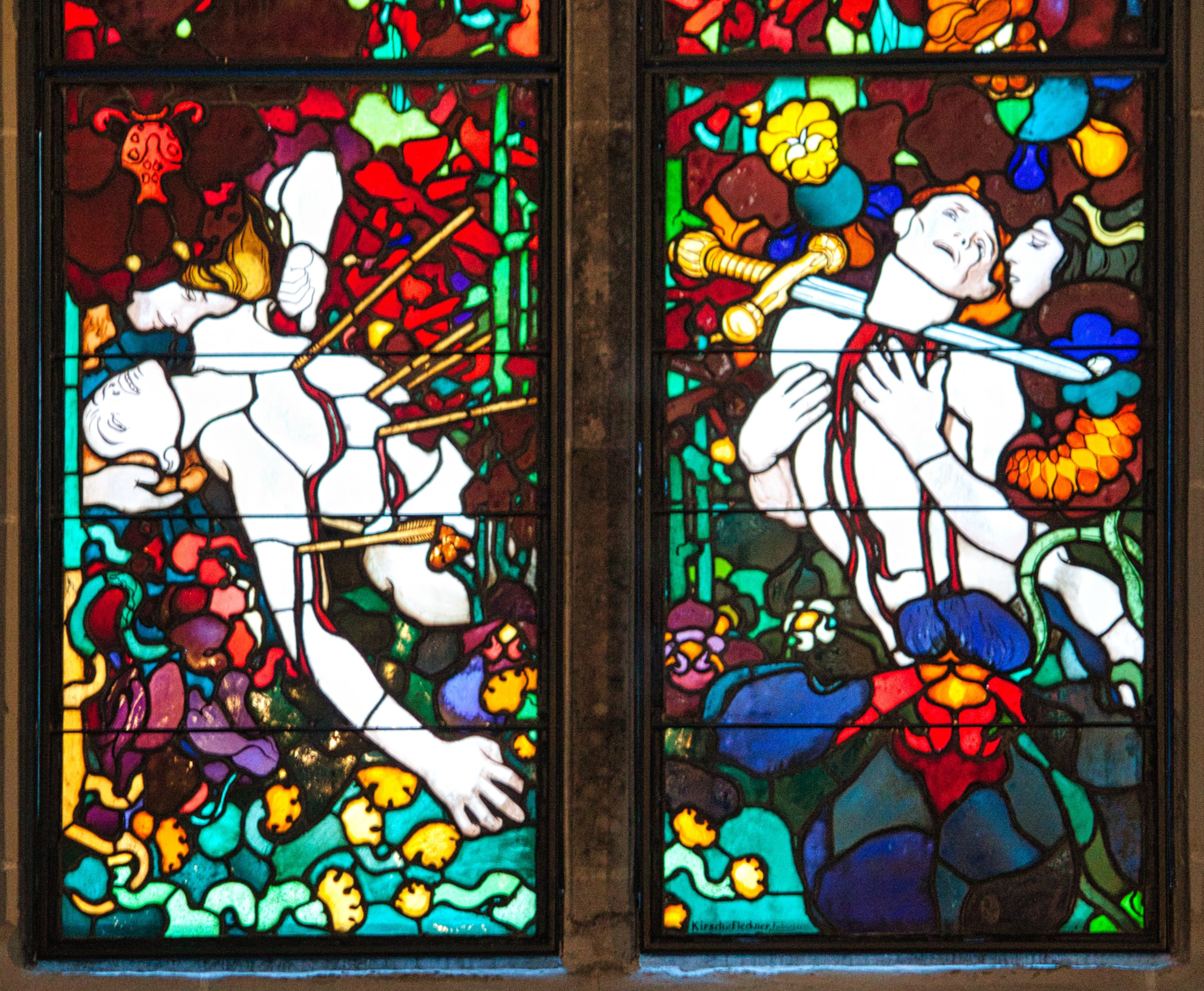
window of martyrs by J. Mehoffer
