= Józef Mehoffer =

Polish painter (1869–1946)

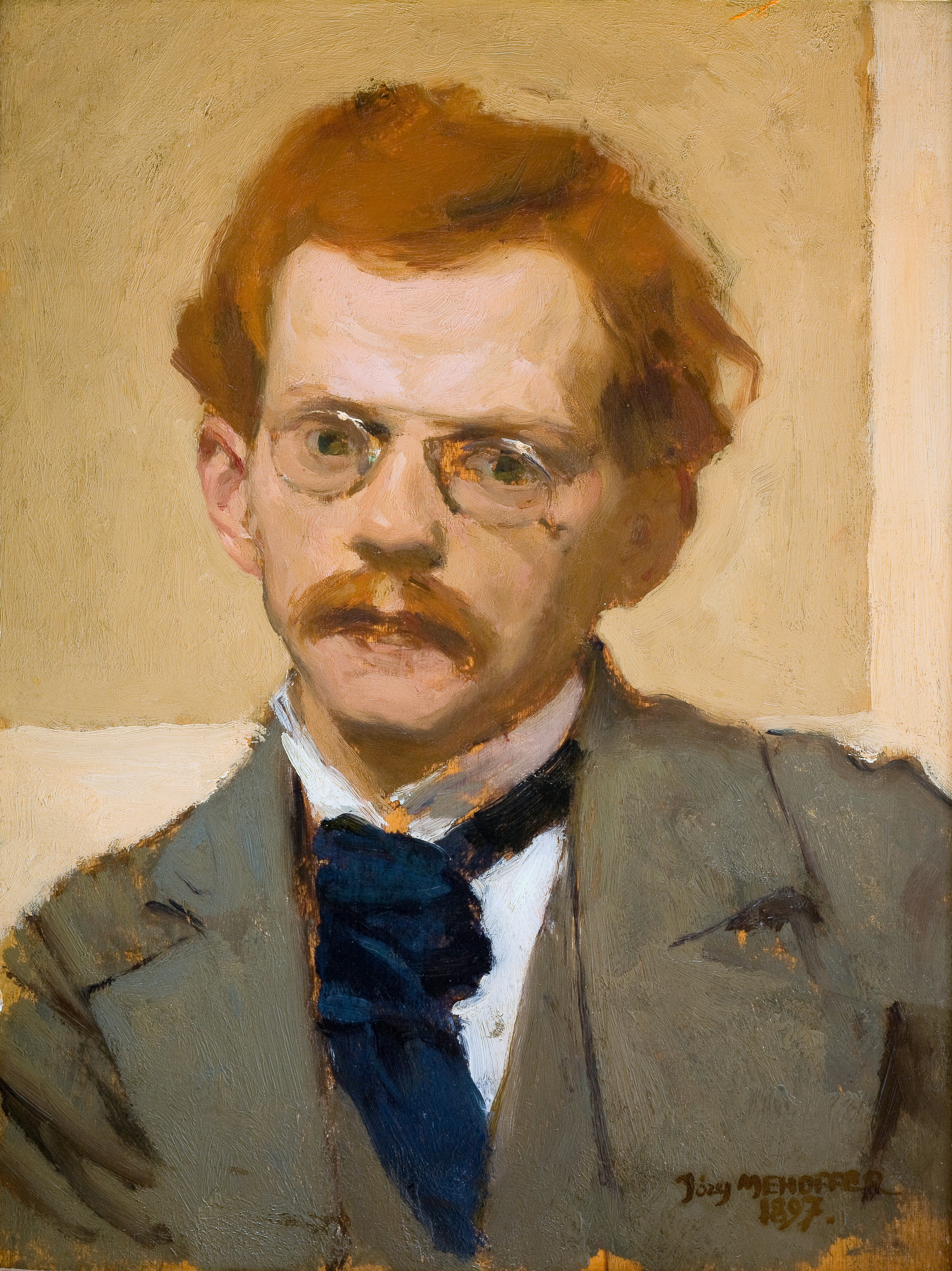
- Self-portrait (1897), National Museum, Kraków
- Born: Józef Edler von Mehoffer; 19 March 1869; Ropczyce, Austro-Hungary
- Died: 8 July 1946 (aged 77); Wadowice, Poland
- Known for: Painting, drawing
- Notable work: Strange Garden (1902-1903), Portrait of Wife (1904)
- Movement: Art Nouveau, Young Poland
- Awards: Order of Polonia Restituta, Wawrzyn Akademicki

Józef Mehoffer (19 March 1869 – 8 July 1946) was a Polish painter and decorative artist, one of the leading artists of the Young Poland movement and one of the most revered Polish artists of his time.

== Life ==
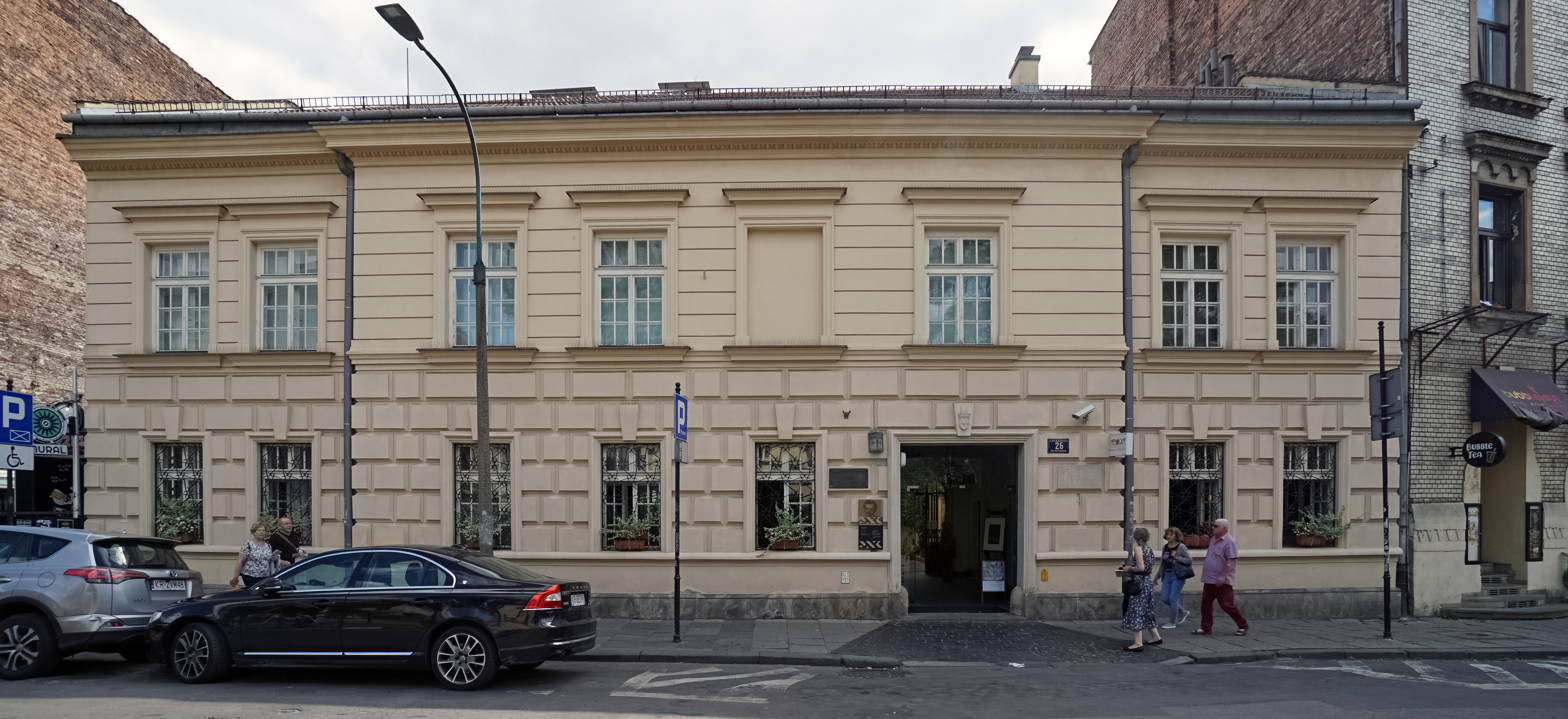
Józef Mehoffer's House 26 Krupnicza Street, Kraków

Mehoffer was born in Ropczyce, studied painting at the Academy of Fine Arts in Kraków under Władysław Łuszczkiewicz, and later at the Academy of Fine Arts in Vienna, as well as in Paris at the Académie Colarossi among others. There Mehoffer began painting portraits, often of people of historical significance. He later expanded his work to include different techniques, such as graphic art, stained glass, textiles, chalk drawings, etchings and book illustrations. He produced set designs for theatre, and stylized furniture designs.

Mehoffer received international acclaim for his stained glass windows in the Gothic St Nicholas Collegiate Church in Fribourg, Switzerland produced in 1895–1936. His other stained glass designs include the Radziwill Chapel in Balice (1892), Grauer Chapel in Opava (1901), church in Jutrosin (1902), Holy Cross Chapel at Wawel (1904), sepulchral chapel in Goluchów (1906), Orgelmeister Chapel in Vienna (1910), cathedral in Włocławek (1935–1940), cathedral in Przemyśl (1940) and church in Dębniki near Kraków (1943). There are stained glass designed by Mehoffer in the Church of the Sacred Heart of Jesus in Turek; in the same church there are also mural paintings made by Mehoffer.

Mehoffer explored various media further throughout his career to include a range of applied arts in his projects. He manufactured a multiplicity of book covers, ornaments and posters. Mehoffer – aside from his versatility in studio art – became known for his frescoes often reminiscent of medieval art. He frequently collaborated with Stanisław Wyspiański and Jan Matejko. He died in Wadowice.

== Marriage and family ==
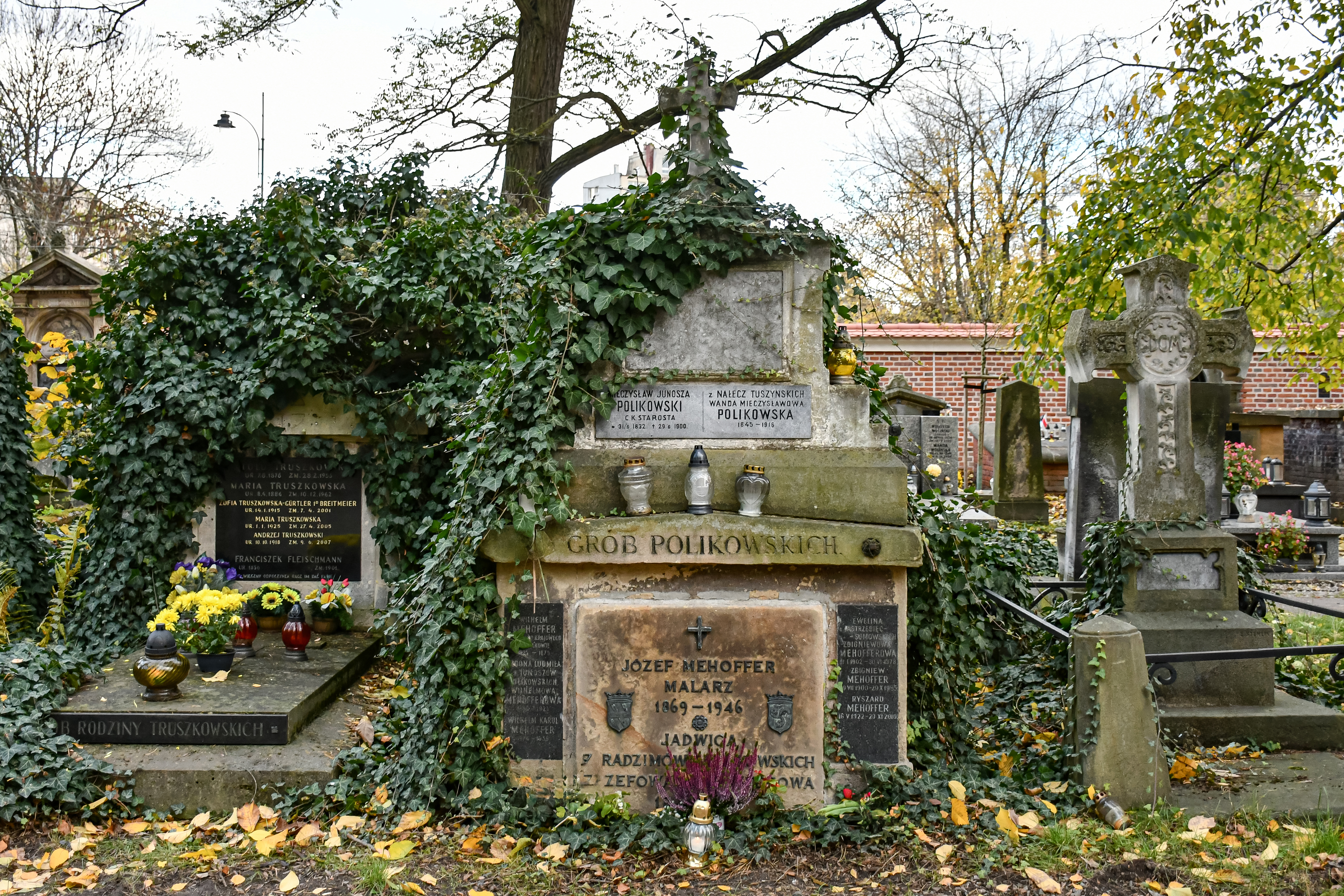
Tomb of Józef Mehoffer Rakowicki Cemetery, 26 Rakowicka Street, Kraków

In September 1899, Mehoffer married Jadwiga Janakowska, whom he had met five years earlier in Paris. They had a son, Zbigniew (1900–1985). Janakowska was the artist's muse and frequently posed for his portrait paintings.

== Gallery ==
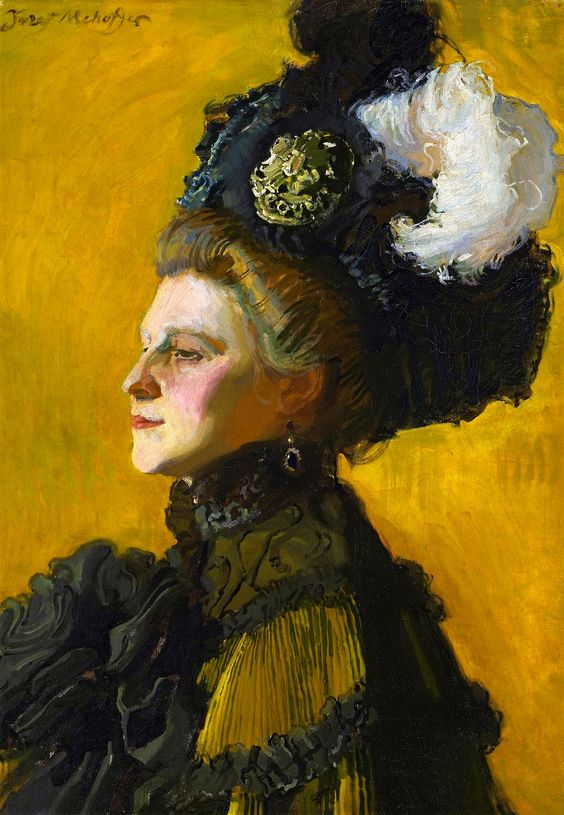
Portrait of the wife

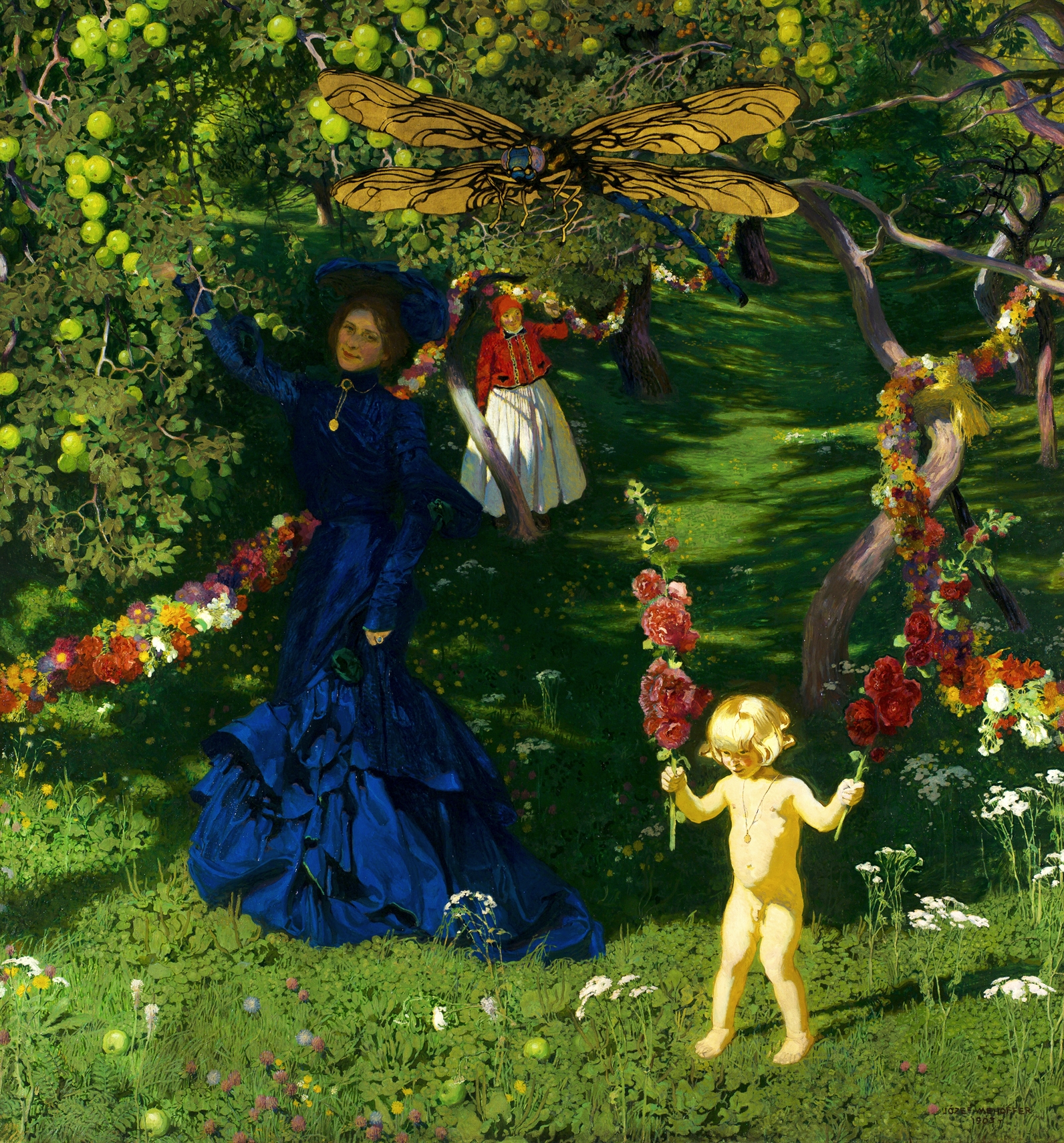
Strange Garden (1902–1903), National Museum in Warsaw

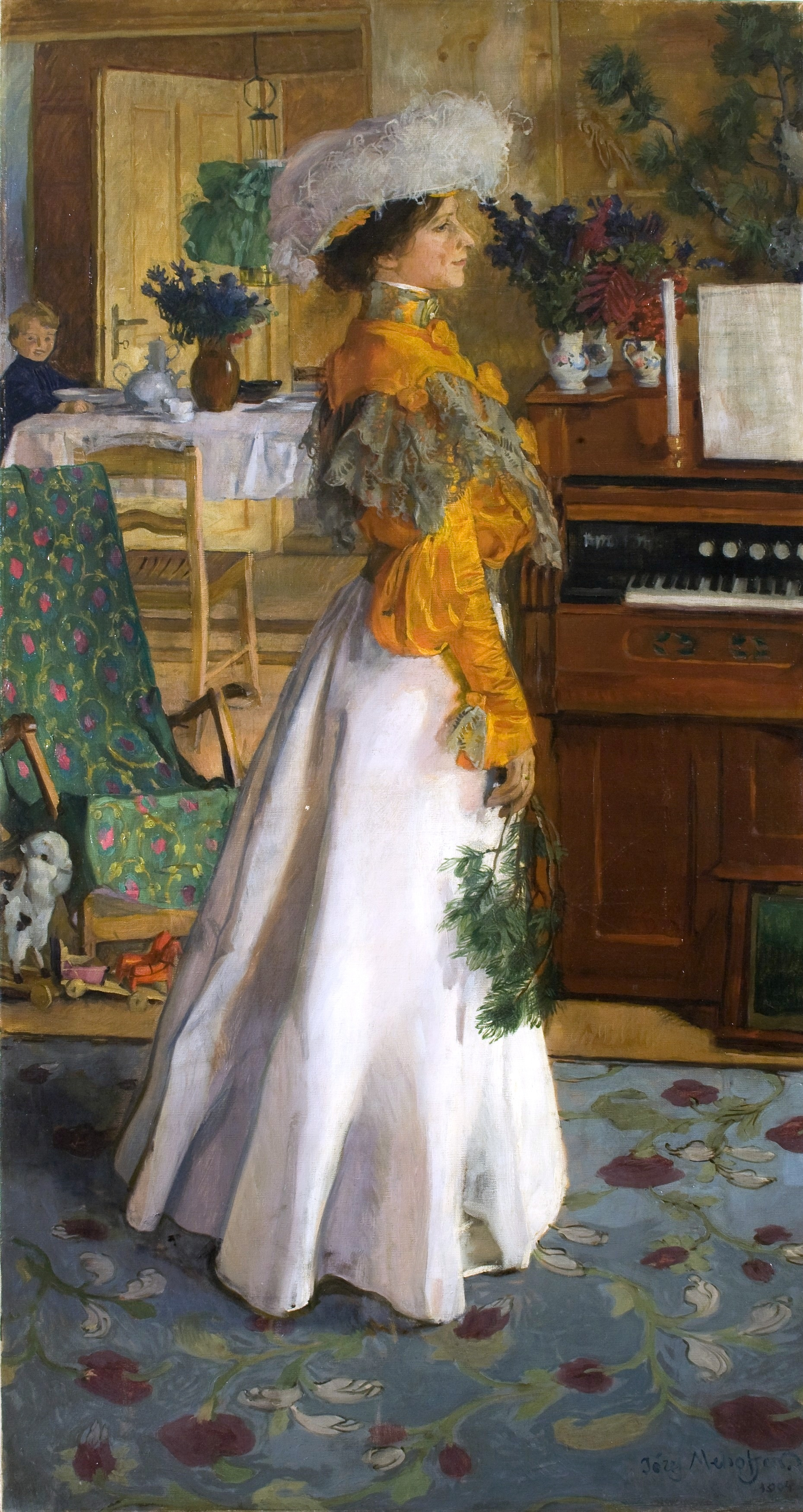
Portrait of Wife (1904), National Museum in Kraków

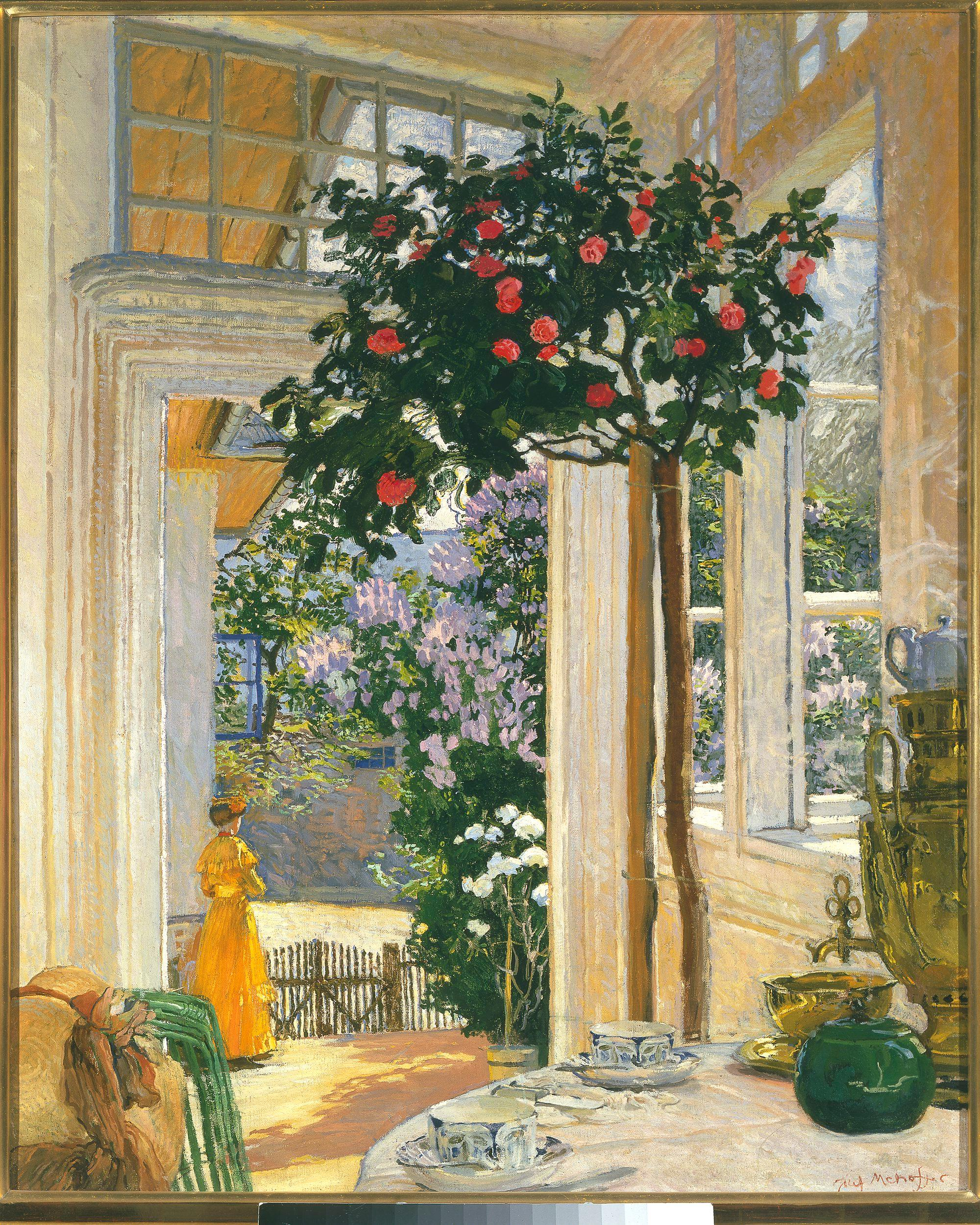
Sun in May (1911)

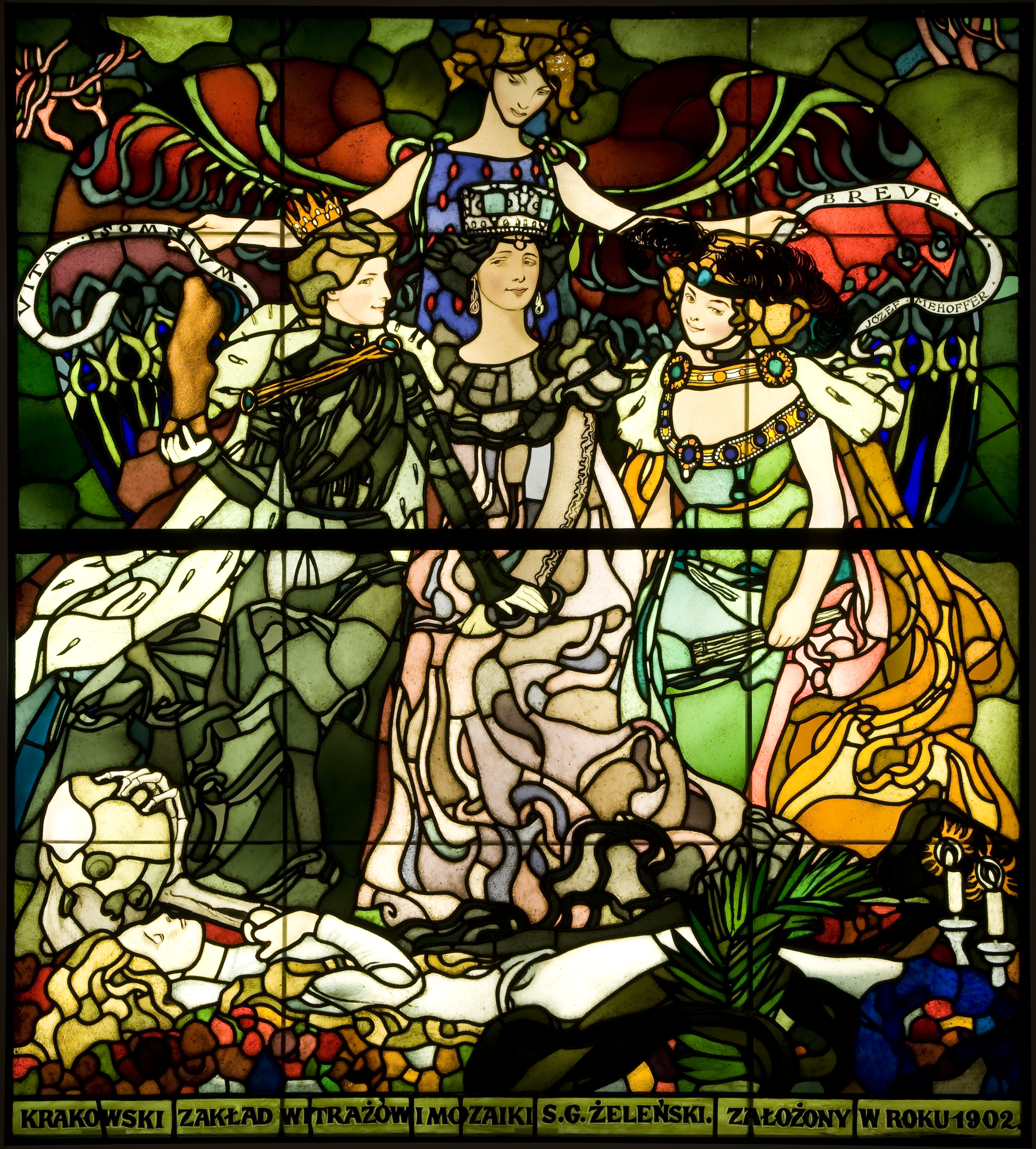
Vita somnium breve, stained-glass, 1895, National Museum in Kraków

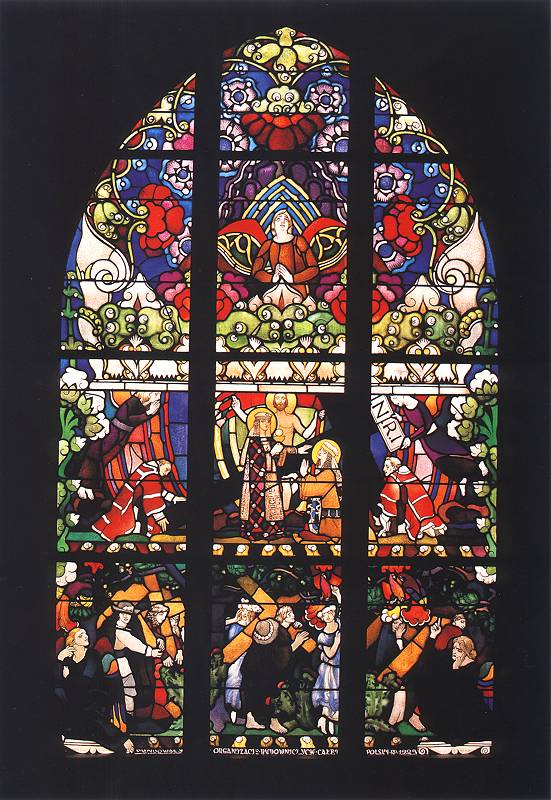
Interior of the Holy Cross Chapel, Wawel

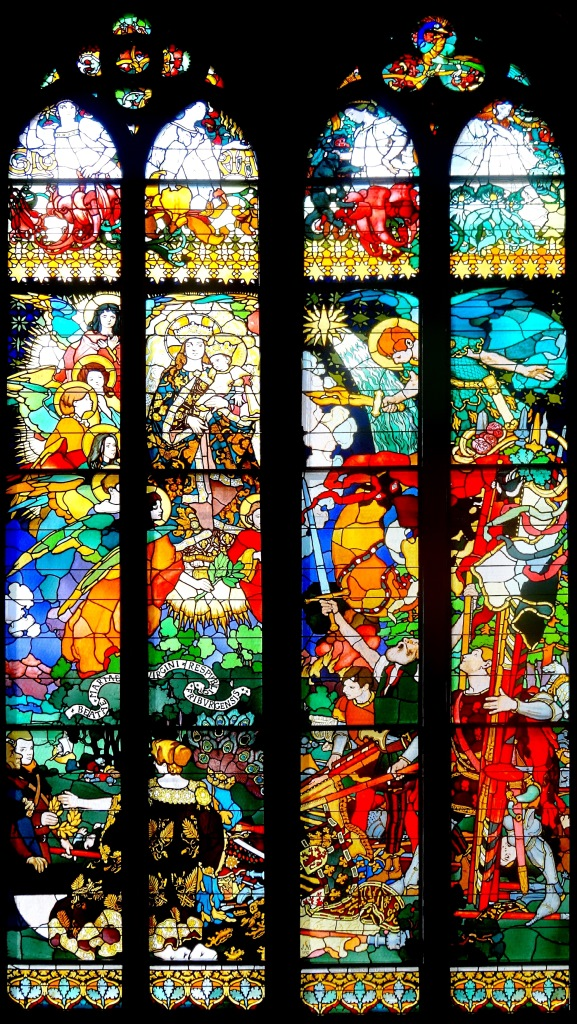
Stained-glass in Fribourg Cathedral

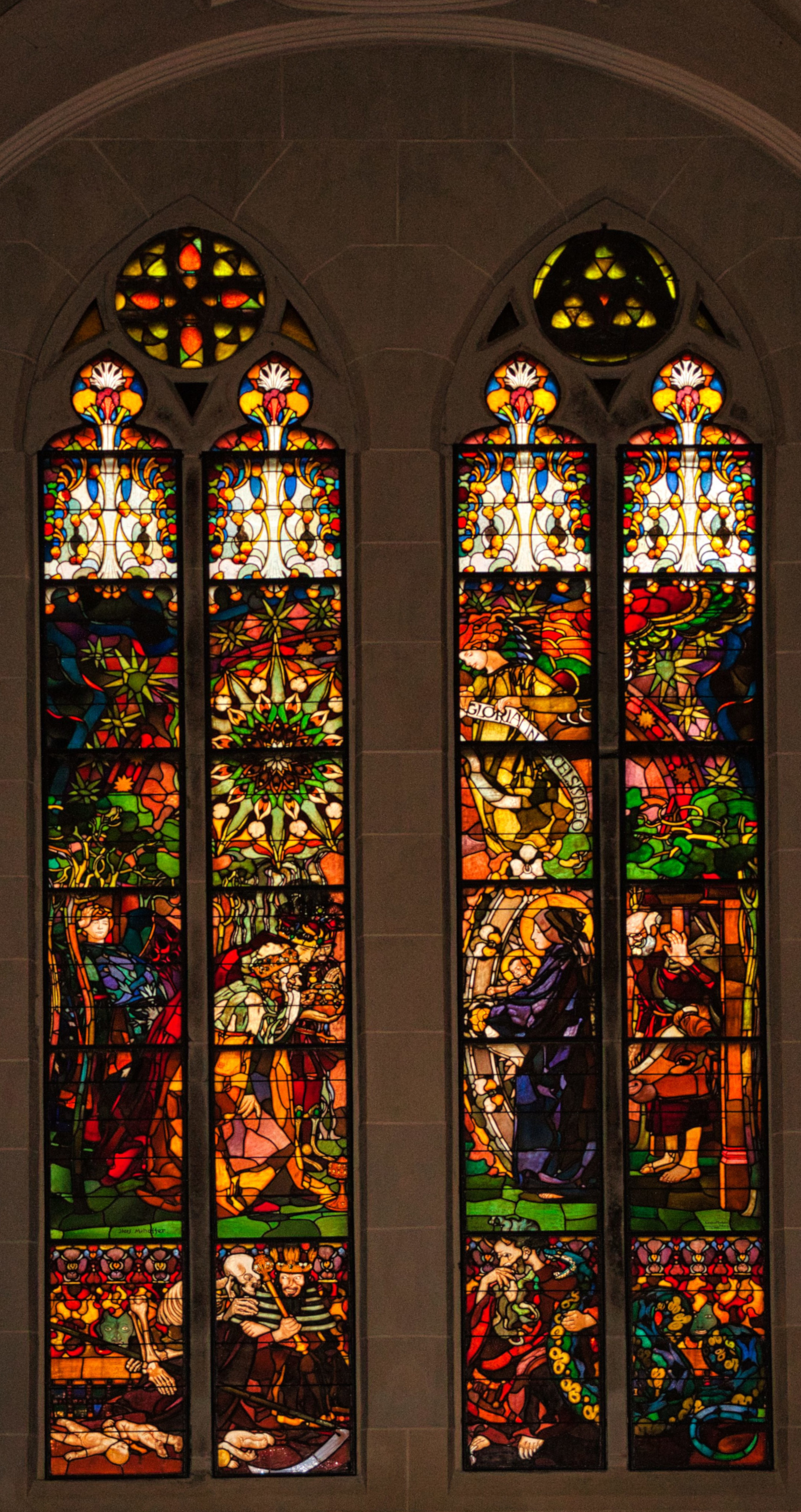
Window of the Three Magi in Fribourg, Switzerland

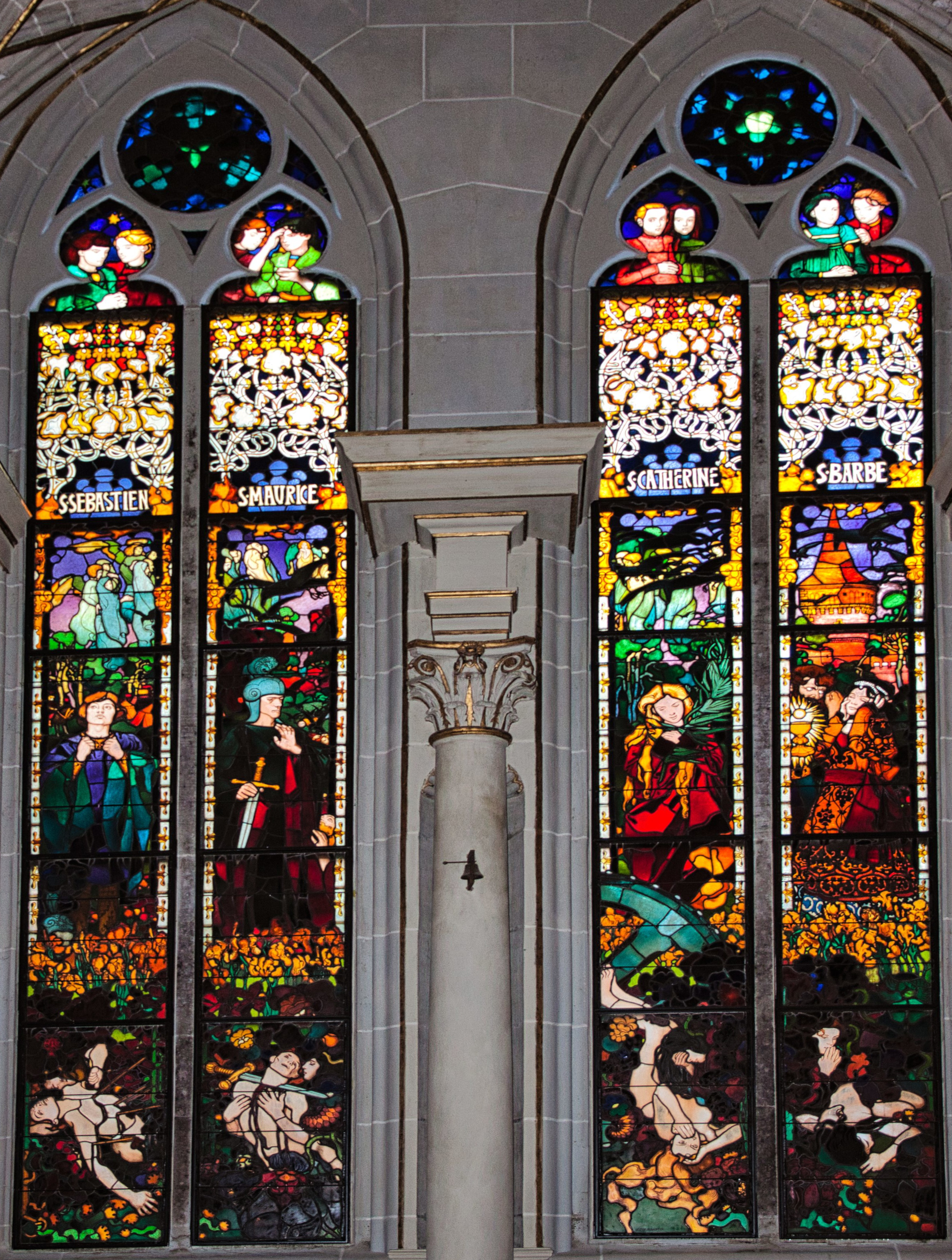
Window of martyrs in Fribourg, Switzerland

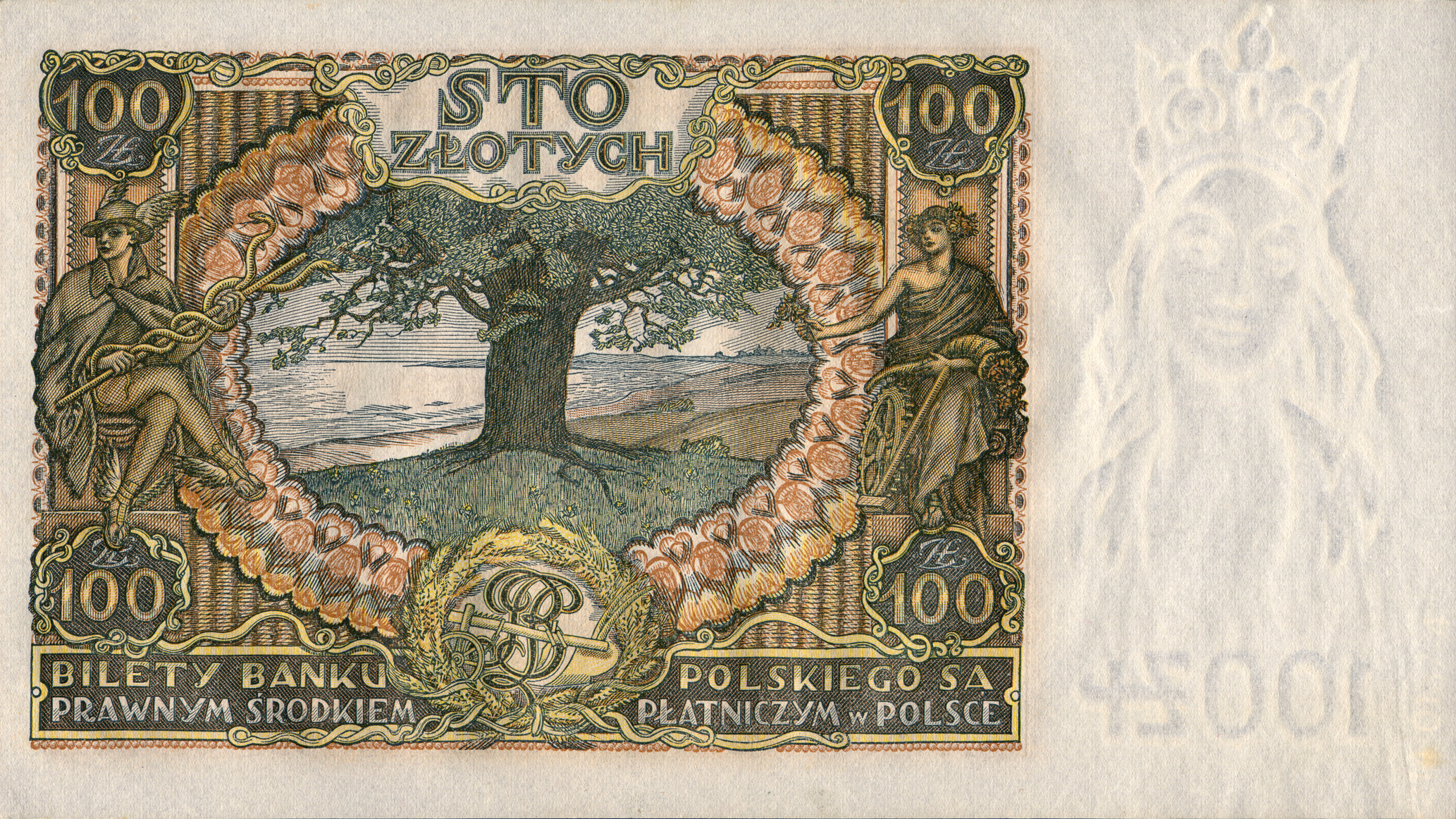
100 złotych, 1934, issued by the Bank of Poland

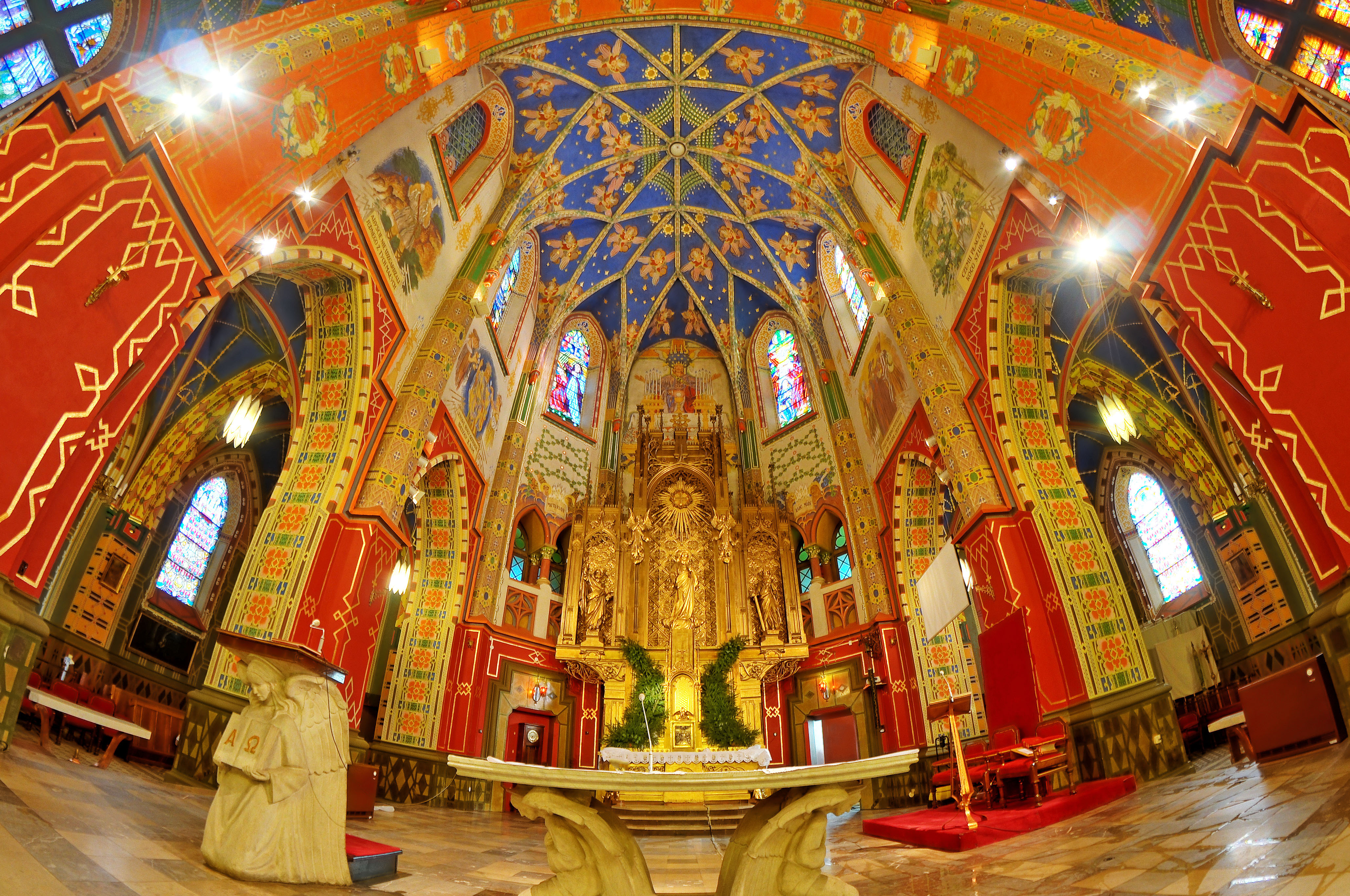
Cathedral in Turek

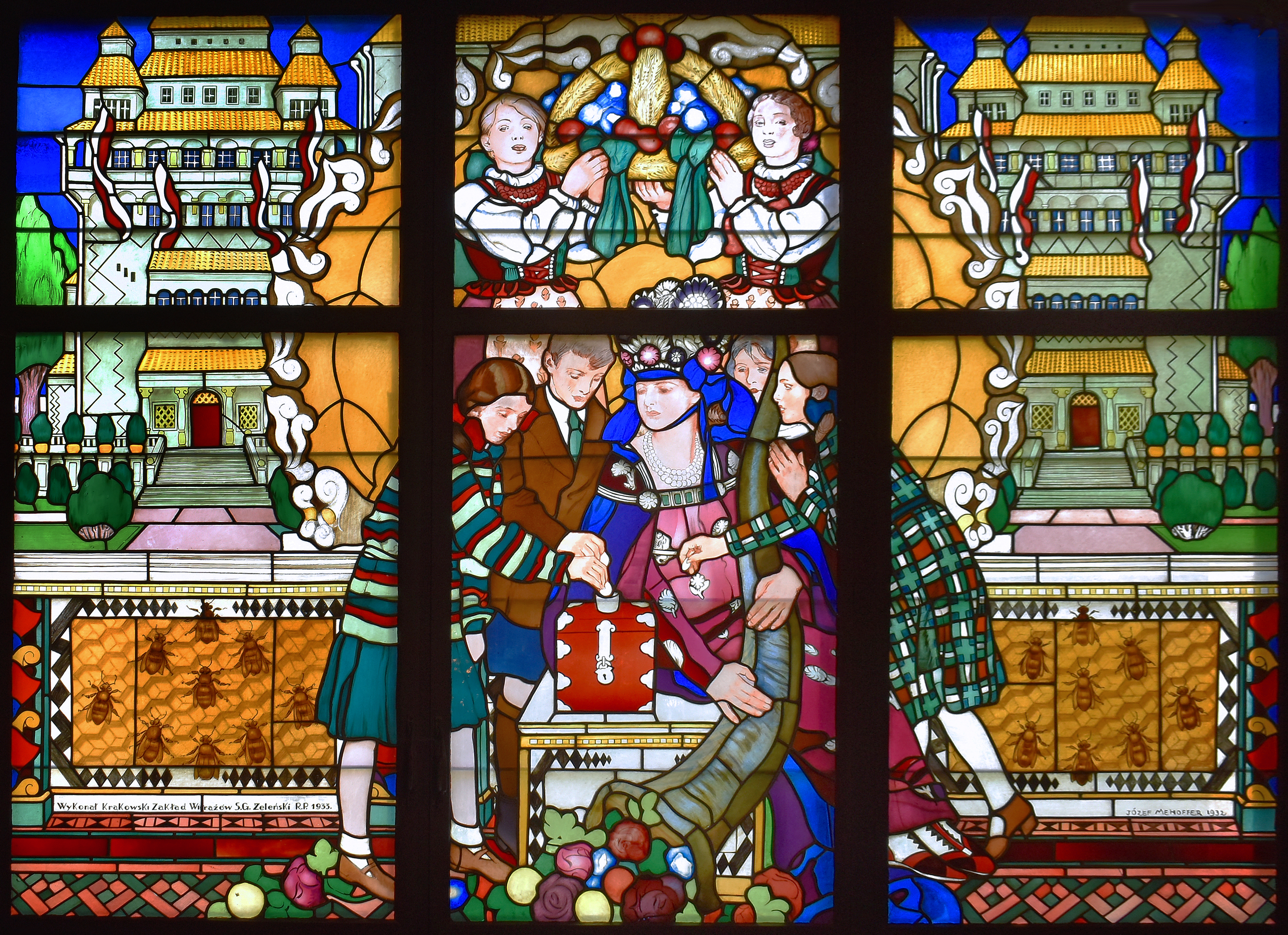
Stained glass window "Allegory of Saving",
former KOMK Bank 15 Szpitalna Street, Kraków

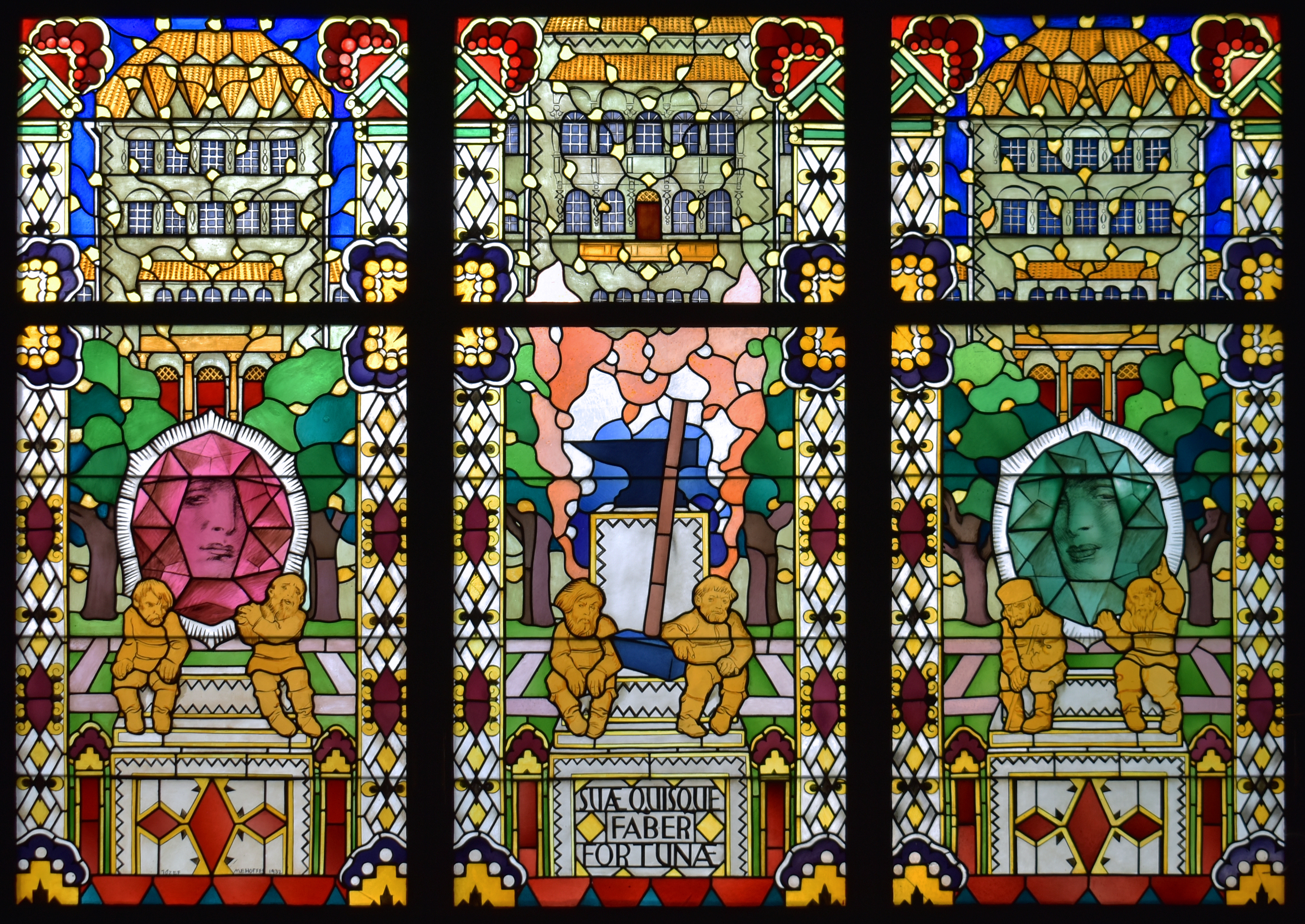
Stained glass window "Allegory of Prosperity",
former KOMK Bank 15 Szpitalna Street, Kraków

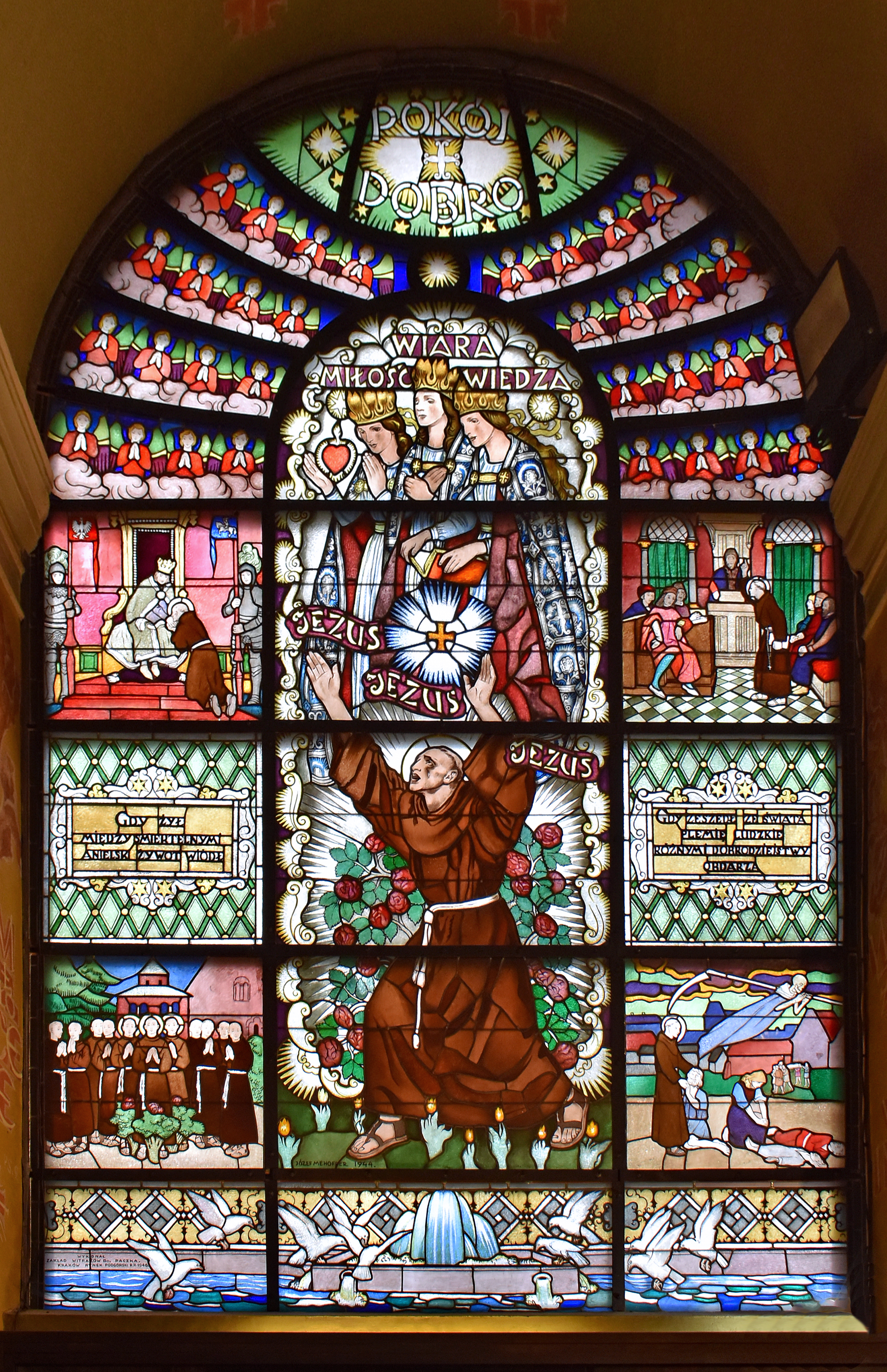
Stained glass window
Church of St. Bernardine of Siena,
2 Bernardyńska Street, Kraków

== See also ==
- Culture of Kraków
- List of Polish people
